= Sadowie =

Sadowie may refer to the following places:

- Sadowie, Greater Poland Voivodeship (west-central Poland)
- Sadowie, Lesser Poland Voivodeship (south Poland)
- Sadowie, Świętokrzyskie Voivodeship (south-central Poland)
- Sadowie, Będzin County in Silesian Voivodeship (south Poland)
- Sadowie, Zawiercie County in Silesian Voivodeship (south Poland)
