= Hucisko, Zawiercie County =

Hucisko
- Village
- Location within Poland
- Coordinates: 50°35′14″N 19°30′17″E
- Country: Poland
- Voivodeship: Silesian
- County: Zawiercie
- Gmina: Włodowice

Hucisko [xuˈt͡ɕiskɔ] is a village in the administrative district of Gmina Włodowice, within Zawiercie County, Silesian Voivodeship, in southern Poland.
