= Złożeniec =

- Village
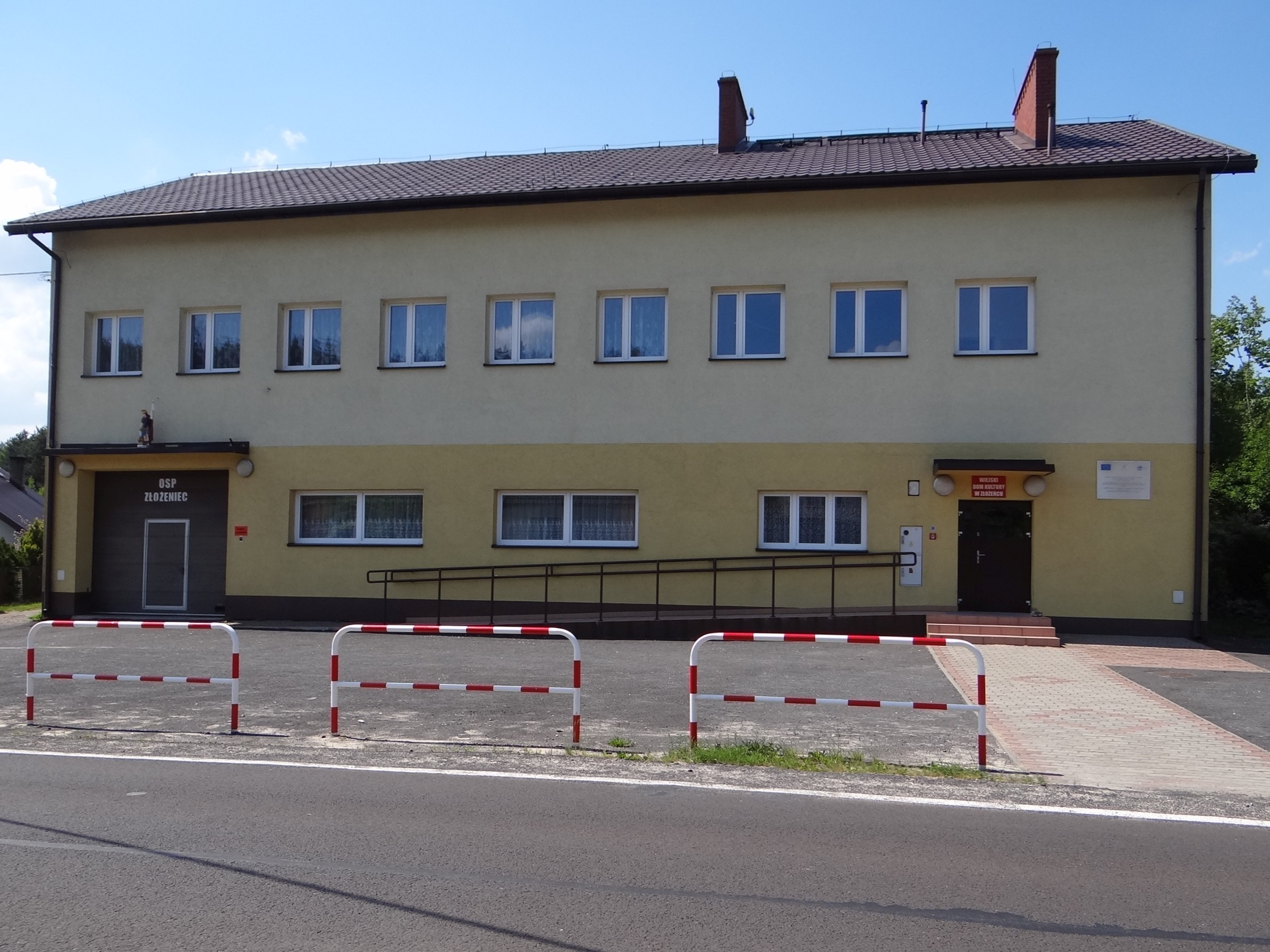
- Fire station

- Location within Poland
- Coordinates: 50°26′N 19°39′E
- Country: Poland
- Voivodeship: Silesian
- County: Zawiercie
- Gmina: Pilica
- Population: 440

Złożeniec [zwɔˈʐɛɲɛt͡s] is a village in the administrative district of Gmina Pilica, within Zawiercie County, Silesian Voivodeship, in southern Poland.
