= Żelazko, Silesian Voivodeship =

Żelazko
- Village
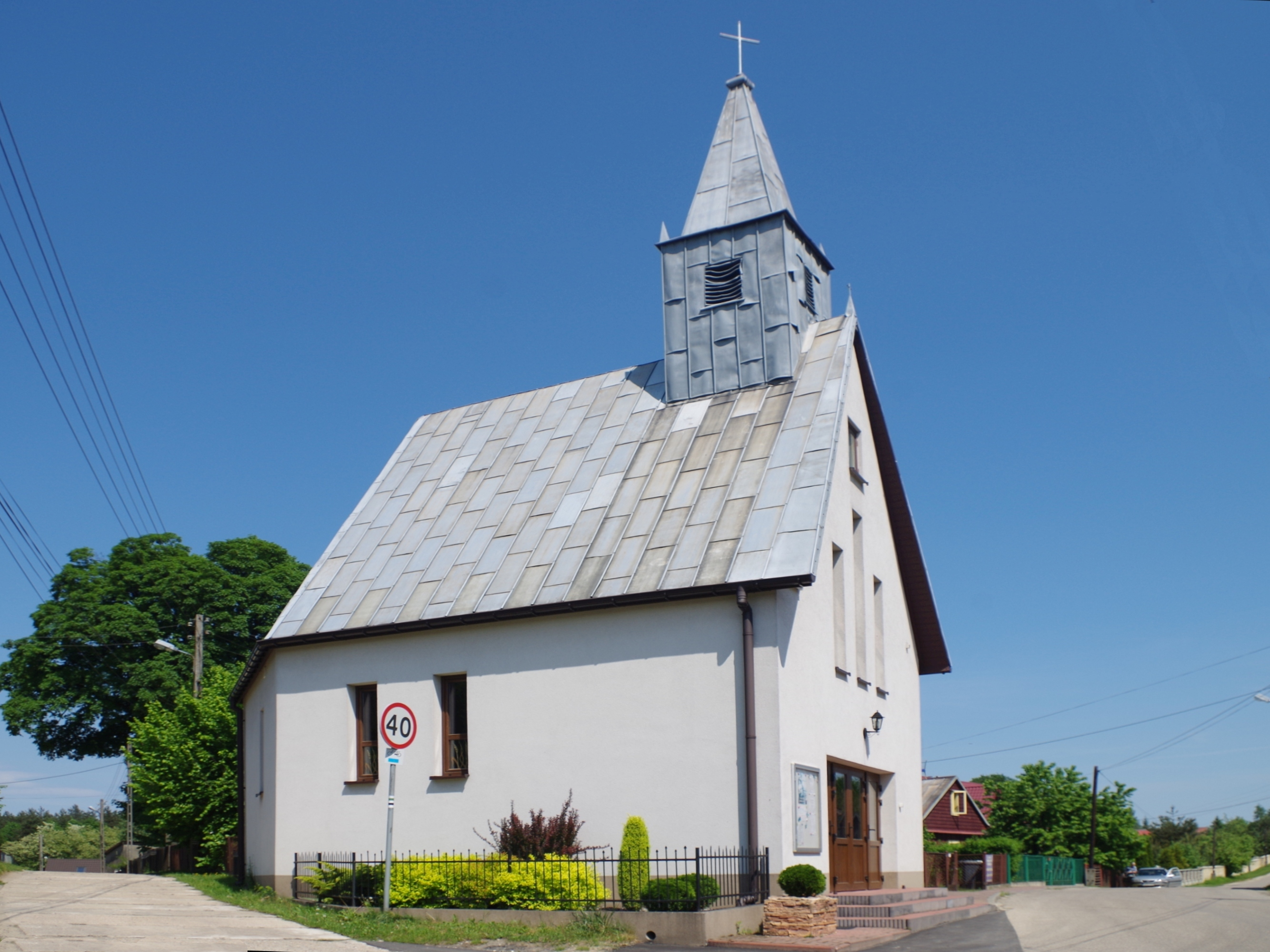
- Chapel in Żelazko

- Location within Poland
- Coordinates: 50°24′N 19°33′E
- Country: Poland
- Voivodeship: Silesian
- County: Zawiercie
- Gmina: Ogrodzieniec

Żelazko [ʐɛˈlaskɔ] is a village in the administrative district of Gmina Ogrodzieniec, within Zawiercie County, Silesian Voivodeship, in southern Poland.
