= Śrubarnia =

- Village
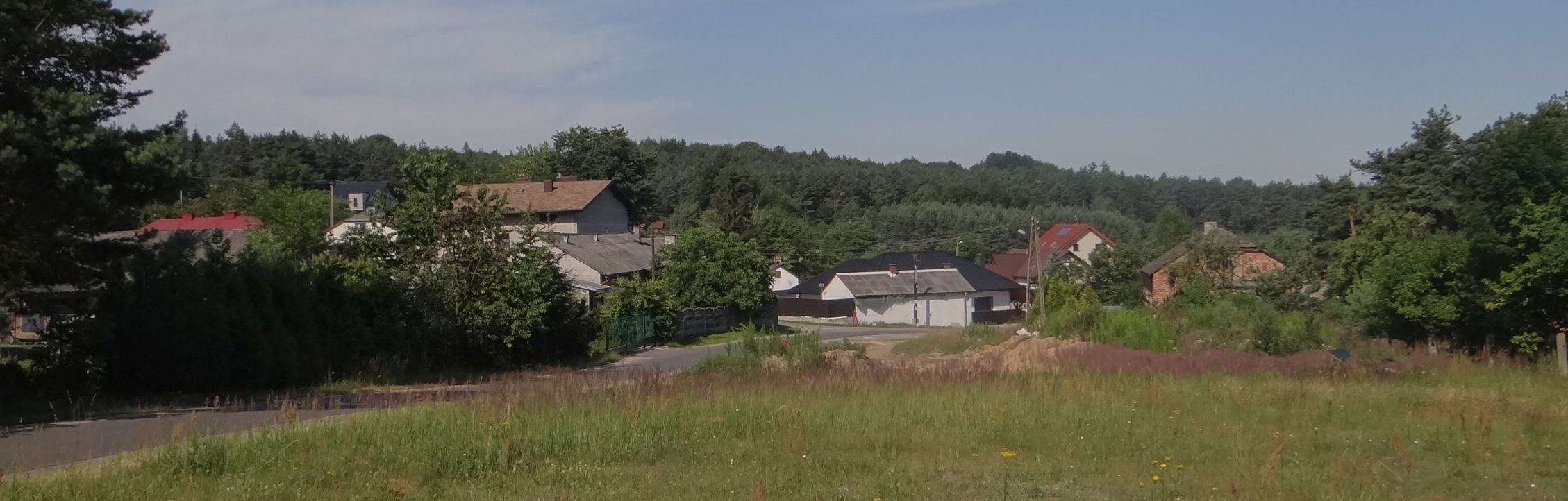

- Location within Poland
- Coordinates: 50°25′10″N 19°32′53″E
- Country: Poland
- Voivodeship: Silesian
- County: Zawiercie
- Gmina: Ogrodzieniec

Śrubarnia [ɕruˈbarɲa] is a village in the administrative district of Gmina Ogrodzieniec, within Zawiercie County, Silesian Voivodeship, in southern Poland.
