= Mokrus, Silesian Voivodeship =

Mokrus
- Village
- Location within Poland
- Coordinates: 50°29′49″N 19°36′11″E
- Country: Poland
- Voivodeship: Silesian
- County: Zawiercie
- Gmina: Ogrodzieniec

Mokrus [ˈmɔkrus] is a village in the administrative district of Gmina Ogrodzieniec, within Zawiercie County, Silesian Voivodeship, in southern Poland.
