= Podleśna, Silesian Voivodeship =

Podleśna
- Village
- Location within Poland
- Coordinates: 50°31′22″N 19°46′1″E
- Country: Poland
- Voivodeship: Silesian
- County: Zawiercie
- Gmina: Pilica
- Population (approx.): 70

Podleśna [pɔdˈlɛɕna] is a village in the administrative district of Gmina Pilica, within Zawiercie County, Silesian Voivodeship, in southern Poland.
