= Kiełkowice =

- Village
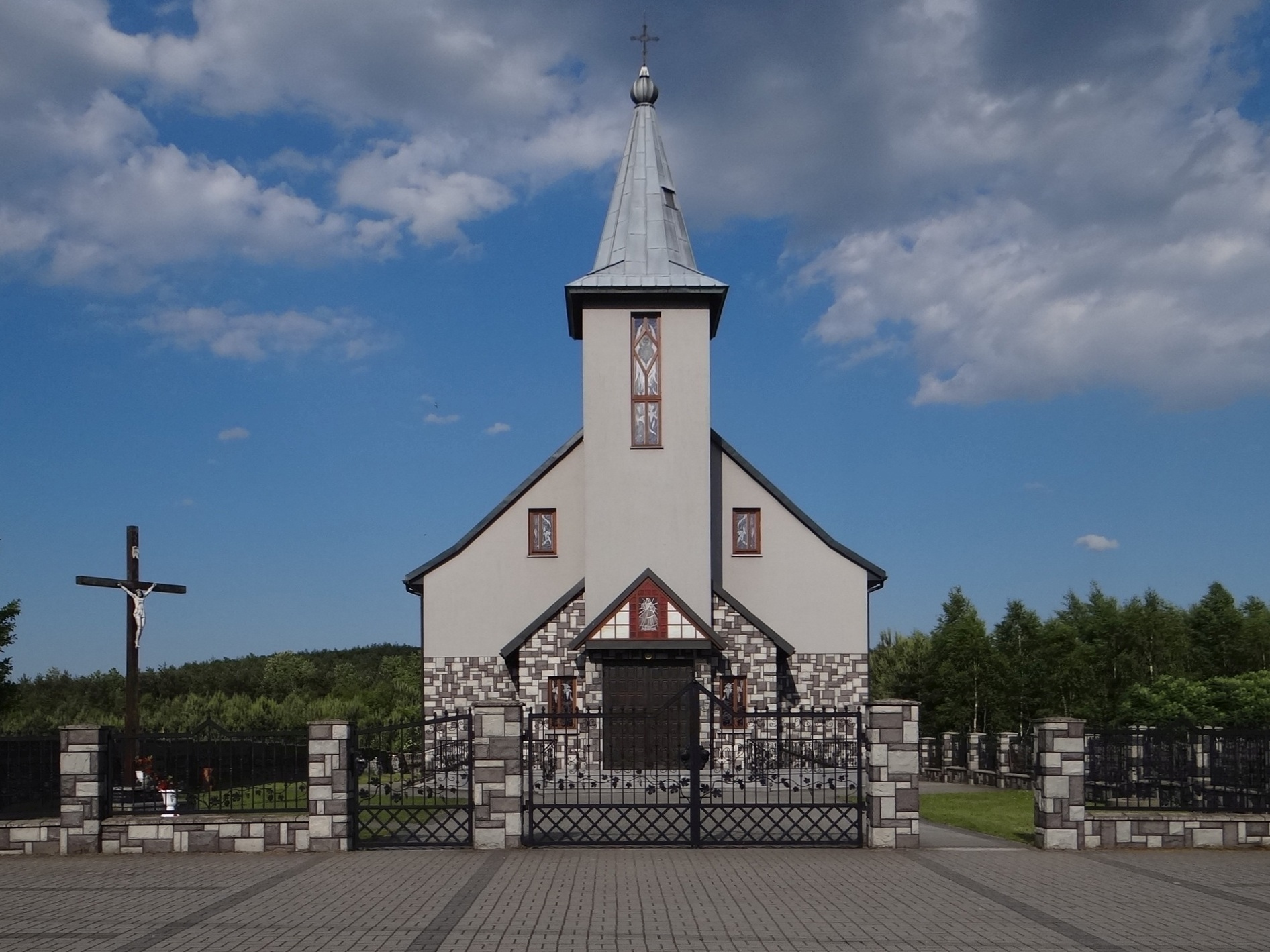
- Catholic church

- Location within Poland
- Coordinates: 50°29′9″N 19°34′23″E
- Country: Poland
- Voivodeship: Silesian
- County: Zawiercie
- Gmina: Ogrodzieniec

Kiełkowice [kʲɛu̯kɔˈvit͡sɛ] is a village in the administrative district of Gmina Ogrodzieniec, within Zawiercie County, Silesian Voivodeship, in southern Poland.
