= Siedliszowice, Silesian Voivodeship =

Siedliszowice
- Village
- Location within Poland
- Coordinates: 50°33′N 19°40′E
- Country: Poland
- Voivodeship: Silesian
- County: Zawiercie
- Gmina: Kroczyce
- Elevation: 250 m (820 ft)
- Population: 200

Siedliszowice [ɕɛdliʂɔˈvit͡sɛ] is a village in the administrative district of Gmina Kroczyce, within Zawiercie County, Silesian Voivodeship, in southern Poland.
