= Wilków, Silesian Voivodeship =

Wilków
- Village
- Location within Poland
- Coordinates: 50°36′36″N 19°39′16″E
- Country: Poland
- Voivodeship: Silesian
- County: Zawiercie
- Gmina: Irządze
- Population: 280

Wilków [ˈvilkuf] is a village in the administrative district of Gmina Irządze, within Zawiercie County, Silesian Voivodeship, in southern Poland.
