= Rzędkowice, Silesian Voivodeship =

Rzędkowice
- Village
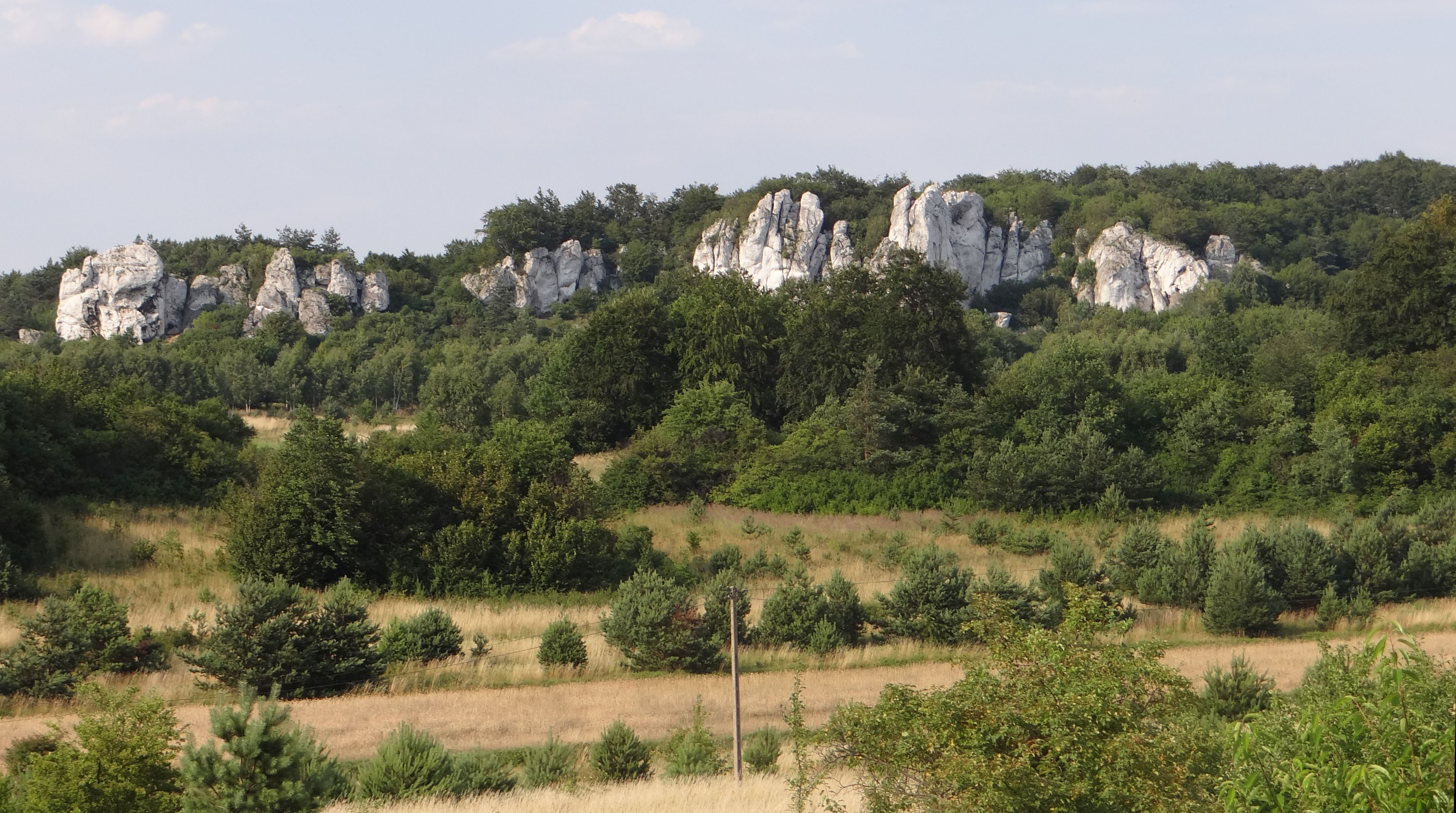
- Rzędkowice limestone rocks

- Location within Poland
- Coordinates: 50°35′N 19°29′E
- Country: Poland
- Voivodeship: Silesian
- County: Zawiercie
- Gmina: Włodowice

Rzędkowice [ʐɛntkɔˈvit͡sɛ] is a village in the administrative district of Gmina Włodowice, within Zawiercie County, Silesian Voivodeship, in southern Poland.

The village is a popular destination for rock climbing; approximately 25 named limestone crags host approximately 470 routes in the region. Most rocks are south-facing; the area predominately facilitates sport climbing, but trad climbing and bouldering can also be found. The hardest route in this region is the sport climb Moce Piekielne (in English: Hellish Powers), graded VI.6+, first ascended by Łukasz Dudek in 2016.
