= Siadcza, Silesian Voivodeship =

Siadcza
- Village
- Location within Poland
- Coordinates: 50°31′3″N 19°42′44″E
- Country: Poland
- Voivodeship: Silesian
- County: Zawiercie
- Gmina: Pilica

Siadcza [ˈɕatt͡ʂa] is a village in the administrative district of Gmina Pilica, within Zawiercie County, Silesian Voivodeship, in southern Poland.
