= Skałka, Silesian Voivodeship =

Skałka
- Village
- Location within Poland
- Coordinates: 50°31′48″N 19°24′1″E
- Country: Poland
- Voivodeship: Silesian
- County: Zawiercie
- Gmina: Włodowice

Skałka [ˈskau̯ka] is a village in the administrative district of Gmina Włodowice, within Zawiercie County, Silesian Voivodeship, in southern Poland.
