= Dobra-Kolonia =

- Village
- Location within Poland
- Coordinates: 50°28′24″N 19°41′20″E
- Country: Poland
- Voivodeship: Silesian
- County: Zawiercie
- Gmina: Pilica

Dobra-Kolonia [ˈdɔbra kɔˈlɔɲa] is a village in the administrative district of Gmina Pilica, within Zawiercie County, Silesian Voivodeship, in southern Poland.
