= Wierzbica, Silesian Voivodeship =

Wierzbica
- Village
- Location within Poland
- Coordinates: 50°29′6″N 19°46′0″E
- Country: Poland
- Voivodeship: Silesian
- County: Zawiercie
- Gmina: Pilica
- Population: 368

Wierzbica [vjɛʐˈbit͡sa] is a village in the administrative district of Gmina Pilica, within Zawiercie County, Silesian Voivodeship, in southern Poland.
