= Kopaniny, Zawiercie County =

Kopaniny
- Village
- Location within Poland
- Coordinates: 50°32′17″N 19°24′49″E
- Country: Poland
- Voivodeship: Silesian
- County: Zawiercie
- Gmina: Włodowice

Kopaniny [kɔpaˈninɨ] is a village in the administrative district of Gmina Włodowice, within Zawiercie County, Silesian Voivodeship, in southern Poland.
