= Gulzów =

- Village
- Location within Poland
- Coordinates: 50°28′50″N 19°36′15″E
- Country: Poland
- Voivodeship: Silesian
- County: Zawiercie
- Gmina: Ogrodzieniec
- Population: 320

Gulzów [ˈɡulzuf] is a village in the administrative district of Gmina Ogrodzieniec, within Zawiercie County, Silesian Voivodeship, in southern Poland.
