= Dobraków =

- Village
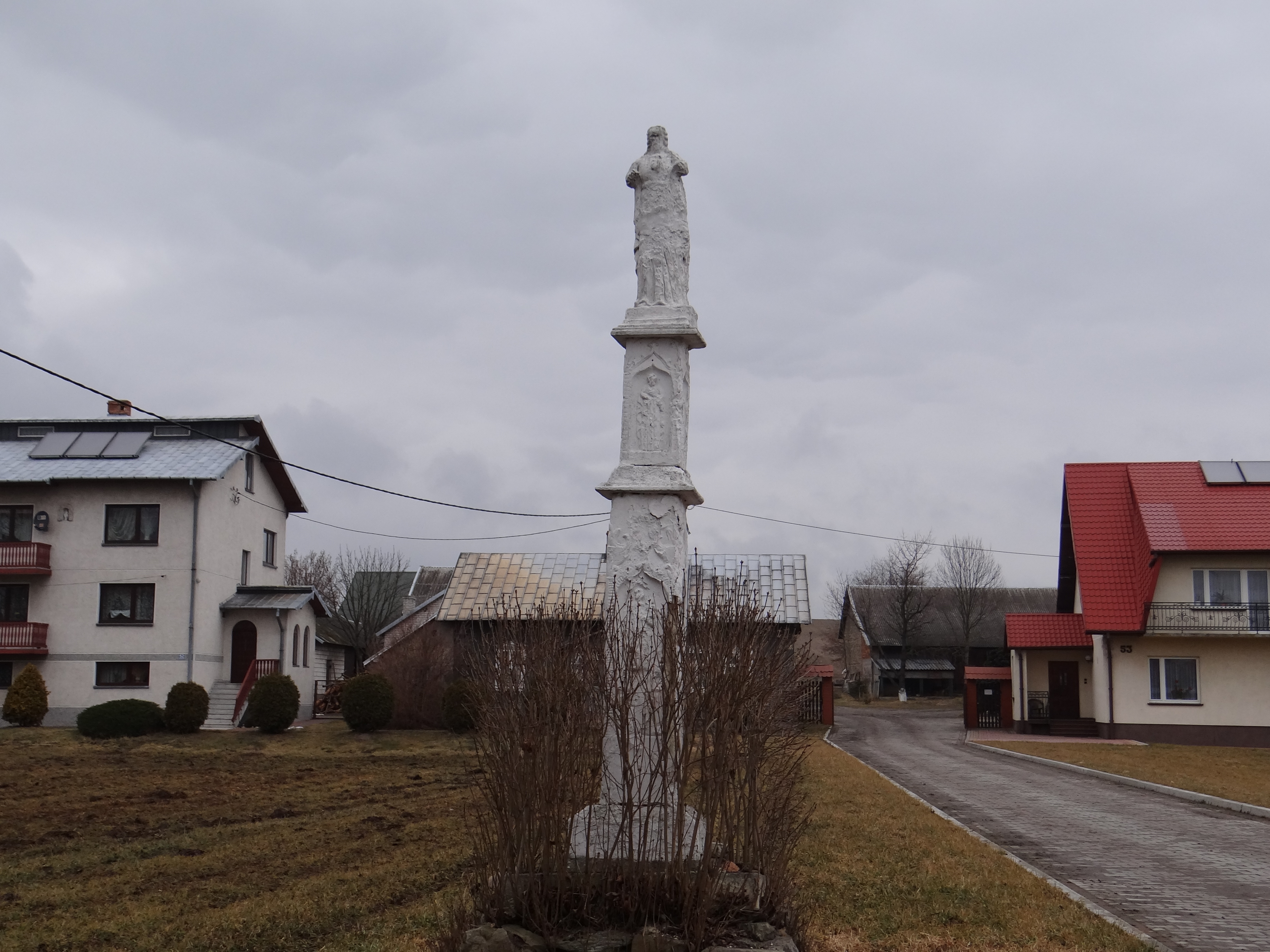

- Location within Poland
- Coordinates: 50°31′N 19°46′E
- Country: Poland
- Voivodeship: Silesian
- County: Zawiercie
- Gmina: Pilica

Dobraków [dɔˈbrakuf] is a village in the administrative district of Gmina Pilica, within Zawiercie County, Silesian Voivodeship, in southern Poland.
