= Kroczyce Stare =

- Village
- Location within Poland
- Coordinates: 50°34′N 19°35′E
- Country: Poland
- Voivodeship: Silesian
- County: Zawiercie
- Gmina: Kroczyce

Kroczyce Stare [krɔˈt͡ʂɨt͡sɛ ˈstarɛ] is a village in the administrative district of Gmina Kroczyce, within Zawiercie County, Silesian Voivodeship, in southern Poland.
