= Zdów =

- Village
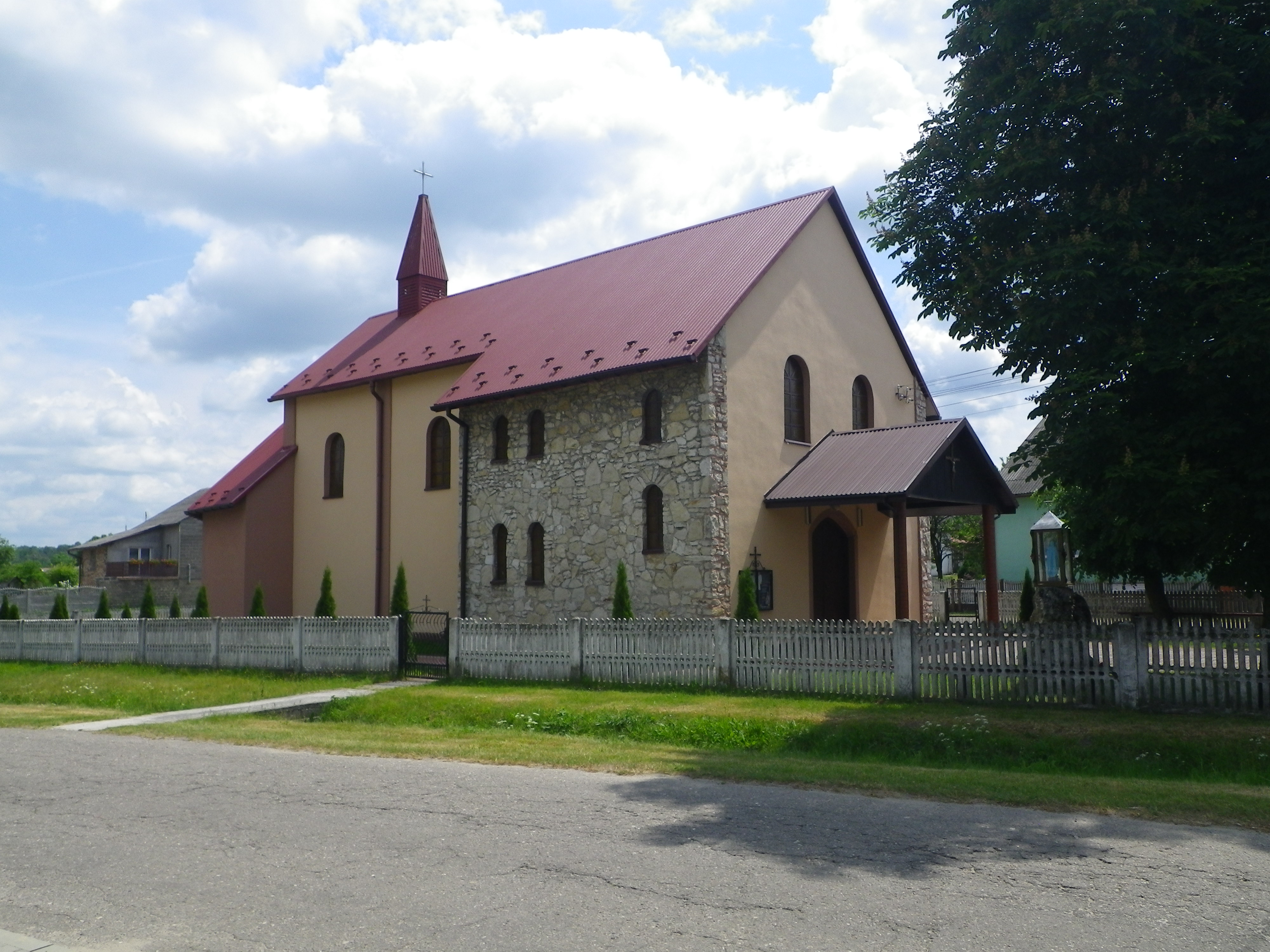
- Catholic church

- Location within Poland
- Coordinates: 50°36′N 19°32′E
- Country: Poland
- Voivodeship: Silesian
- County: Zawiercie
- Gmina: Włodowice

Zdów [zduf] is a village in the administrative district of Gmina Włodowice, within Zawiercie County, Silesian Voivodeship, in southern Poland.
