= Szyce, Silesian Voivodeship =

Szyce
- Village
- Location within Poland
- Coordinates: 50°31′19″N 19°40′36″E
- Country: Poland
- Voivodeship: Silesian
- County: Zawiercie
- Gmina: Pilica
- Website: http://www.szyce.pl.tl

Szyce [ˈʂɨt͡sɛ] is a village in the administrative district of Gmina Pilica, within Zawiercie County, Silesian Voivodeship, in southern Poland.
