= Piaseczno, Silesian Voivodeship =

Piaseczno
- Village
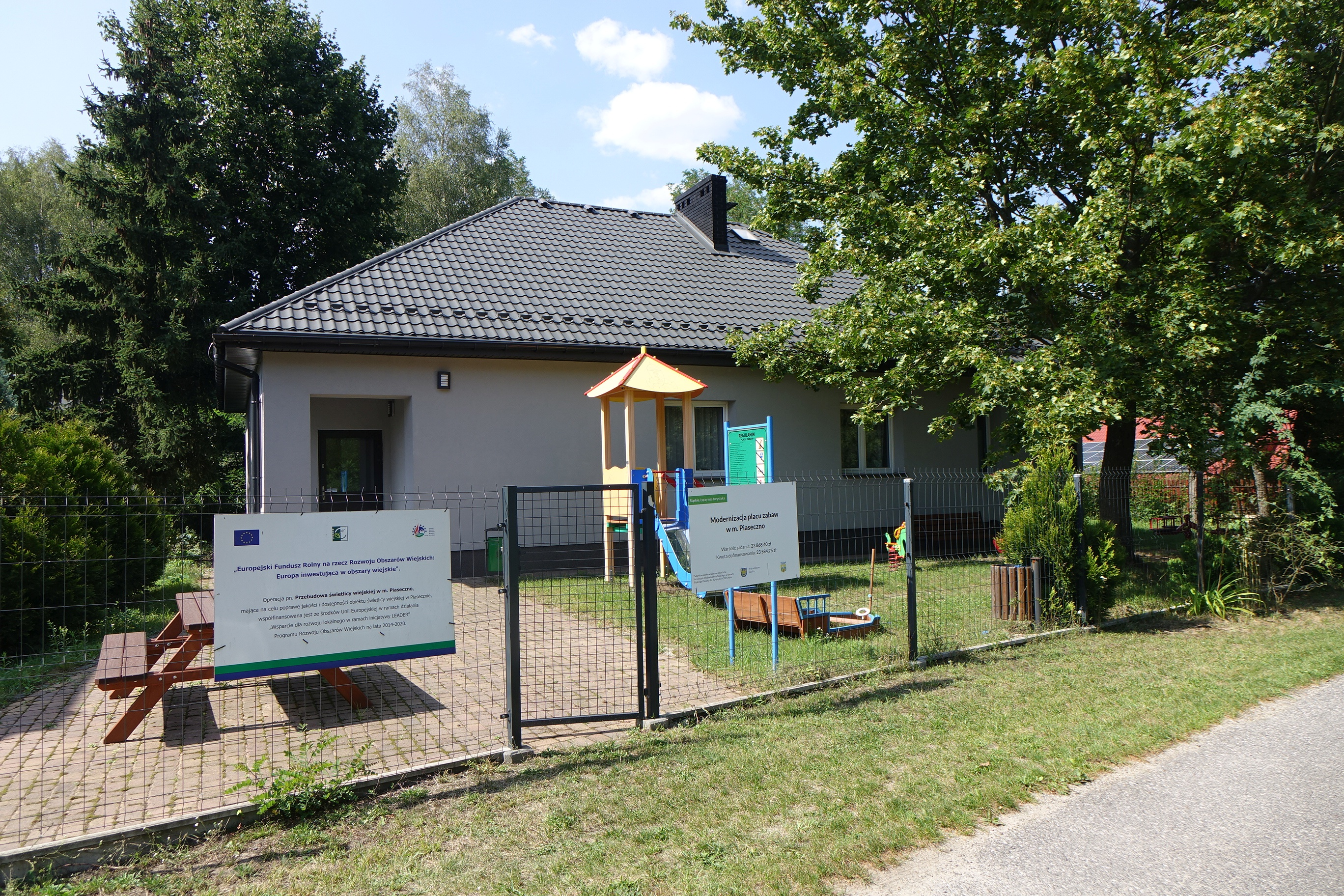
- School

- Location within Poland
- Coordinates: 50°32′1″N 19°31′52″E
- Country: Poland
- Voivodeship: Silesian
- County: Zawiercie
- Gmina: Kroczyce

Piaseczno [pjaˈsɛt͡ʂnɔ] is a village in the administrative district of Gmina Kroczyce, within Zawiercie County, Silesian Voivodeship, in southern Poland.
