= Dobrogoszczyce =

- Village
- Location within Poland
- Coordinates: 50°37′N 19°34′E
- Country: Poland
- Voivodeship: Silesian
- County: Zawiercie
- Gmina: Kroczyce

Dobrogoszczyce [dɔbrɔɡɔʂˈt͡ʂɨt͡sɛ] is a village in the administrative district of Gmina Kroczyce, within Zawiercie County, Silesian Voivodeship, in southern Poland.
