= Ryczów, Silesian Voivodeship =

Ryczów
- Village
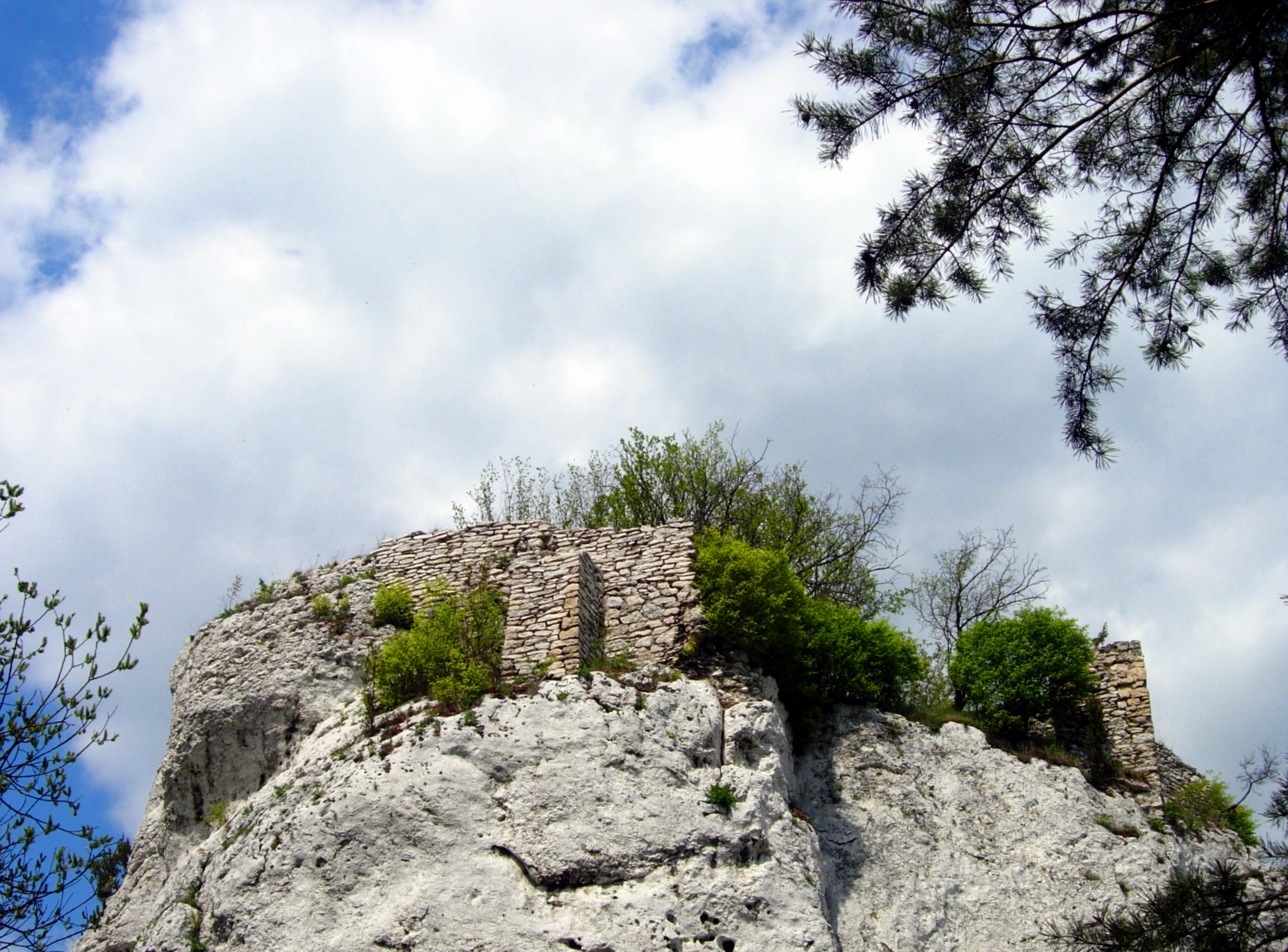
- Ruins of Ryczów castle

- Location within Poland
- Coordinates: 50°25′26″N 19°35′28″E
- Country: Poland
- Voivodeship: Silesian
- County: Zawiercie
- Gmina: Ogrodzieniec

Ryczów [ˈrɨt͡ʂuf] is a village in the administrative district of Gmina Ogrodzieniec, within Zawiercie County, Silesian Voivodeship, in southern Poland.

There are ruins of medieval tower (castle) abandoned in the 15th century and in decay ever since.
