= Jasieniec, Silesian Voivodeship =

Jasieniec
- Village
- Location within Poland
- Coordinates: 50°32′59″N 19°44′4″E
- Country: Poland
- Voivodeship: Silesian
- County: Zawiercie
- Gmina: Pilica

Jasieniec [jaˈɕɛɲɛt͡s] is a village in the administrative district of Gmina Pilica, within Zawiercie County, Silesian Voivodeship, in southern Poland.
