= Mikołajewice, Silesian Voivodeship =

Mikołajewice
- Village
- Location within Poland
- Coordinates: 50°37′13″N 19°39′12″E
- Country: Poland
- Voivodeship: Silesian
- County: Zawiercie
- Gmina: Irządze

Mikołajewice [mikɔwajɛˈvit͡sɛ] is a village in the administrative district of Gmina Irządze, within Zawiercie County, Silesian Voivodeship, in Southern Poland.
