= Siemięrzyce =

- Village
- Location within Poland
- Coordinates: 50°34′0″N 19°36′3″E
- Country: Poland
- Voivodeship: Silesian
- County: Zawiercie
- Gmina: Kroczyce

Siemięrzyce [ɕɛmjɛ̃ˈʐɨt͡sɛ] is a village in the administrative district of Gmina Kroczyce, within Zawiercie County, Silesian Voivodeship, in southern Poland.
