= Witów, Silesian Voivodeship =

Witów
- Village
- Location within Poland
- Coordinates: 50°39′5″N 19°41′44″E
- Country: Poland
- Voivodeship: Silesian
- County: Zawiercie
- Gmina: Irządze

Witów [ˈvituf] is a village in the administrative district of Gmina Irządze, within Zawiercie County, Silesian Voivodeship, in southern Poland.
