= Sierbowice =

- Village
- Location within Poland
- Coordinates: 50°31′21″N 19°39′2″E
- Country: Poland
- Voivodeship: Silesian
- County: Zawiercie
- Gmina: Pilica

Sierbowice [ɕɛrbɔˈvit͡sɛ] is a village in the administrative district of Gmina Pilica, within Zawiercie County, Silesian Voivodeship, in southern Poland.
