= Gołuchowice, Zawiercie County =

Gołuchowice
- Village
- Location within Poland
- Coordinates: 50°34′35″N 19°36′46″E
- Country: Poland
- Voivodeship: Silesian
- County: Zawiercie
- Gmina: Kroczyce

Gołuchowice [ɡɔwuxɔˈvit͡sɛ] is a village in the administrative district of Gmina Kroczyce, within Zawiercie County, Silesian Voivodeship, in southern Poland.
