= Huta Szklana, Silesian Voivodeship =

Huta Szklana
- Village
- Location within Poland
- Coordinates: 50°33′18″N 19°37′49″E
- Country: Poland
- Voivodeship: Silesian
- County: Zawiercie
- Gmina: Kroczyce

Huta Szklana [ˈxuta ˈʂklana] is a village in the administrative district of Gmina Kroczyce, within Zawiercie County, Silesian Voivodeship, in southern Poland.
