= Giebło-Kolonia =

- Village
- Location within Poland
- Coordinates: 50°27′48″N 19°35′44″E
- Country: Poland
- Voivodeship: Silesian
- County: Zawiercie
- Gmina: Ogrodzieniec

Giebło-Kolonia [ˈɡʲɛbwɔ kɔˈlɔɲa] is a village in the administrative district of Gmina Ogrodzieniec, within Zawiercie County, Silesian Voivodeship, in southern Poland.
