= Woźniki, Zawiercie County =

Woźniki
- Village
- Location within Poland
- Coordinates: 50°37′41″N 19°37′57″E
- Country: Poland
- Voivodeship: Silesian
- County: Zawiercie
- Gmina: Irządze

Woźniki [vɔʑˈniki] is a village in the administrative district of Gmina Irządze, within Zawiercie County, Silesian Voivodeship, in southern Poland.

== History ==
Woźniki is one of the oldest villages in the Wadowice region, founded in the 12th century. In 1242, the voivode of Opole and castellan of Oświęcim, Klement of Ruszcza, exchanged Woźniki for Podłęże and Ostrów near Kraków with the Benedictine monks from Tyniec. Later, the village came into the possession of Mikołaj Bychko (Byczko), Marek's brother-in-law from Poręba, who sold Woźniki in 1324 to the Cistercians from Mogyła, who owned it until the end of the 17th century. As part of the Josephine reforms, after confiscation in 1806, the Austrian government sold Woźniki to Count. T. Dzieduszycki, whose daughter Paulina sold the entire estate to Tytus Drohojowski. At the end of the 19th century, Józefa Błażowska, née Drohojowska, had a small amount of arable land in Woźniki, while the remaining part was parceled out.
