= Podzamcze, Silesian Voivodeship =

Podzamcze
- Village
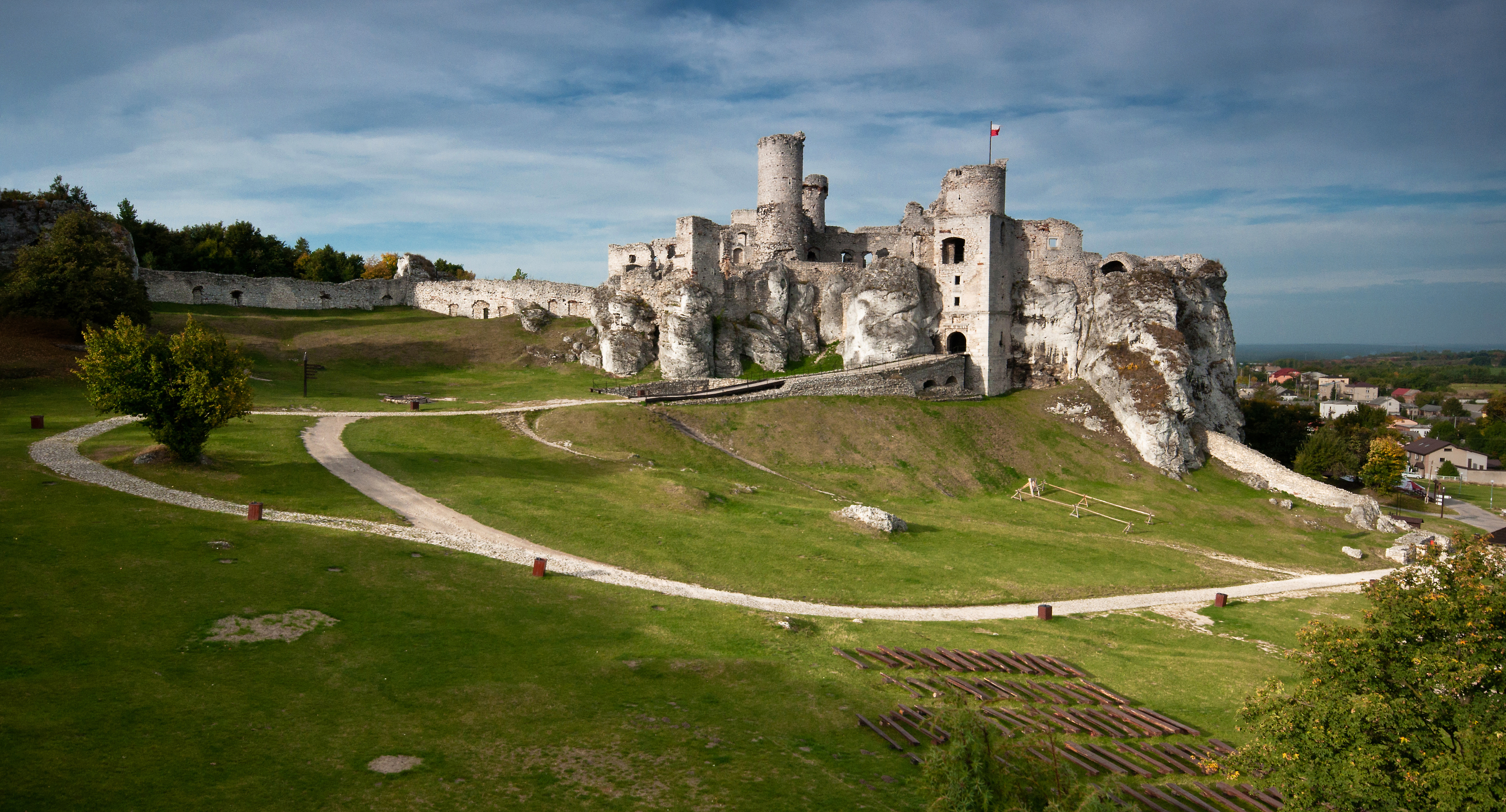
- Ogrodzieniec Castle

- Location within Poland
- Coordinates: 50°27′17″N 19°32′51″E
- Country: Poland
- Voivodeship: Silesian
- County: Zawiercie
- Gmina: Ogrodzieniec

Population
  - Total: 1,011

Podzamcze [pɔˈd͡zamt͡ʂɛ] is a village in the administrative district of Gmina Ogrodzieniec, within Zawiercie County, Silesian Voivodeship, in southern Poland.
