= Cisowa, Silesian Voivodeship =

Cisowa
- Village
- Location within Poland
- Coordinates: 50°26′59″N 19°42′53″E
- Country: Poland
- Voivodeship: Silesian
- County: Zawiercie
- Gmina: Pilica

Cisowa [t͡ɕiˈsɔva] is a village in the administrative district of Gmina Pilica, within Zawiercie County, Silesian Voivodeship, in southern Poland.
