= Zawadka, Silesian Voivodeship =

Zawadka
- Village
- Location within Poland
- Coordinates: 50°37′59″N 19°43′26″E
- Country: Poland
- Voivodeship: Silesian
- County: Zawiercie
- Gmina: Irządze

Zawadka [zaˈvatka] is a village in the administrative district of Gmina Irządze, within Zawiercie County, Silesian Voivodeship, in southern Poland.
