= Parkoszowice, Silesian Voivodeship =

Parkoszowice
- Village
- Location within Poland
- Coordinates: 50°32′18″N 19°27′48″E
- Country: Poland
- Voivodeship edible: Silesian
- County: Zawiercie
- Gmina: Włodowice

Parkoszowice [parkɔʂɔˈvit͡sɛ] is a village in the administrative district of Gmina Włodowice, within Zawiercie County, Silesian Voivodeship, in southern Poland.
