= Dzwono-Sierbowice =

- Village
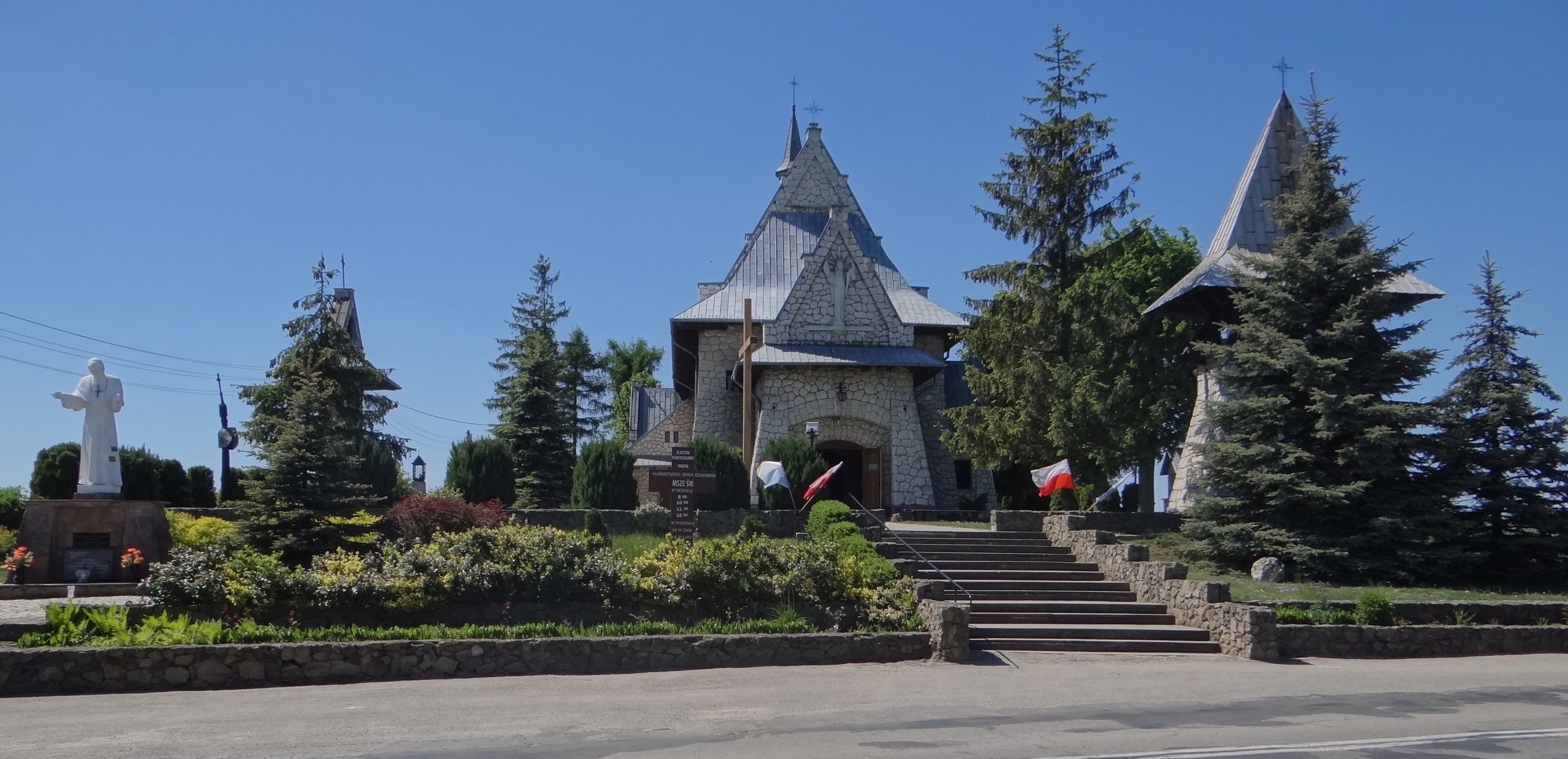
- Catholic church

- Location within Poland
- Coordinates: 50°30′31″N 19°38′54″E
- Country: Poland
- Voivodeship: Silesian
- County: Zawiercie
- Gmina: Pilica

Dzwono-Sierbowice [ˈd͡zvɔnɔ ɕɛrbɔˈvit͡sɛ] is a village in the administrative district of Gmina Pilica, within Zawiercie County, Silesian Voivodeship, in southern Poland.
