= Kostkowice =

Kostkowice may refer to the following villages in Poland:

- Kostkowice, Cieszyn County in Silesian Voivodeship (south Poland)
- Kostkowice, Zawiercie County in Silesian Voivodeship (south Poland)
