= Dzwonowice =

- Village
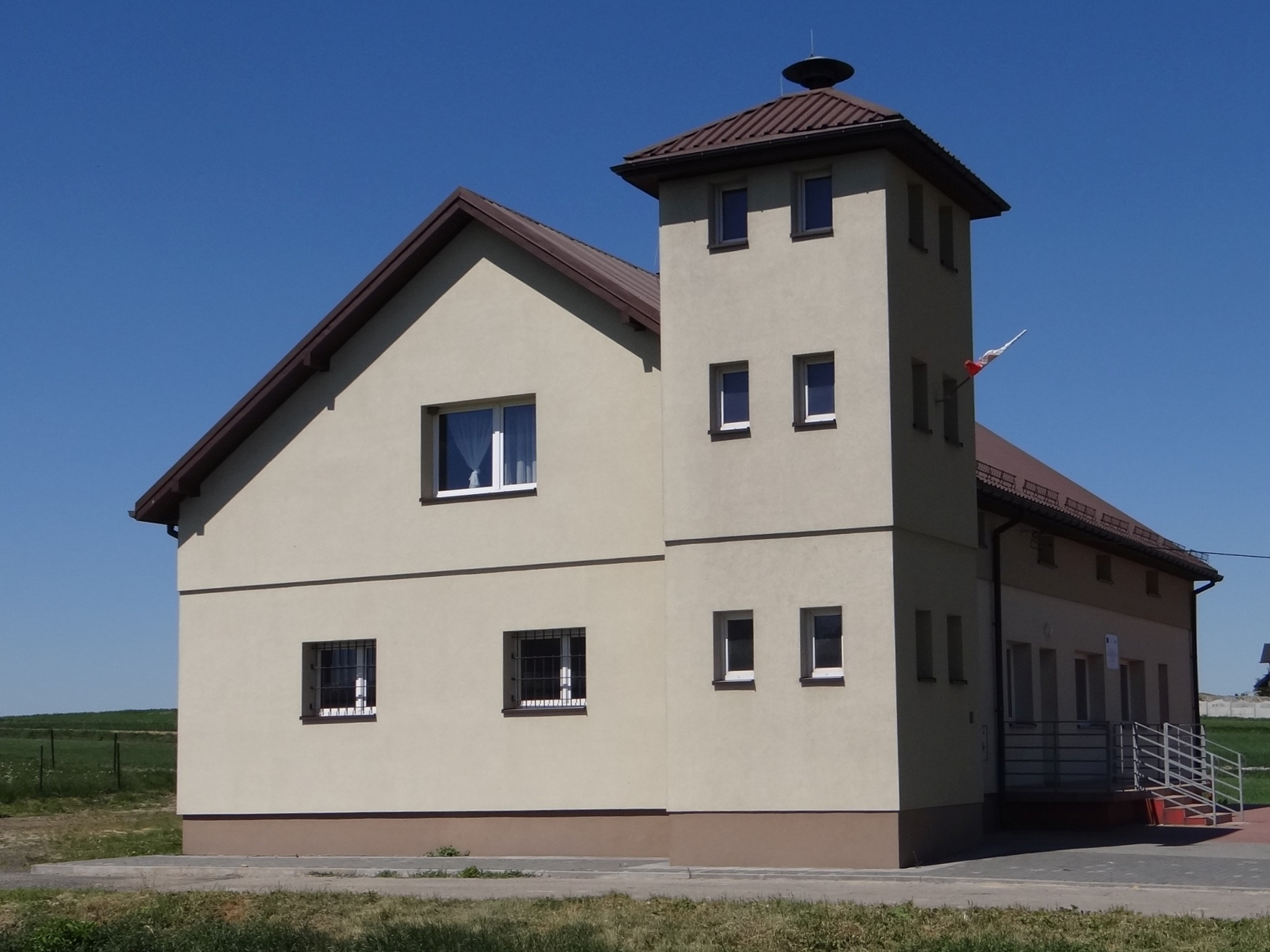
- Fire station

- Location within Poland
- Coordinates: 50°31′N 19°40′E
- Country: Poland
- Voivodeship: Silesian
- County: Zawiercie
- Gmina: Pilica

Dzwonowice [d͡zvɔnɔˈvit͡sɛ] is a village in the administrative district of Gmina Pilica, within Zawiercie County, Silesian Voivodeship, in southern Poland.
