= Dobra, Silesian Voivodeship =

Dobra
- Village
- Location within Poland
- Coordinates: 50°28′24″N 19°40′37″E
- Country: Poland
- Voivodeship: Silesian
- County: Zawiercie
- Gmina: Pilica

Dobra [ˈdɔbra] is a village in the administrative district of Gmina Pilica, within Zawiercie County, Silesian Voivodeship, in southern Poland.
