= Kidów =

- Village
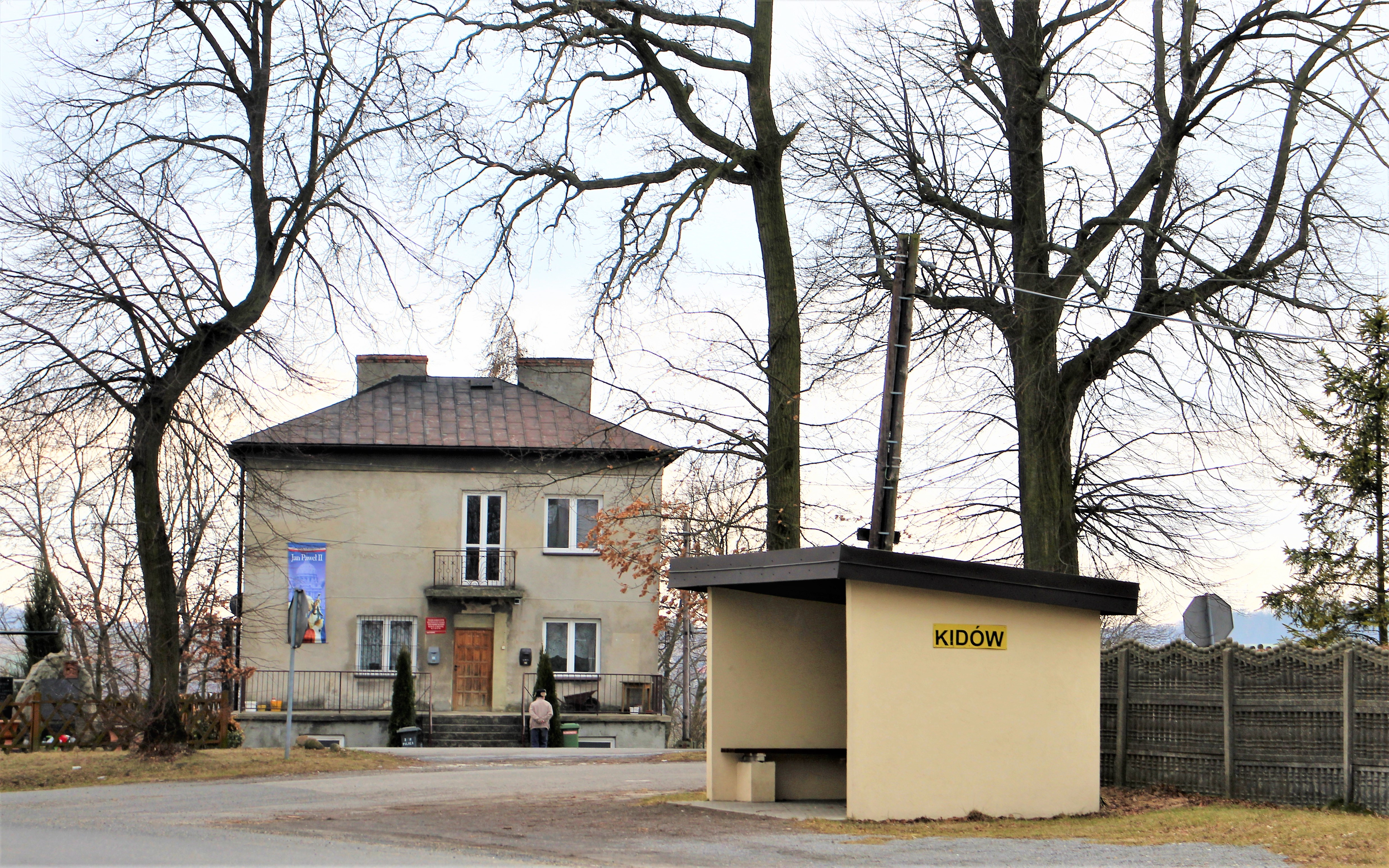

- Location within Poland
- Coordinates: 50°30′19″N 19°42′1″E
- Country: Poland
- Voivodeship: Silesian
- County: Zawiercie
- Gmina: Pilica

Kidów [ˈkiduf] is a village in the administrative district of Gmina Pilica, within Zawiercie County, Silesian Voivodeship, in southern Poland.
