= Browarek =

- Village
- Location within Poland
- Coordinates: 50°35′51″N 19°37′1″E
- Country: Poland
- Voivodeship: Silesian
- County: Zawiercie
- Gmina: Kroczyce

Browarek ([brɔˈvarɛk]; translation: Beer) is a village in the administrative district of Gmina Kroczyce, within Zawiercie County, Silesian Voivodeship, in southern Poland.
