= Wilgoszcza =

- Village
- Location within Poland
- Coordinates: 50°39′N 19°40′E
- Country: Poland
- Voivodeship: Silesian
- County: Zawiercie
- Gmina: Irządze

Wilgoszcza [vilˈɡɔʂt͡ʂa] is a village in the administrative district of Gmina Irządze, within Zawiercie County, Silesian Voivodeship, in southern Poland.
