= Kroczyce Okupne =

- Village
- Location within Poland
- Coordinates: 50°34′4″N 19°34′47″E
- Country: Poland
- Voivodeship: Silesian
- County: Zawiercie
- Gmina: Kroczyce

Kroczyce Okupne [krɔˈt͡ʂɨt͡sɛ ɔˈkupnɛ] is a village in the administrative district of Gmina Kroczyce, within Zawiercie County, Silesian Voivodeship, in southern Poland.
