= Szypowice =

- Village
- Location within Poland
- Coordinates: 50°31′N 19°37′E
- Country: Poland
- Voivodeship: Silesian
- County: Zawiercie
- Gmina: Kroczyce

Szypowice [ʂɨpɔˈvit͡sɛ] is a village in the administrative district of Gmina Kroczyce, within Zawiercie County, Silesian Voivodeship, in southern Poland.
