= Kocikowa =

- Village
- Location within Poland
- Coordinates: 50°27′40″N 19°36′39″E
- Country: Poland
- Voivodeship: Silesian
- County: Zawiercie
- Gmina: Pilica

Kocikowa [kɔt͡ɕiˈkɔva] is a village in the administrative district of Gmina Pilica, within Zawiercie County, Silesian Voivodeship, in southern Poland.
