= Przychody, Silesian Voivodeship =

Przychody
- Village
- Location within Poland
- Coordinates: 50°29′49″N 19°43′59″E
- Country: Poland
- Voivodeship: Silesian
- County: Zawiercie
- Gmina: Pilica

Przychody [pʂɨˈxɔdɨ] is a village in the administrative district of Gmina Pilica, within Zawiercie County, Silesian Voivodeship, in southern Poland.
