= Ryczów-Kolonia =

- Village
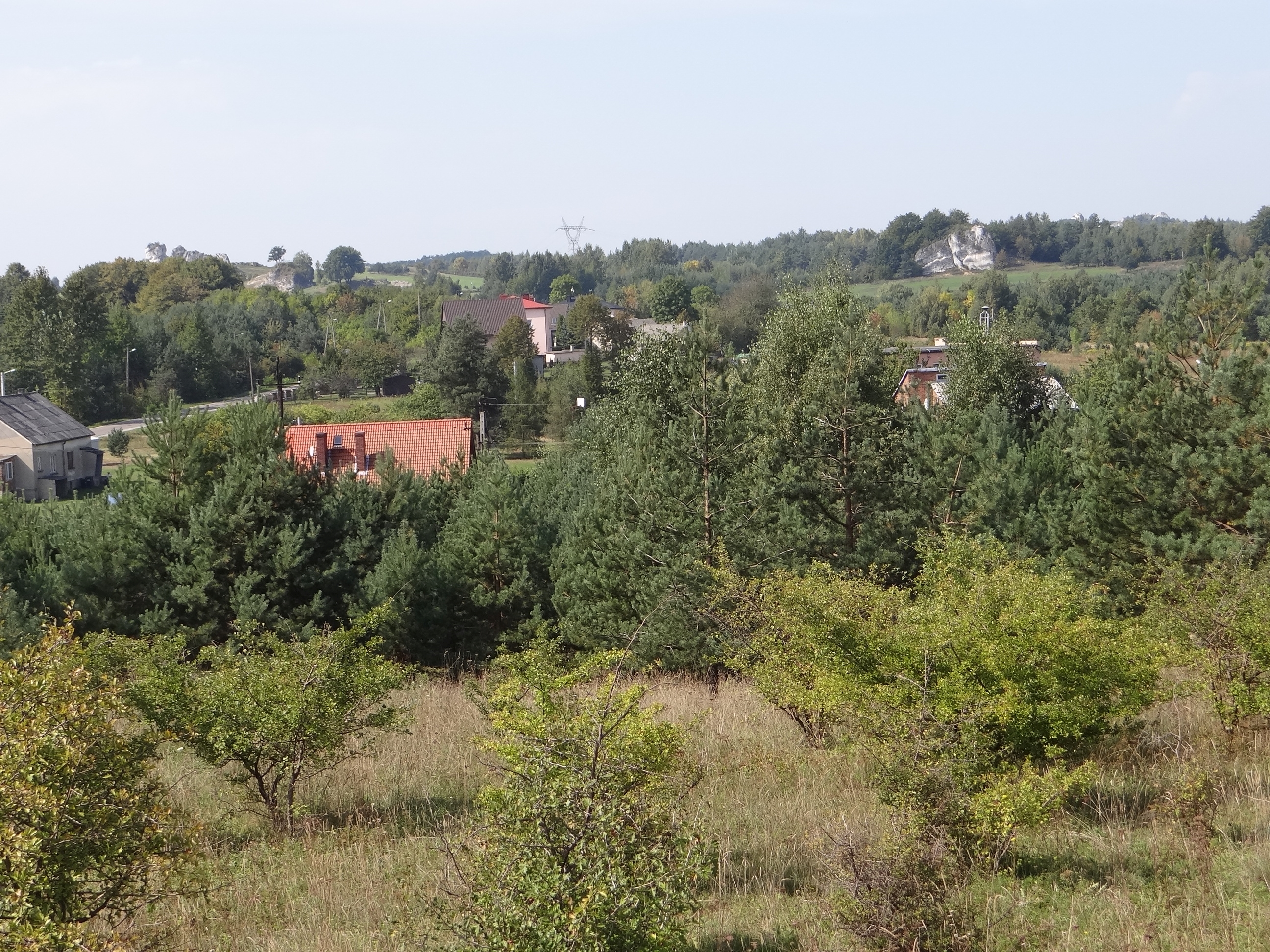

- Location within Poland
- Coordinates: 50°26′9″N 19°34′33″E
- Country: Poland
- Voivodeship: Silesian
- County: Zawiercie
- Gmina: Ogrodzieniec

Ryczów-Kolonia [ˈrɨt͡ʂuf kɔˈlɔɲa] is a village in the administrative district of Gmina Ogrodzieniec, within Zawiercie County, Silesian Voivodeship, in southern Poland.
