= Pradła =

- Village
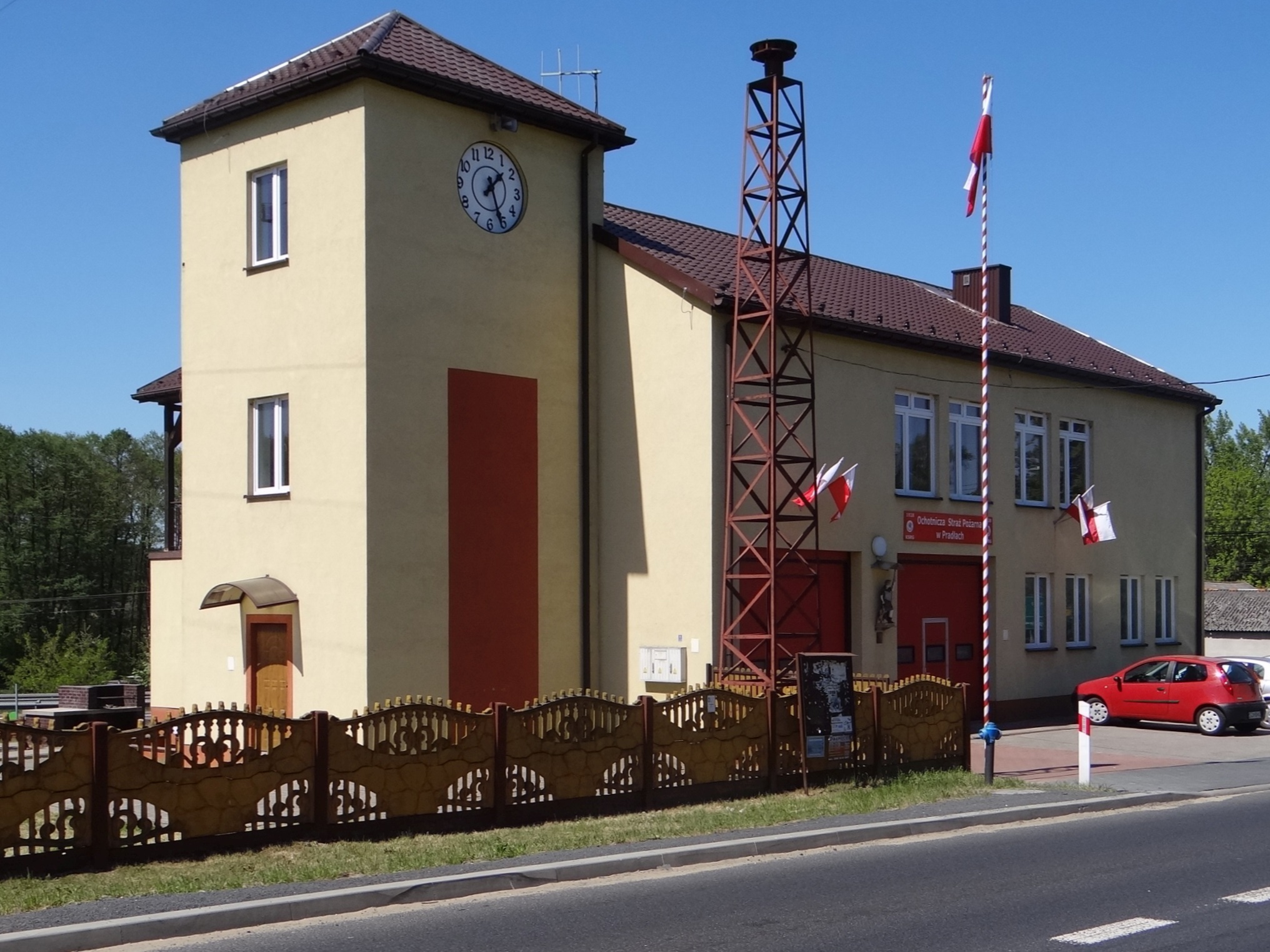
- Fire station

- Location within Poland
- Coordinates: 50°34′N 19°39′E
- Country: Poland
- Voivodeship: Silesian
- County: Zawiercie
- Gmina: Kroczyce
- Time zone: UTC+1 (CET)
  - Summer (DST): UTC+2 (CEST)
- Vehicle registration: SZA

Pradła [ˈpradwa] is a village in the administrative district of Gmina Kroczyce, within Zawiercie County, Silesian Voivodeship, in southern Poland.

== History ==
Following the German-Soviet invasion of Poland, which started World War II in September 1939, it was occupied by Germany until 1945. On 26 July 1944, the Polish Home Army conducted a successful ambush against Russian collaborators of Nazi Germany.
