= Podlesice, Silesian Voivodeship =

Podlesice
- Village
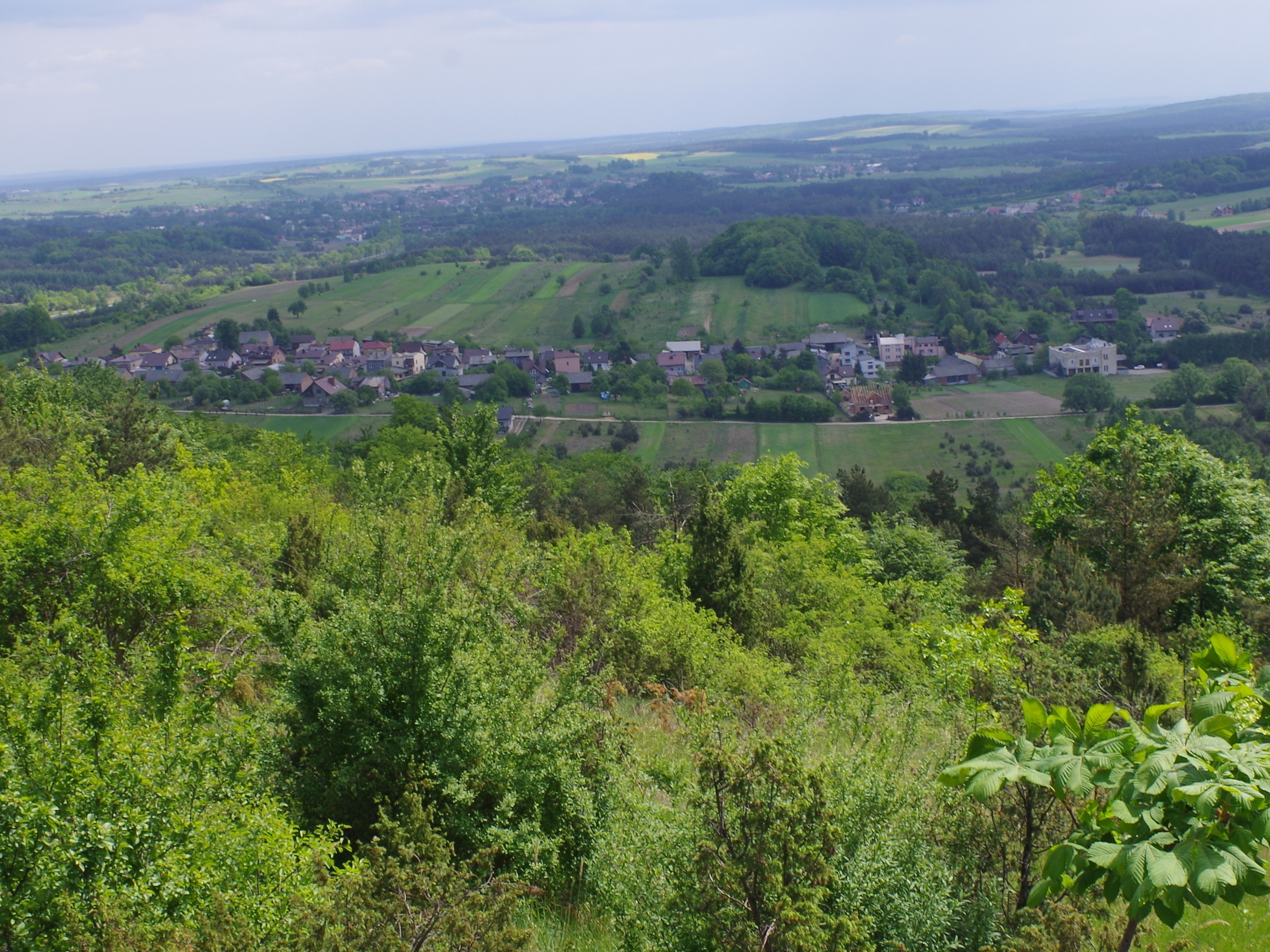

- Location within Poland
- Coordinates: 50°33′N 19°32′E
- Country: Poland
- Voivodeship: Silesian
- County: Zawiercie
- Gmina: Kroczyce

Podlesice [pɔdlɛˈɕit͡sɛ] is a village in the administrative district of Gmina Kroczyce, within Zawiercie County, Silesian Voivodeship, in southern Poland.
