= Giebło =

- Village
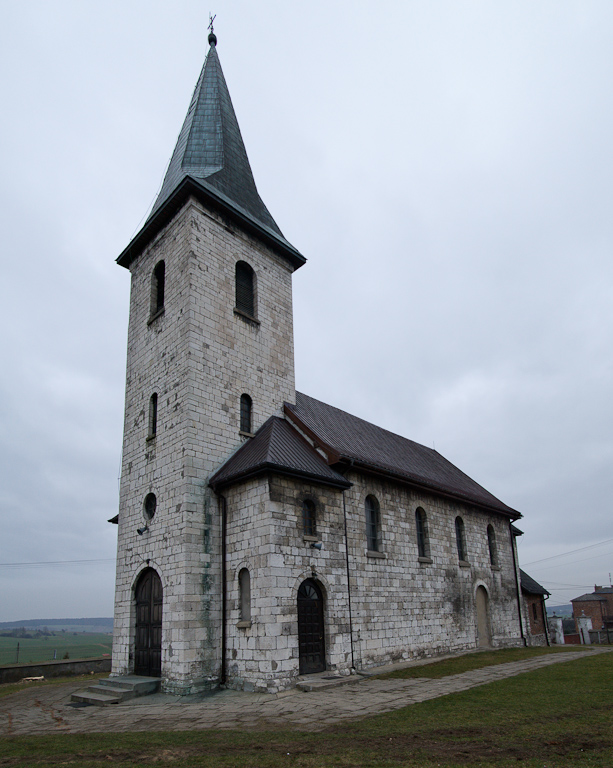
- Saint James, the Apostle Church

- Location within Poland
- Coordinates: 50°28′51″N 19°36′12″E
- Country: Poland
- Voivodeship: Silesian
- County: Zawiercie
- Gmina: Ogrodzieniec

Giebło [ˈɡʲɛbwɔ] is a village in the administrative district of Gmina Ogrodzieniec, within Zawiercie County, Silesian Voivodeship, in southern Poland.
