= Fugasówka =

- Village
- Location within Poland
- Coordinates: 50°28′N 19°29′E
- Country: Poland
- Voivodeship: Silesian
- County: Zawiercie
- Gmina: Ogrodzieniec

Fugasówka [fuɡaˈsufka] is a village in the administrative district of Gmina Ogrodzieniec, within Zawiercie County, Silesian Voivodeship, in southern Poland.
