= Wygiełzów, Silesian Voivodeship =

Wygiełzów
- Village
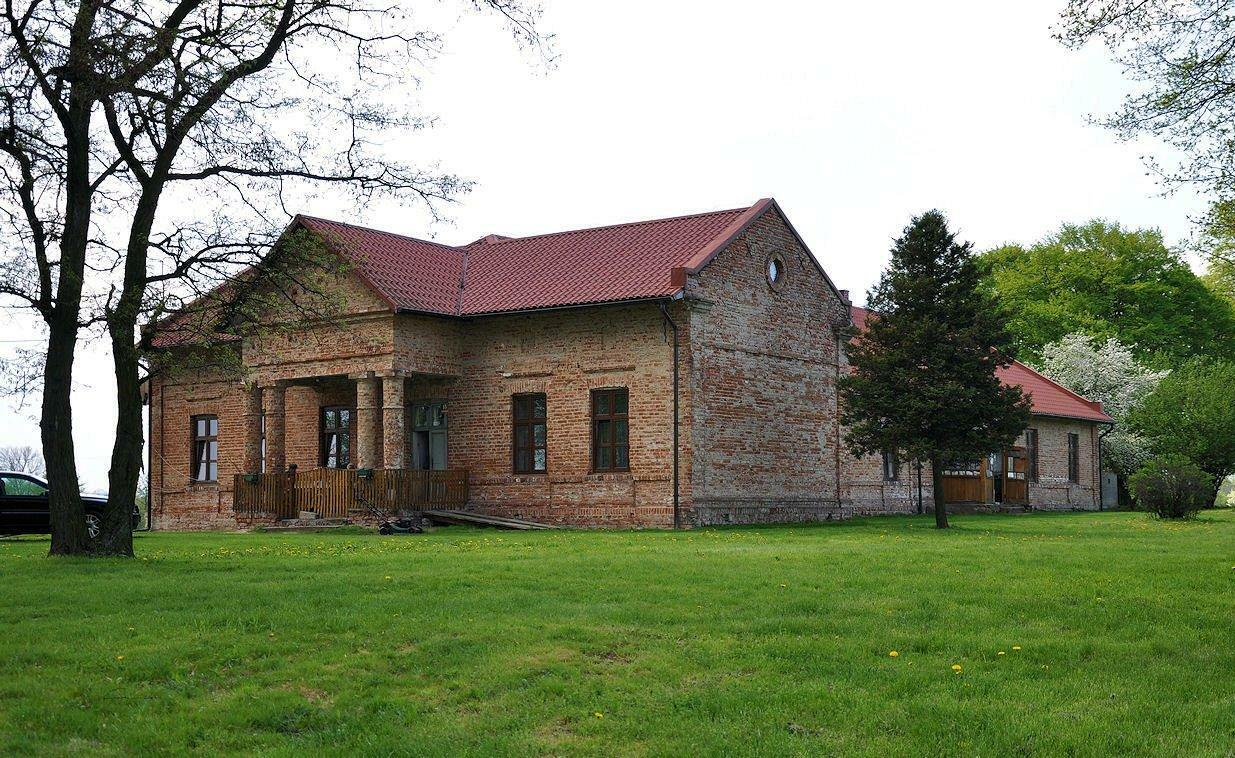

- Location within Poland
- Coordinates: 50°38′29″N 19°41′38″E
- Country: Poland
- Voivodeship: Silesian
- County: Zawiercie
- Gmina: Irządze

Wygiełzów [vɨˈɡʲɛu̯zuf] is a village in the administrative district of Gmina Irządze, within Zawiercie County, Silesian Voivodeship, in southern Poland.
