= Góra Włodowska =

- Village
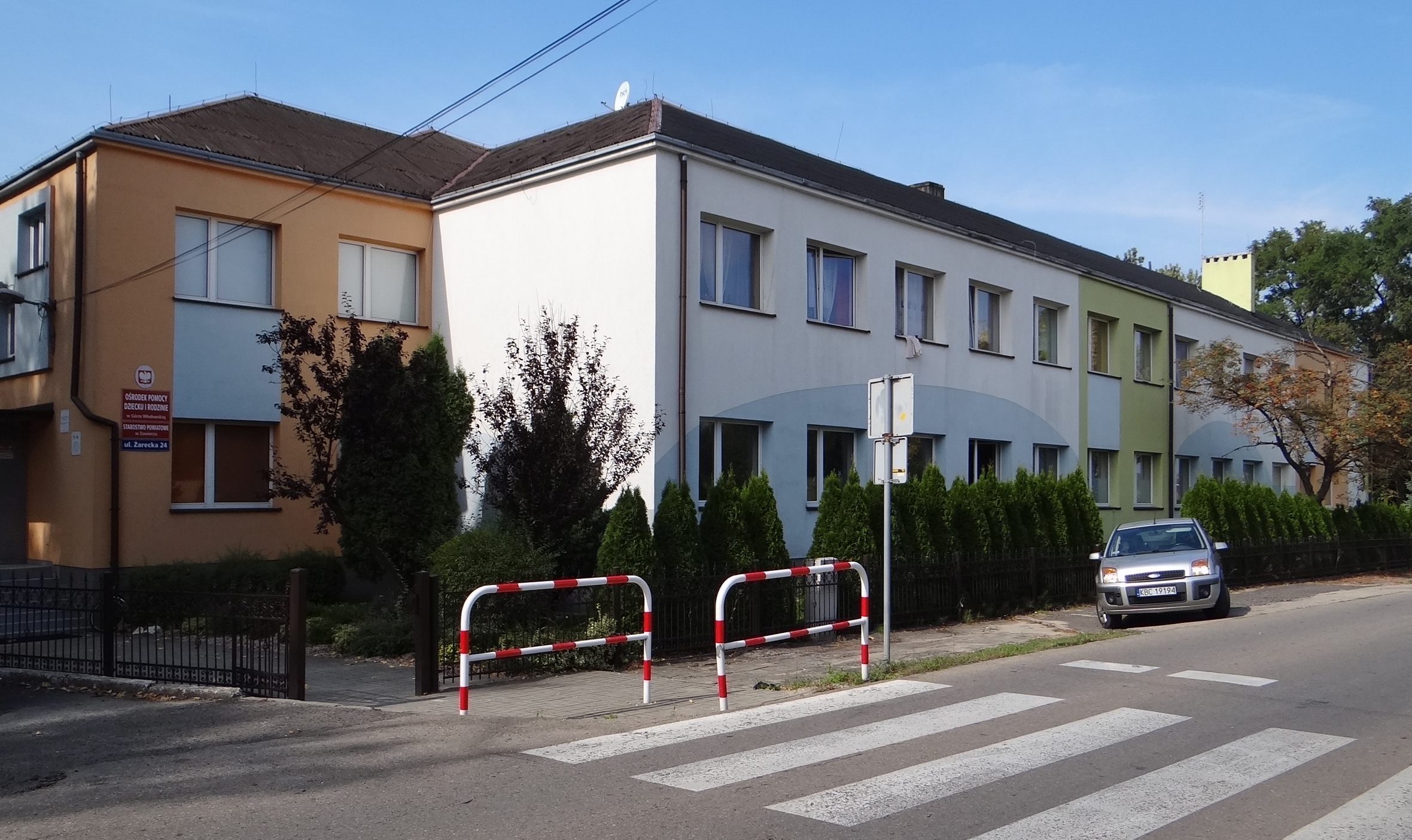

- Location within Poland
- Coordinates: 50°34′34″N 19°26′52″E
- Country: Poland
- Voivodeship: Silesian
- County: Zawiercie
- Gmina: Włodowice

Góra Włodowska [ˈɡura vwɔˈdɔfska] is a village in the administrative district of Gmina Włodowice, within Zawiercie County, Silesian Voivodeship, in southern Poland.
