= Rudniki, Zawiercie County =

Rudniki
- Village
- Location within Poland
- Coordinates: 50°31′15″N 19°25′52″E
- Country: Poland
- Voivodeship: Silesian
- County: Zawiercie
- Gmina: Włodowice

Rudniki [rudˈniki] is a village in the administrative district of Gmina Włodowice, within Zawiercie County, Silesian Voivodeship, in southern Poland.
