= Zawada Pilicka =

- Village
- Location within Poland
- Coordinates: 50°36′52″N 19°43′12″E
- Country: Poland
- Voivodeship: Silesian
- County: Zawiercie
- Gmina: Irządze

Zawada Pilicka [zaˈvada piˈlit͡ska] is a village in the administrative district of Gmina Irządze, within Zawiercie County, Silesian Voivodeship, in southern Poland.
