= Solca, Poland =

Solca
- Village
- Location within Poland
- Coordinates: 50°32′5″N 19°43′0″E
- Country: Poland
- Voivodeship: Silesian
- County: Zawiercie
- Gmina: Pilica

Solca [ˈsɔlt͡sa] is a village in the administrative district of Gmina Pilica, within Zawiercie County, Silesian Voivodeship, in southern Poland.
