= Kleszczowa =

- Village
- Location within Poland
- Coordinates: 50°28′13″N 19°45′0″E
- Country: Poland
- Voivodeship: Silesian
- County: Zawiercie
- Gmina: Pilica

Kleszczowa [klɛʂˈt͡ʂɔva] is a village in the administrative district of Gmina Pilica, within Zawiercie County, Silesian Voivodeship, in southern Poland.
