= Biskupice, Zawiercie County =

Biskupice
- Village
- Location within Poland
- Coordinates: 50°28′16″N 19°38′36″E
- Country: Poland
- Voivodeship: Silesian
- County: Zawiercie
- Gmina: Pilica

Biskupice [biskuˈpit͡sɛ] is a village in the administrative district of Gmina Pilica, within Zawiercie County, Silesian Voivodeship, in southern Poland.
