= Trzciniec, Silesian Voivodeship =

Trzciniec
- Village
- Location within Poland
- Coordinates: 50°33′N 19°45′E
- Country: Poland
- Voivodeship: Silesian
- County: Zawiercie
- Gmina: Kroczyce

Trzciniec [ˈtʂt͡ɕiɲɛt͡s] is a village in the administrative district of Gmina Kroczyce, within Zawiercie County, Silesian Voivodeship, in southern Poland.
