= Markowizna, Silesian Voivodeship =

Markowizna
- Village
- Location within Poland
- Coordinates: 50°28′18″N 19°27′23″E
- Country: Poland
- Voivodeship: Silesian
- County: Zawiercie
- Gmina: Ogrodzieniec

Markowizna [markɔˈvizna] is a village in the Gmina Ogrodzieniec, Zawiercie County, Silesian Voivodeship, Poland.
