= Zawada, Będzin County =

Zawada
- Village
- Location within Poland
- Coordinates: 50°26′11″N 19°5′34″E
- Country: Poland
- Voivodeship: Silesian
- County: Będzin
- Gmina: Mierzęcice
- Population: 159

Zawada [zaˈvada] is a village in the administrative district of Gmina Mierzęcice, within Będzin County, Silesian Voivodeship, in southern Poland.
