= Kostkowice, Zawiercie County =

Kostkowice
- Village
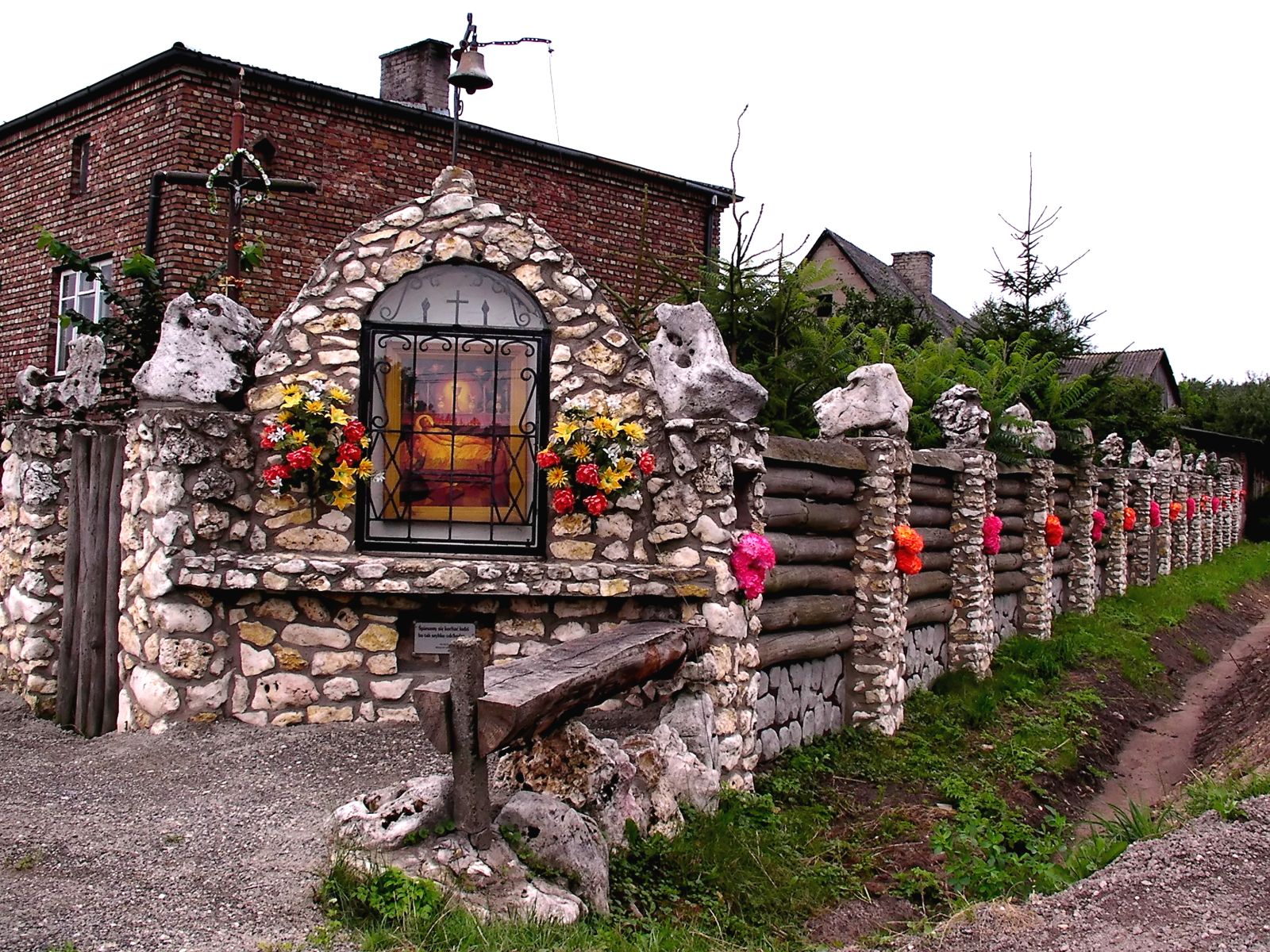

- Location within Poland
- Coordinates: 50°35′3″N 19°34′29″E
- Country: Poland
- Voivodeship: Silesian
- County: Zawiercie
- Gmina: Kroczyce

Kostkowice [kɔstkɔˈvit͡sɛ] is a village in the administrative district of Gmina Kroczyce, within Zawiercie County, Silesian Voivodeship, in southern Poland.
