= Irządze, Silesian Voivodeship =

Irządze
- Village
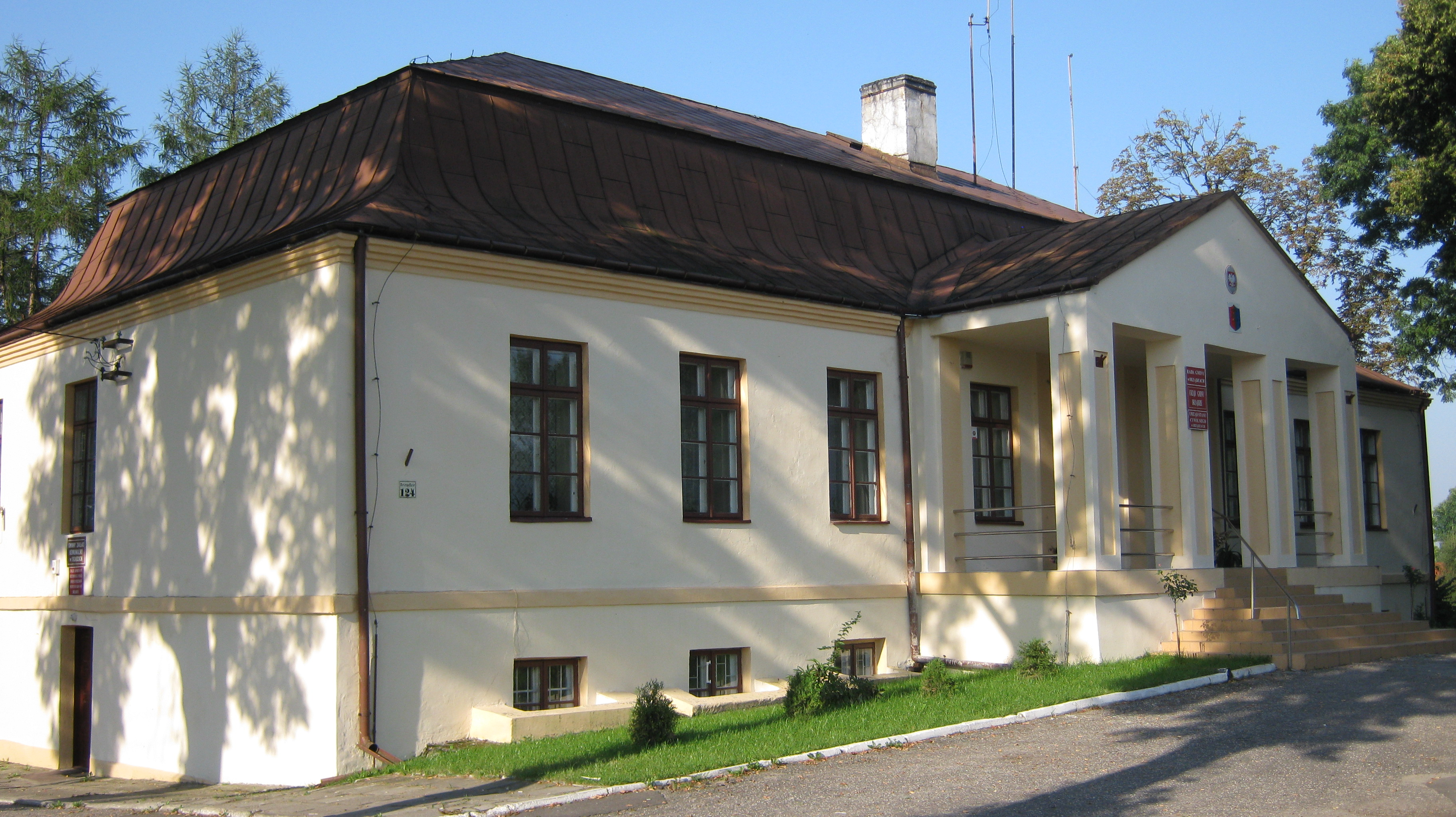
- Manor house

- Location within Poland
- Coordinates: 50°37′35″N 19°41′7″E
- Country: Poland
- Voivodeship: Silesian
- County: Zawiercie
- Gmina: Irządze
- Population: 840
- Website: http://www.irzadze.pl

Irządze [iˈʐɔnd͡zɛ] is a village in Zawiercie County, Silesian Voivodeship, in southern Poland. It is the seat of the gmina (administrative district) called Gmina Irządze.
