= Gmina Mierzęcice =

Gmina Mierzęcice Mierzęcice Commune
- Gmina
- Coat of arms
- Interactive map of Gmina Mierzęcice
- Coordinates (Mierzęcice): 50°26′39″N 19°7′43″E
- Country: Poland
- Voivodeship: Silesian
- County: Będzin
- Seat: Mierzęcice

Area
  - Total: 51.27 km^{2} (19.80 sq mi)

Population (2019-06-30)
  - Total: 7,676
  - Density: 149.7/km^{2} (387.8/sq mi)
- Website: http://www.mierzecice.pl/

Gmina Mierzęcice is a rural gmina (administrative district) in Będzin County, Silesian Voivodeship, in southern Poland. Its seat is the village of Mierzęcice, which lies approximately 13 kilometres (8 mi) north of Będzin and 24 km (15 mi) north-east of the regional capital Katowice.

The gmina covers an area of 51.27 square kilometres (19.8 sq mi), and as of 2019 its total population is 7,676.

== Villages ==
Gmina Mierzęcice contains the villages and settlements of Boguchwałowice, Mierzęcice, Mierzęcice Osiedle, Najdziszów, Nowa Wieś, Przeczyce, Sadowie, Toporowice and Zawada.

== Neighbouring gminas ==
Gmina Mierzęcice is bordered by the gminas of Bobrowniki, Ożarowice, Psary and Siewierz.
