= Mierzęcice Osiedle =

- Village
- Location within Poland
- Coordinates: 50°27′39″N 19°5′31″E
- Country: Poland
- Voivodeship: Silesian
- County: Będzin
- Gmina: Mierzęcice

Mierzęcice Osiedle [mʲɛʐɛnˈt͡ɕit͡sɛ ɔˈɕɛdlɛ] is a village in the administrative district of Gmina Mierzęcice, within Będzin County, Silesian Voivodeship, in southern Poland.
