= Gmina Pilica =

Gmina Pilica Pilica Commune
- Gmina
- Coat of arms
- Interactive map of Gmina Pilica
- Coordinates (Pilica): 50°27′59″N 19°39′24″E
- Country: Poland
- Voivodeship: Silesian
- County: Zawiercie
- Seat: Pilica

Area
  - Total: 138.89 km^{2} (53.63 sq mi)

Population (2019-06-30)
  - Total: 8,625
  - Density: 62.10/km^{2} (160.8/sq mi)
  - Urban: 1,936
  - Rural: 6,689
- Website: http://www.pilica.pl

Gmina Pilica is an urban-rural gmina (administrative district) in Zawiercie County, Silesian Voivodeship, in southern Poland. Its seat is the town of Pilica, which lies approximately 18 kilometres (11 mi) east of Zawiercie and 53 km (33 mi) north-east of the regional capital Katowice.

The gmina covers an area of 138.89 square kilometres (53.6 sq mi), and as of 2019 its total population is 8,625.

== Villages ==
Apart from the town of Pilica, Gmina Pilica contains the villages and settlements of Biskupice, Cisowa, Dobra, Dobra-Kolonia, Dobraków, Dzwono-Sierbowice, Dzwonowice, Jasieniec, Kidów, Kleszczowa, Kocikowa, Podleśna, Przychody, Siadcza, Sierbowice, Sławniów, Smoleń, Solca, Szyce, Wierbka, Wierzbica, Zarzecze and Złożeniec.

== Neighbouring gminas ==
Gmina Pilica is bordered by the gminas of Klucze, Kroczyce, Ogrodzieniec, Szczekociny, Wolbrom and Żarnowiec.
