= Mierzęcice =

- Village
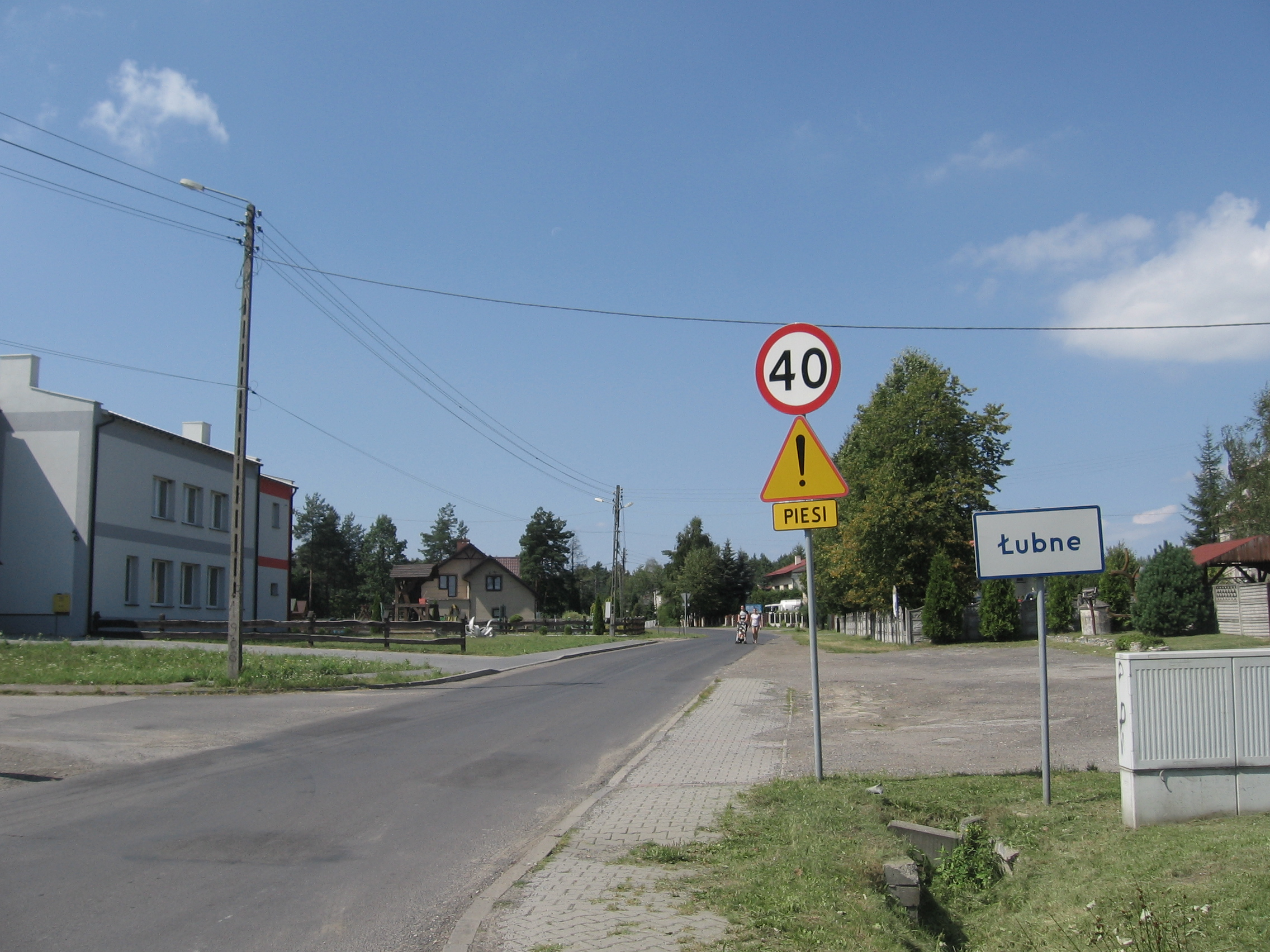

- Location within Poland
- Coordinates: 50°26′39″N 19°7′43″E
- Country: Poland
- Voivodeship: Silesian
- County: Będzin
- Gmina: Mierzęcice
- Population: 2,676

Mierzęcice [mʲɛʐɛɲˈt͡ɕit͡sɛ] (Silesian: Miercecyce) is a village in Będzin County, Silesian Voivodeship, in southern Poland. It is the seat of the gmina (administrative district) called Gmina Mierzęcice.
