= Kroczyce =

- Village
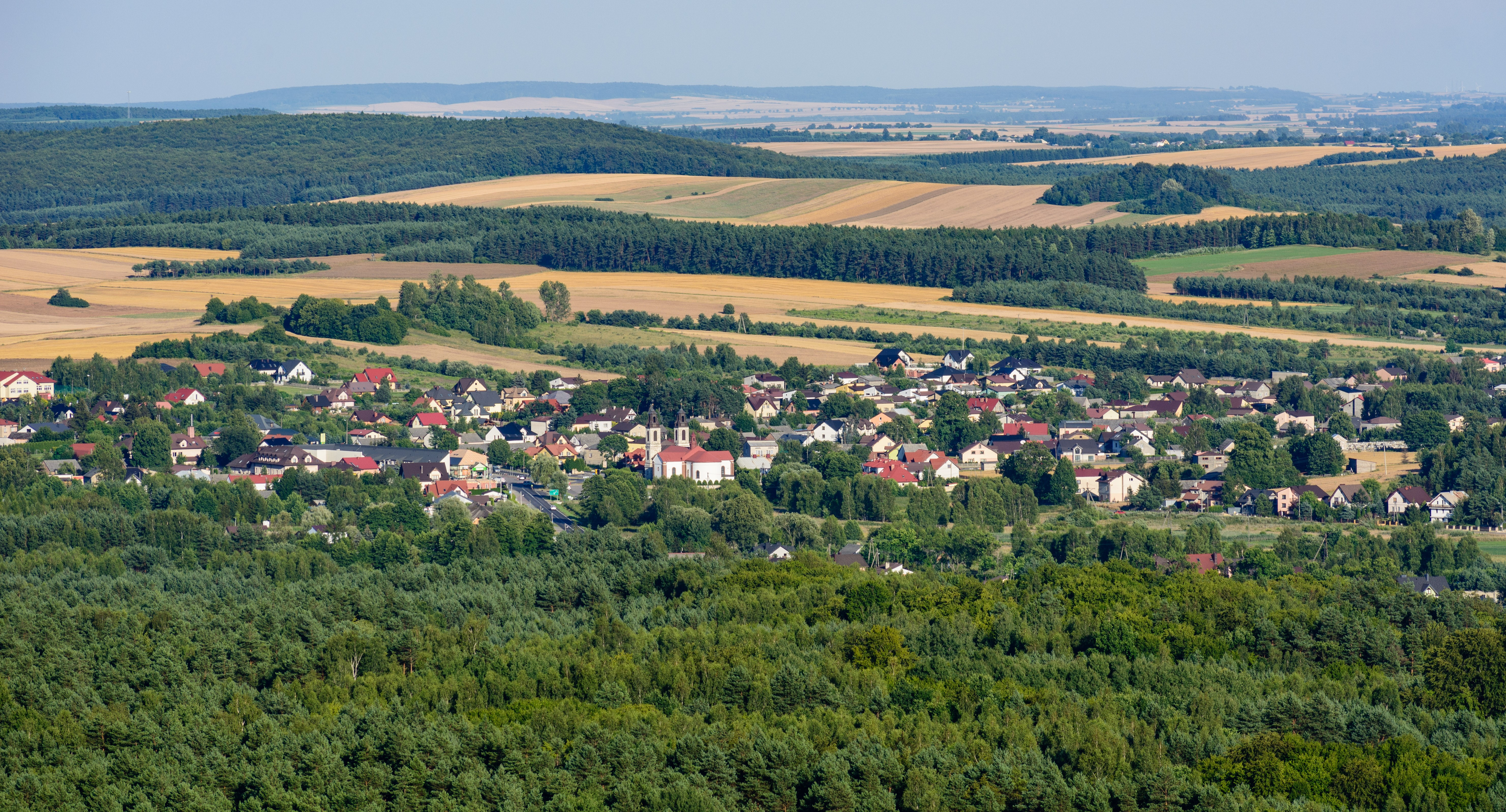

- Location within Poland
- Coordinates: 50°33′49″N 19°34′14″E
- Country: Poland
- Voivodeship: Silesian
- County: Zawiercie
- Gmina: Kroczyce
- Population: 1,500

Kroczyce [krɔˈt͡ʂɨt͡sɛ] is a village in Zawiercie County, Silesian Voivodeship, in southern Poland. It is the seat of the gmina (administrative district) called Gmina Kroczyce.
