= Nowa Wieś, Będzin County =

Nowa Wieś
- Village
- Location within Poland
- Coordinates: 50°26′N 19°5′E
- Country: Poland
- Voivodeship: Silesian
- County: Będzin
- Gmina: Mierzęcice
- Population: 809

Nowa Wieś [ˈnɔva ˈvʲɛɕ] is a village in the administrative district of Gmina Mierzęcice, within Będzin County, Silesian Voivodeship, in southern Poland.
