= Gmina Irządze =

Gmina Irządze Irządze Commune
- Gmina
- Coat of arms
- Interactive map of Gmina Irządze
- Coordinates (Irządze): 50°37′34″N 19°40′58″E
- Country: Poland
- Voivodeship: Silesian
- County: Zawiercie
- Seat: Irządze

Area
  - Total: 73.55 km^{2} (28.40 sq mi)

Population (2019-06-30)
  - Total: 2,623
  - Density: 35.66/km^{2} (92.37/sq mi)
- Website: http://www.irzadze.pl

Gmina Irządze is a rural gmina (administrative district) in Zawiercie County, Silesian Voivodeship, in southern Poland. Its seat is the village of Irządze, which lies approximately 24 kilometres (15 mi) north-east of Zawiercie and 64 km (40 mi) north-east of the regional capital Katowice.

The gmina covers an area of 73.55 square kilometres (28.4 sq mi), and as of 2019 its total population is 2,623.

== Villages ==
Gmina Irządze contains the villages and settlements of Bodziejowice, Irządze, Mikołajewice, Sadowie, Wilgoszcza, Wilków, Witów, Woźniki, Wygiełzów, Zawada Pilicka and Zawadka.

== Neighbouring gminas ==
Gmina Irządze is bordered by the gminas of Kroczyce, Lelów, Niegowa and Szczekociny.
