= Najdziszów =

- Village
- Location within Poland
- Coordinates: 50°25′N 19°6′E
- Country: Poland
- Voivodeship: Silesian
- County: Będzin
- Gmina: Mierzęcice
- Population: 182

Najdziszów [nai̯ˈd͡ʑiʂuf] is a village in the administrative district of Gmina Mierzęcice, within Będzin County, Silesian Voivodeship, in southern Poland.
