= Gmina Kroczyce =

Gmina Kroczyce Kroczyce Commune
- Gmina
- Coat of arms
- Interactive map of Gmina Kroczyce
- Coordinates (Kroczyce): 50°33′49″N 19°34′14″E
- Country: Poland
- Voivodeship: Silesian
- County: Zawiercie
- Seat: Kroczyce

Area
  - Total: 110.15 km^{2} (42.53 sq mi)

Population (2019-06-30)
  - Total: 6,331
  - Density: 57.48/km^{2} (148.9/sq mi)
- Website: https://www.kroczyce.pl

Gmina Kroczyce is a rural gmina (administrative district) in Zawiercie County, Silesian Voivodeship, in southern Poland. Its seat is the village of Kroczyce, which lies approximately 13 kilometres (8 mi) north-east of Zawiercie and 54 km (34 mi) north-east of the regional capital Katowice.

The gmina covers an area of 110.15 square kilometres (42.5 sq mi), and its total population is 6,331 as of 2019.

== Villages ==
Gmina Kroczyce contains the villages and settlements of Biała Błotna, Browarek, Dobrogoszczyce, Dzibice, Gołuchowice, Huta Szklana, Kostkowice, Kroczyce Okupne, Kroczyce Stare, Lgota Murowana, Lgotka, Piaseczno, Podlesice, Pradła, Przyłubsko, Siamoszyce, Siedliszowice, Siemięrzyce, Szypowice and Trzciniec.

== Neighbouring gminas ==
Gmina Kroczyce is bordered by the town of Zawiercie and by the gminas of Irządze, Niegowa, Ogrodzieniec, Pilica, Szczekociny and Włodowice.
