= Gmina Włodowice =

Gmina Włodowice Włodowice Commune
- Gmina
- Coat of arms
- Interactive map of Gmina Włodowice
- Coordinates (Włodowice): 50°33′18″N 19°26′51″E
- Country: Poland
- Voivodeship: Silesian
- County: Zawiercie
- Seat: Włodowice

Area
  - Total: 76.29 km^{2} (29.46 sq mi)

Population (2019-06-30)
  - Total: 5,235
  - Density: 68.62/km^{2} (177.7/sq mi)
- Website: https://www.wlodowice.pl

Gmina Włodowice is a rural gmina (administrative district) in Zawiercie County, Silesian Voivodeship, in southern Poland. Its seat is the village of Włodowice, which lies approximately 7 kilometres (4 mi) north of Zawiercie and 47 km (29 mi) north-east of the regional capital Katowice.

The gmina covers an area of 76.29 square kilometres (29.5 sq mi), and as of 2019 its total population is 5,235.

== Villages ==
Gmina Włodowice contains the villages and settlements of Góra Włodowska, Hucisko, Kopaniny, Morsko, Parkoszowice, Rudniki, Rzędkowice, Skałka, Włodowice and Zdów.

== Neighbouring gminas ==
Gmina Włodowice is bordered by the towns of Myszków and Zawiercie, and by the gminas of Kroczyce, Niegowa and Żarki.

== Twin towns – sister cities ==
Gmina Włodowice is twinned with:

- Lamerdingen, Germany
- Oravský Podzámok, Slovakia
