= Sadowie, Zawiercie County =

Sadowie
- Village
- Location within Poland
- Coordinates: 50°37′57″N 19°38′43″E
- Country: Poland
- Voivodeship: Silesian
- County: Zawiercie
- Gmina: Irządze

Sadowie [saˈdɔvjɛ] is a village in the administrative district of Gmina Irządze, within Zawiercie County, Silesian Voivodeship, in southern Poland.
