= Gmina Ogrodzieniec =

Gmina Ogrodzieniec Ogrodzieniec Commune
- Gmina
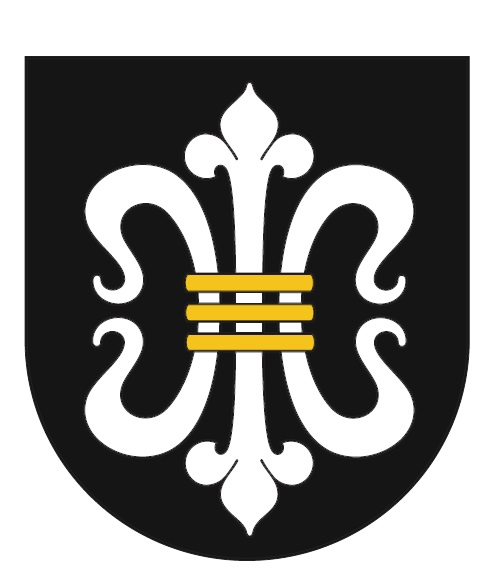
- Coat of arms
- Interactive map of Gmina Ogrodzieniec
- Coordinates (Ogrodzieniec): 50°27′N 19°31′E
- Country: Poland
- Voivodeship: Silesian
- County: Zawiercie
- Seat: Ogrodzieniec

Area
  - Total: 85.69 km^{2} (33.09 sq mi)

Population (2019-06-30)
  - Total: 9,105
  - Density: 106.3/km^{2} (275.2/sq mi)
  - Urban: 4,282
  - Rural: 4,823
- Website: https://www.ogrodzieniec.pl

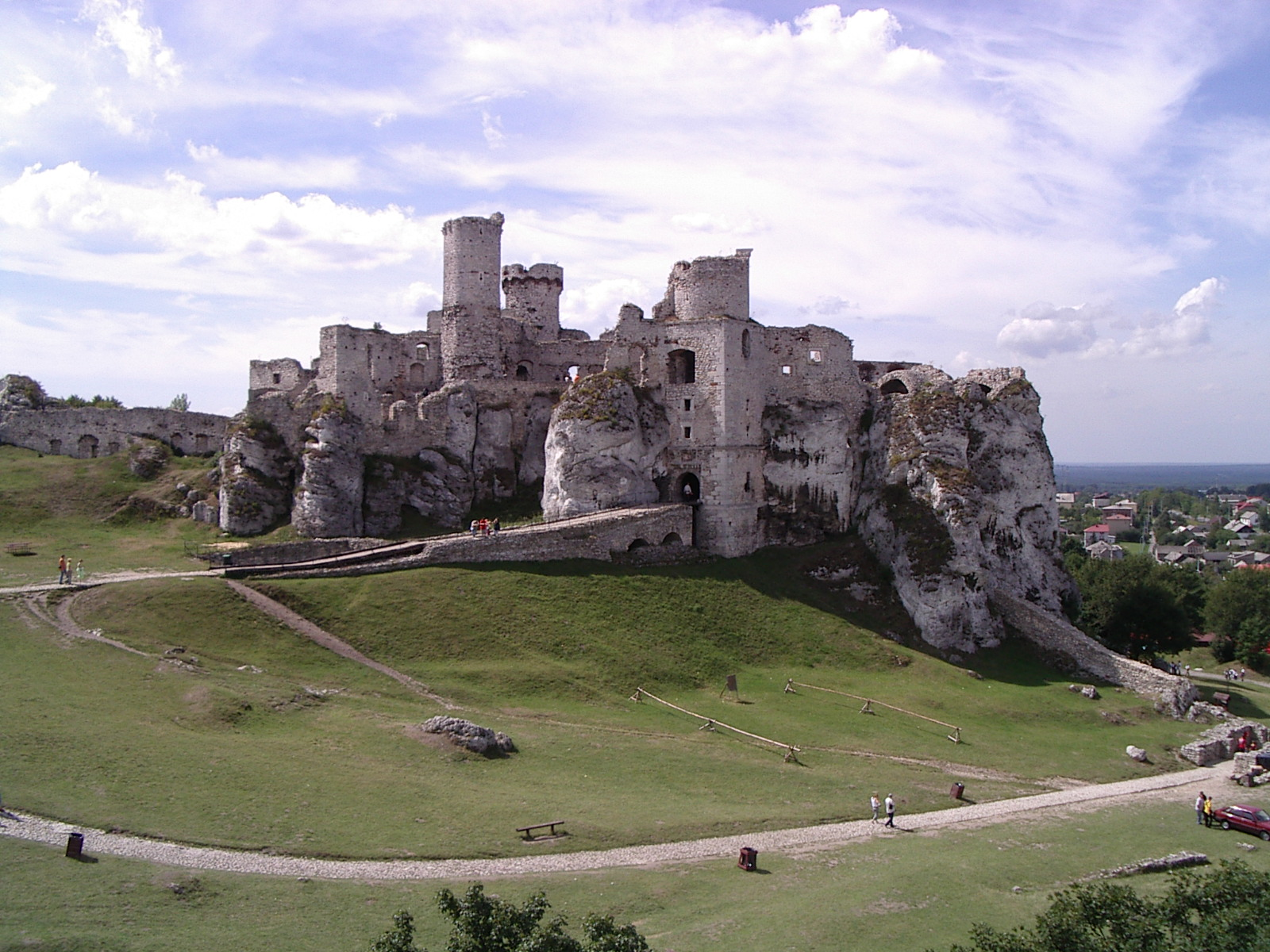
Ogrodzieniec Castle View

Gmina Ogrodzieniec is an urban-rural gmina (administrative district) in Zawiercie County, Silesian Voivodeship, in southern Poland. Its seat is the town of Ogrodzieniec, which lies approximately 9 kilometres (6 mi) south-east of Zawiercie and 43 km (27 mi) north-east of the regional capital Katowice.

The gmina covers an area of 85.69 square kilometres (33.1 sq mi), and as of 2019 its total population is 9,105.

The gmina contains part of the protected area called Eagle Nests Landscape Park.

== Villages ==
Apart from the town of Ogrodzieniec, Gmina Ogrodzieniec contains the villages and settlements of Fugasówka, Giebło, Giebło-Kolonia, Gulzów, Kiełkowice, Markowizna, Mokrus, Podzamcze, Ryczów, Ryczów-Kolonia, Śrubarnia and Żelazko.

== Neighbouring gminas ==
Gmina Ogrodzieniec is bordered by the town of Zawiercie and by the gminas of Klucze, Kroczyce, Łazy and Pilica.

== Twin towns – sister cities ==
Gmina Ogrodzieniec is twinned with:

- Bogács, Hungary
- Forbach, Germany
- Groß-Bieberau, Germany
- Melissano, Italy
- Spišské Podhradie, Slovakia
- Tuczno, Poland
