= Boguchwałowice =

- Village
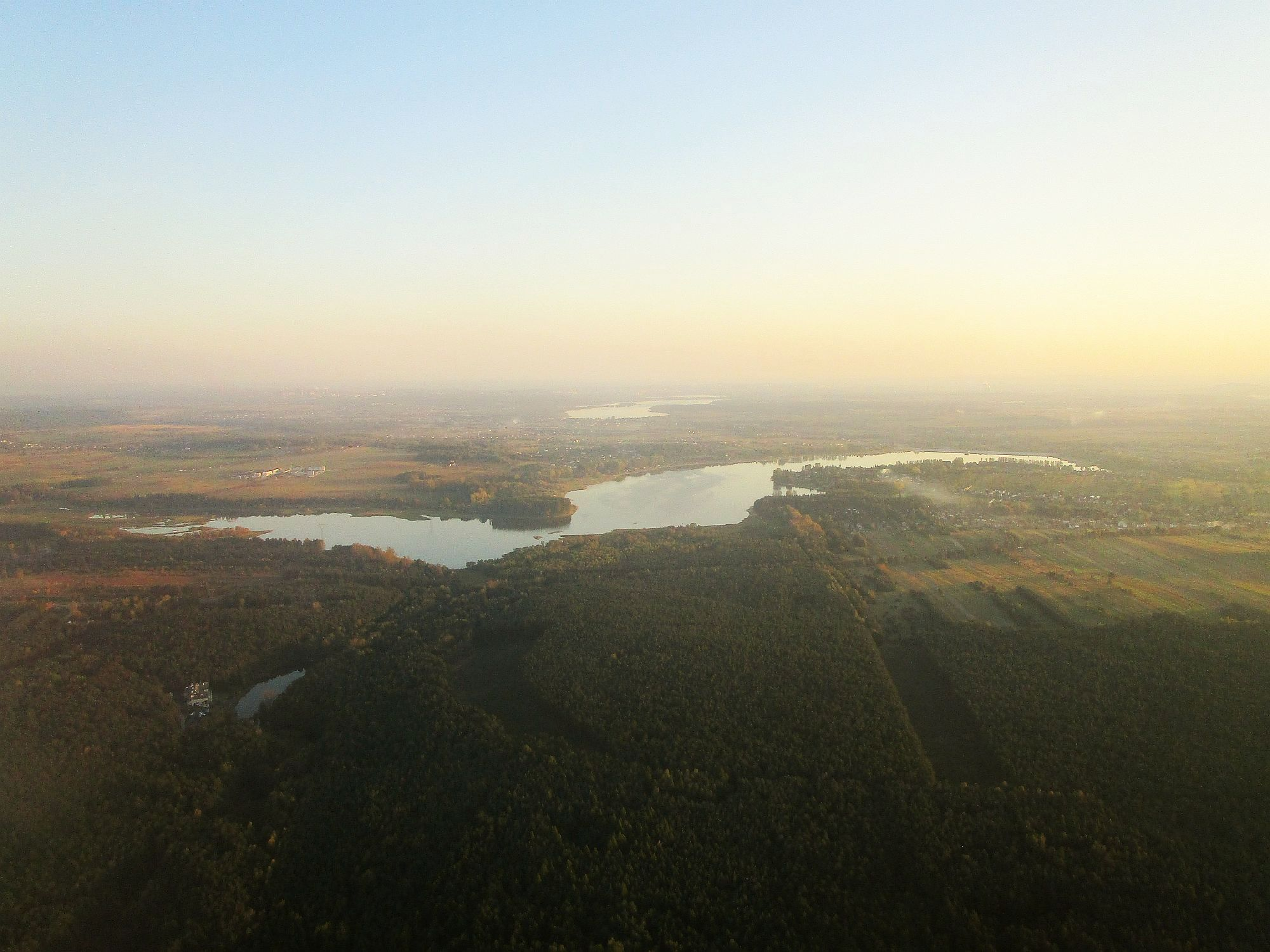

- Location within Poland
- Coordinates: 50°27′N 19°10′E
- Country: Poland
- Voivodeship: Silesian
- County: Będzin
- Gmina: Mierzęcice
- Population: 685

Boguchwałowice [bɔɡuxfawɔˈvʲit͡sɛ] is a village in the administrative district of Gmina Mierzęcice, within Będzin County, Silesian Voivodeship, in southern Poland.
