= Zawiercie County =

Zawiercie County Powiat zawierciański
- County
- Flag Coat of arms

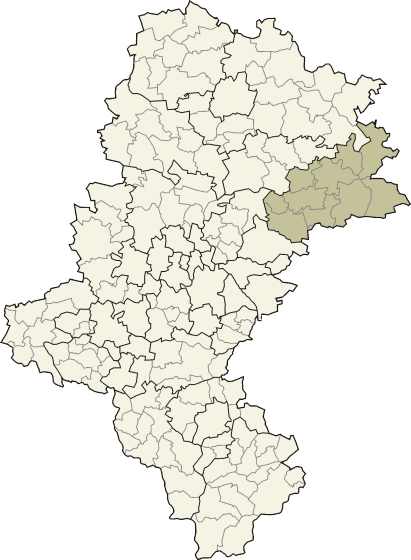
- Location within Silesian Voivodeship
- Coordinates (Zawiercie): 50°30′N 19°25′E
- Country: Poland
- Voivodeship: Silesian
- Seat: Zawiercie
- Gminas: Total 10 (incl. 2 urban): Poręba; Zawiercie; Gmina Irządze; Gmina Kroczyce; Gmina Łazy; Gmina Ogrodzieniec; Gmina Pilica; Gmina Szczekociny; Gmina Włodowice; Gmina Żarnowiec

Area
  - Total: 1,003.27 km^{2} (387.36 sq mi)

Population (2019-06-30)
  - Total: 118,020
  - Density: 117.64/km^{2} (304.67/sq mi)
  - Urban: 74,500
  - Rural: 43,520
- Car plates: SZA
- Website: www.zawiercie.powiat.pl

Zawiercie County (Polish: powiat zawierciański) is a unit of territorial administration and local government (powiat) in Silesian Voivodeship, southern Poland. It came into being on January 1, 1999, as a result of the Polish local government reforms passed in 1998. Its administrative seat and largest town is Zawiercie, which lies 41 kilometres (25 mi) north-east of the regional capital Katowice. The county contains five other towns: Poręba, 6 km (4 mi) west of Zawiercie, Łazy, 8 km (5 mi) south of Zawiercie, Ogrodzieniec, 9 km (6 mi) south-east of Zawiercie, Szczekociny, 33 km (21 mi) north-east of Zawiercie, and Pilica, 18 km (11 mi) east of Zawiercie.

The county covers an area of 1,003.27 square kilometres (387.4 sq mi). As of 2019 its total population was 118,020. The most populated towns are Zawiercie with 49,334 inhabitants and Poręba with 8,525 inhabitants.

== Neighbouring counties ==
Zawiercie County is bordered by Częstochowa County to the north, Włoszczowa County to the north-east, Jędrzejów County and Miechów County to the east, Olkusz County and the city of Dąbrowa Górnicza to the south, Będzin County to the south-west, and Myszków County to the west.

== Administrative divisions ==
The county is subdivided into 10 gminas (two urban, four urban-rural and four rural). These are listed in the following table, in descending order of population.

Gmina	Type	Area (km^{2})	Population (2019)	Seat
Zawiercie	urban	85.2	49,334	
Gmina Łazy	urban-rural	132.6	15,923	Łazy
Gmina Ogrodzieniec	urban-rural	85.7	9,105	Ogrodzieniec
Gmina Pilica	urban-rural	138.9	8,625	Pilica
Poręba	urban	40.0	8,525	
Gmina Szczekociny	urban-rural	136.1	7,692	Szczekociny
Gmina Kroczyce	rural	110.2	6,331	Kroczyce
Gmina Włodowice	rural	76.3	5,235	Włodowice
Gmina Żarnowiec	rural	124.8	4,627	Żarnowiec
Gmina Irządze	rural	73.6	2,623	Irządze
