= Tychy Grota-Roweckiego railway station =

Railway station in Tychy, Poland

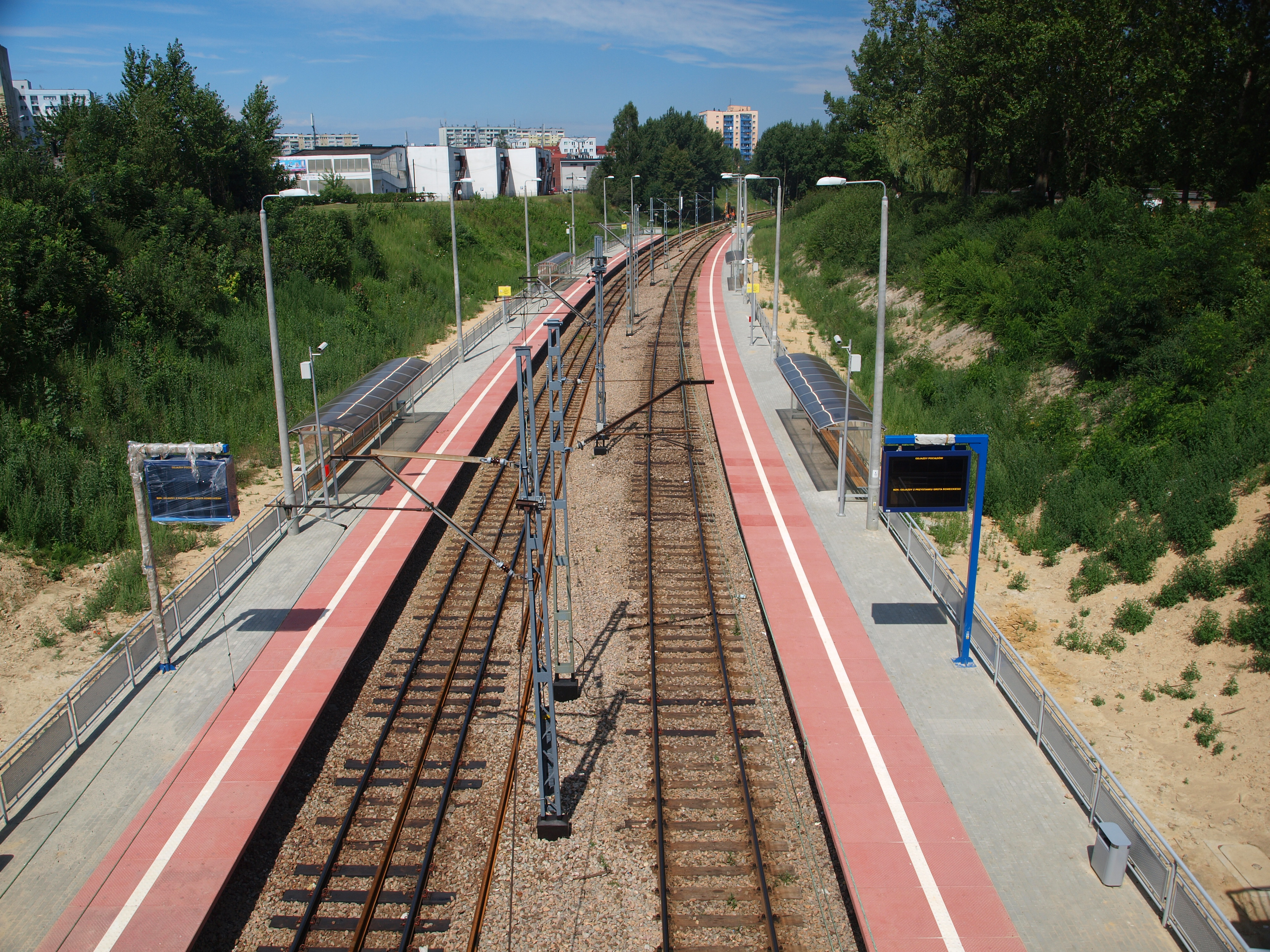

General information
- Location: Tychy, Silesian Voivodeship; Poland
- Coordinates: 50°06′49.118″N 18°59′13.250″E
- Operator: Silesian Railways
- Line: Tychy–Mysłowice Kosztowy MKSB1 railway
- Platforms: 2
- Tracks: 2

History
- Opened: 1 September 2012
Location
- Location within Poland

Tychy Grota-Roweckiego railway station is a located on the Szybka Kolej Regionalna in the Downtown district of Tychy, Poland, located under the viaduct along Stefan Grota-Rowecki Street. The station was established in 2012 as part of the expansion of the Szybka Kolej Regionalna network.

== Passenger traffic ==
Year	Daily passenger exchange
2017	200–299
2022	200–299

== History ==
On 15 February 2011, Tychy Public Transport Company signed a contract with Przedsiębiorstwo Robót Komunikacyjnych in Kraków for the construction of the Tychy Lodowisko, Tychy Aleja Bielska, and Tychy Grota-Roweckiego railway stations, as well as the modernization of the Tychy Zachodnie railway station. Initially, plans involved rebuilding the Tychy Miasto railway station, but constructing a new railway station was chosen as a more cost-effective solution.

All three stations opened on 1 September 2012. On the same day, Polregio extended its train services, previously terminating at Tychy Miasto, to Tychy Lodowisko. On 9 December 2012, Silesian Railways took over operations of the stop and the entire Szybka Kolej Regionalna network.

== Railways ==
The station is located on the double-track Tychy–Mysłowice Kosztowy MKSB1 railway. It features two single-edge platforms, each 200 meters long, positioned on the outer sides of the tracks.

== Infrastructure ==
The station is equipped with ticket machines, real-time passenger information displays, loudspeakers, surveillance cameras, lighting, shelters, and emergency communication poles.

== Train services ==
Tychy Grota-Roweckiego railway station is served by the Szybka Kolej Regionalna (Line S4 of Silesian Railways, running between Sosnowiec Główny and Tychy Lodowisko). Trains operate on an hourly schedule, with some services terminating or originating at Katowice.

== Connections ==
A bus and trolleybus stop, Tychy Gen Grota-Roweckiego, operated by the Metropolitan Transport Authority, is located nearby.
