= Rapid Regional Railway =

Commuter rail system in the Katowice urban area, Poland

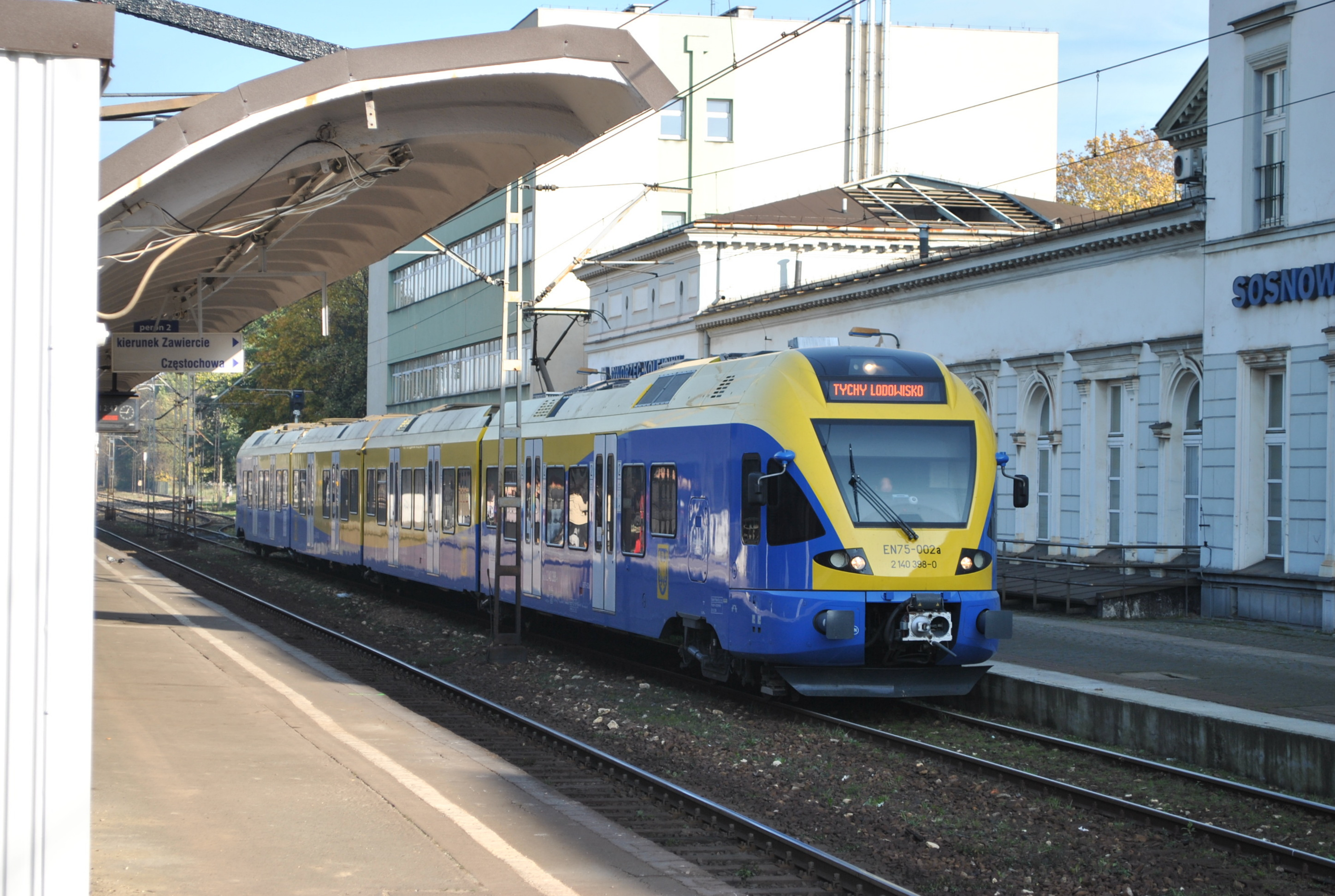
- EN75 at Sosnowiec Główny railway station

Overview
- Native name: Szybka Kolej Regionalna
- Locale: Tychy, Katowice, Sosnowiec, Poland
- Transit type: Commuter rail
- Number of lines: 1
- Number of stations: 13

Operation
- Began operation: 14 December 2008
- Operator: Silesian Railways

Technical
- System length: 28.995 km (18.017 mi)
- Track gauge: 1,435 mm (56.5 in)

The Rapid Regional Railway (Polish: Szybka Kolej Regionalna; SKR) is a commuter rail system operating since 14 December 2008 in the Katowice urban area, connecting Tychy with Sosnowiec via Katowice, operated by Silesian Railways.

== Route ==
The Rapid Regional Railway route spans 30.458 km. It utilizes Tychy–Mysłowice Kosztowy MKSB1 railway, Katowice–Zwardoń railway, and Warszawa Zachodnia–Katowice railway.

The route includes 13 stops, operates on an hourly clock-face schedule, and offers additional peak-hour services on the shorter Tychy Lodowisko to Katowice route.

Km	Name	City	District	Park & Ride	Connections
0.000	Sosnowiec Główny	Sosnowiec	Śródmieście	No	Tram, bus
3.366	Katowice Szopienice Południowe	Katowice	Szopienice-Burowiec	No	Bus
6.109	Katowice Zawodzie	Katowice	Zawodzie	No	
8.834	Katowice	Katowice	Śródmieście	No	Tram, bus
12.239	Katowice Brynów	Katowice	Załęska Hałda-Brynów	No	
14.549	Katowice Ligota	Katowice	Ligota-Panewniki	Yes	Bus
16.222	Katowice Piotrowice	Katowice	Piotrowice-Ochojec	No	Bus
19.952	Katowice Podlesie	Katowice	Podlesie	No	Bus
25.439	Tychy	Tychy	Stare Tychy	Yes	Trolleybus, bus
27.787	Tychy Zachodnie	Tychy	Śródmieście	No	Trolleybus, bus
28.292	Tychy Aleja Bielska	Tychy	Śródmieście	No	Bus
28.721	Tychy Grota-Roweckiego	Tychy	Śródmieście	No	Trolleybus, bus
29.989	Tychy Lodowisko	Tychy	Śródmieście	Yes	Trolleybus, bus

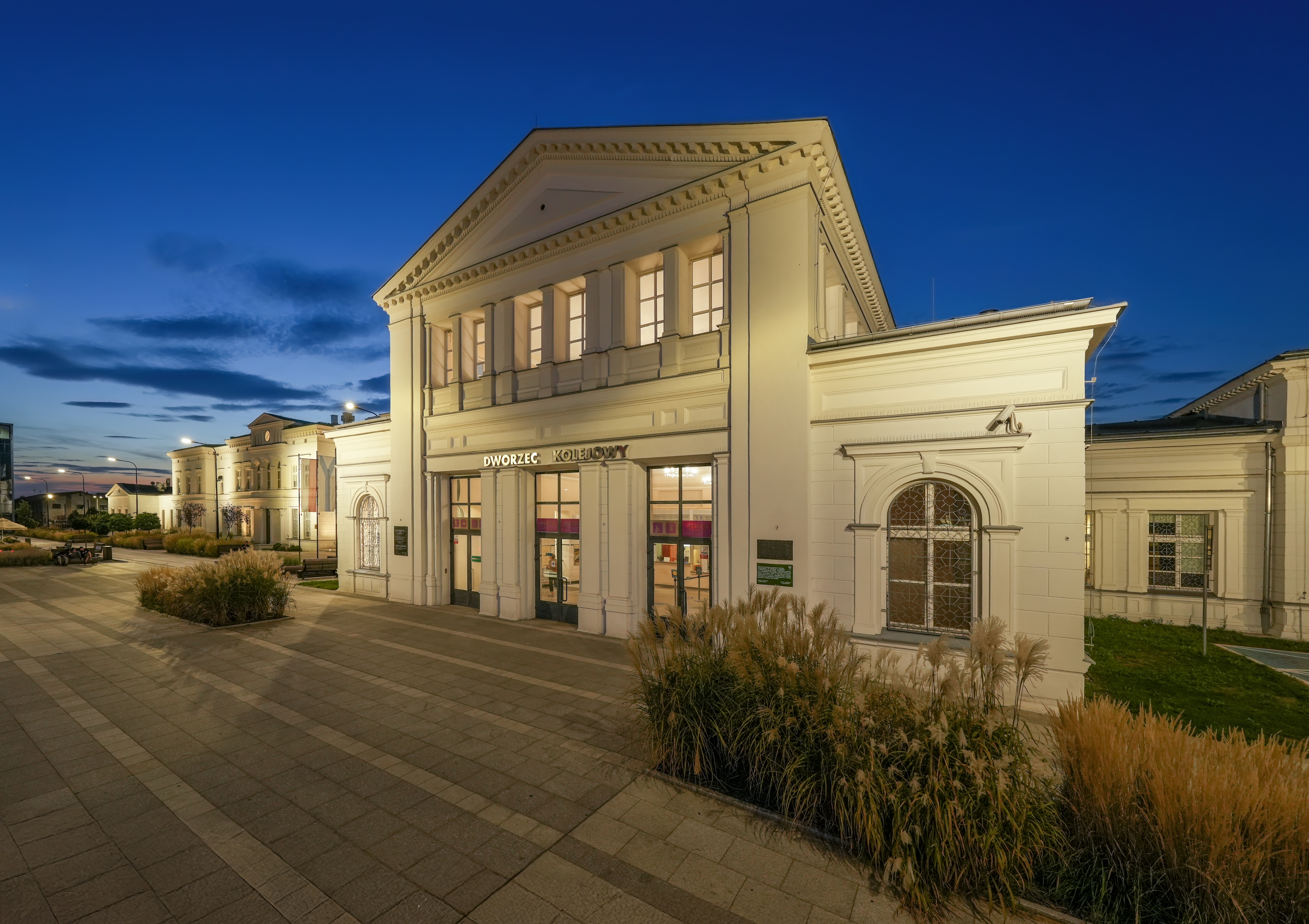
Sosnowiec Główny

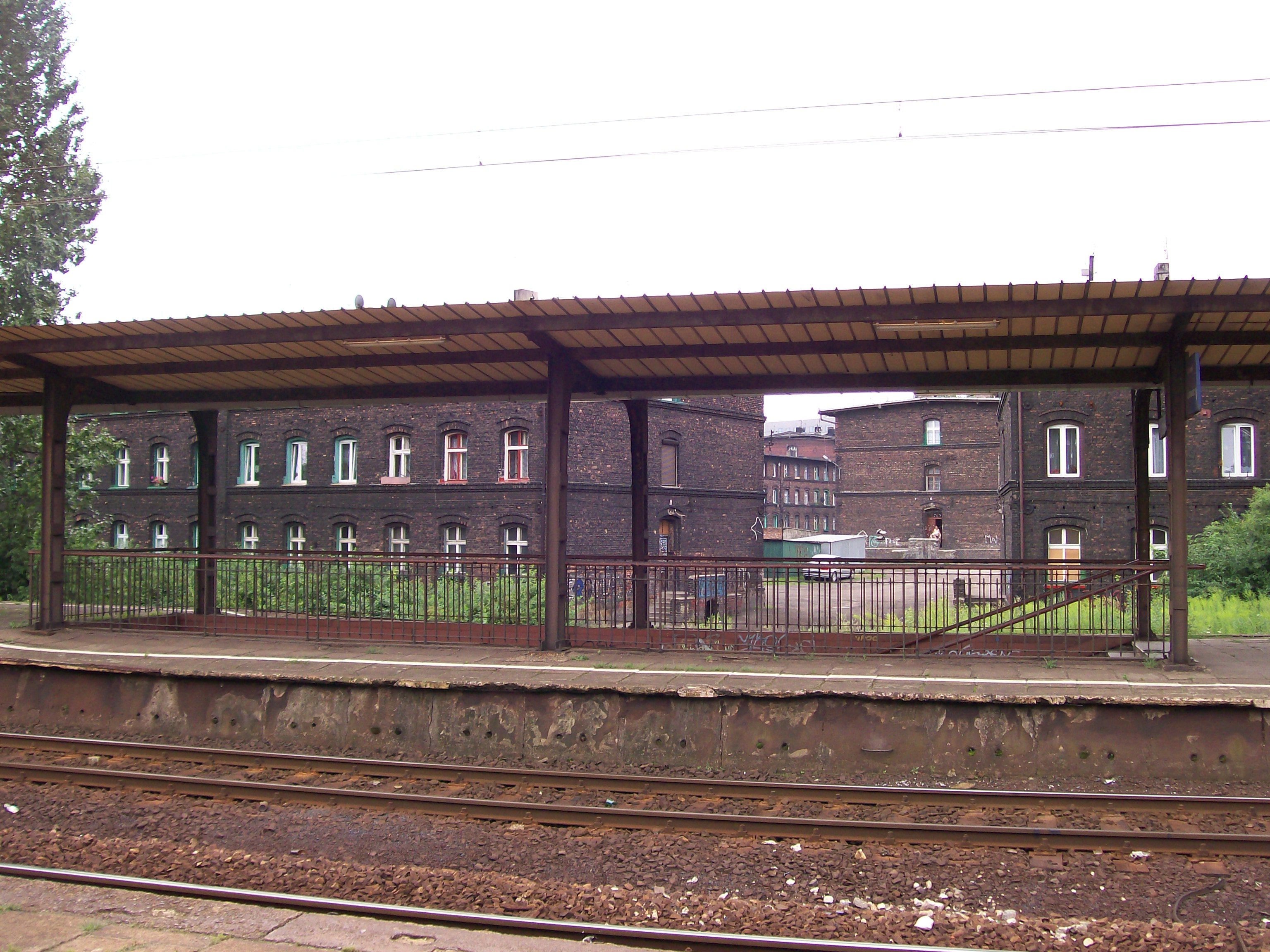
Katowice Szopienice Południowe

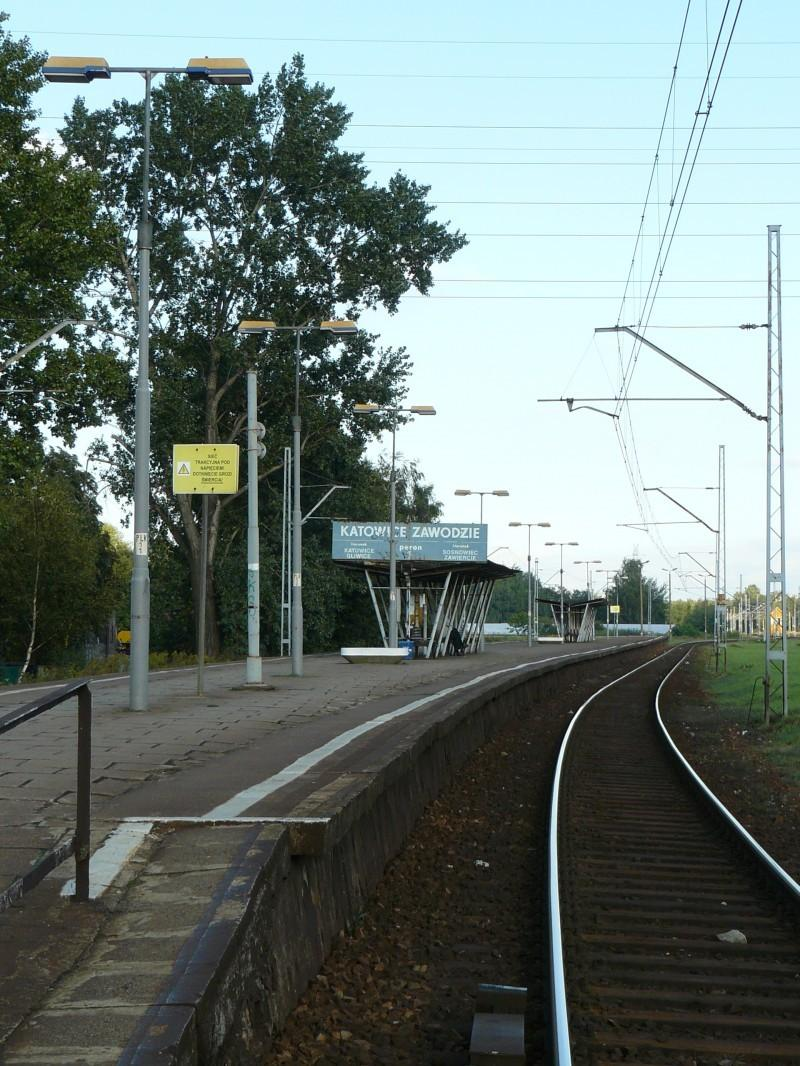
Katowice Zawodzie

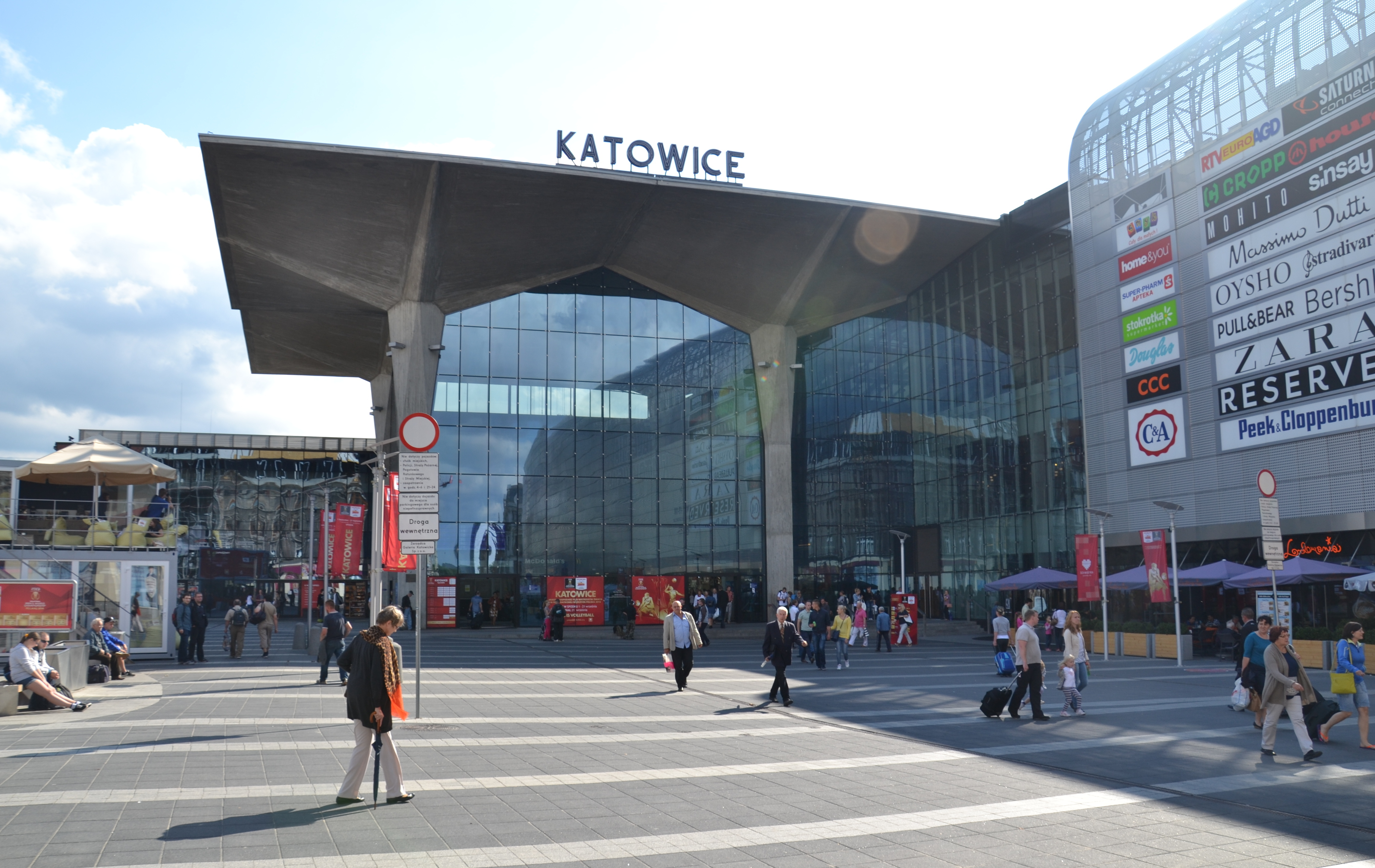
Katowice

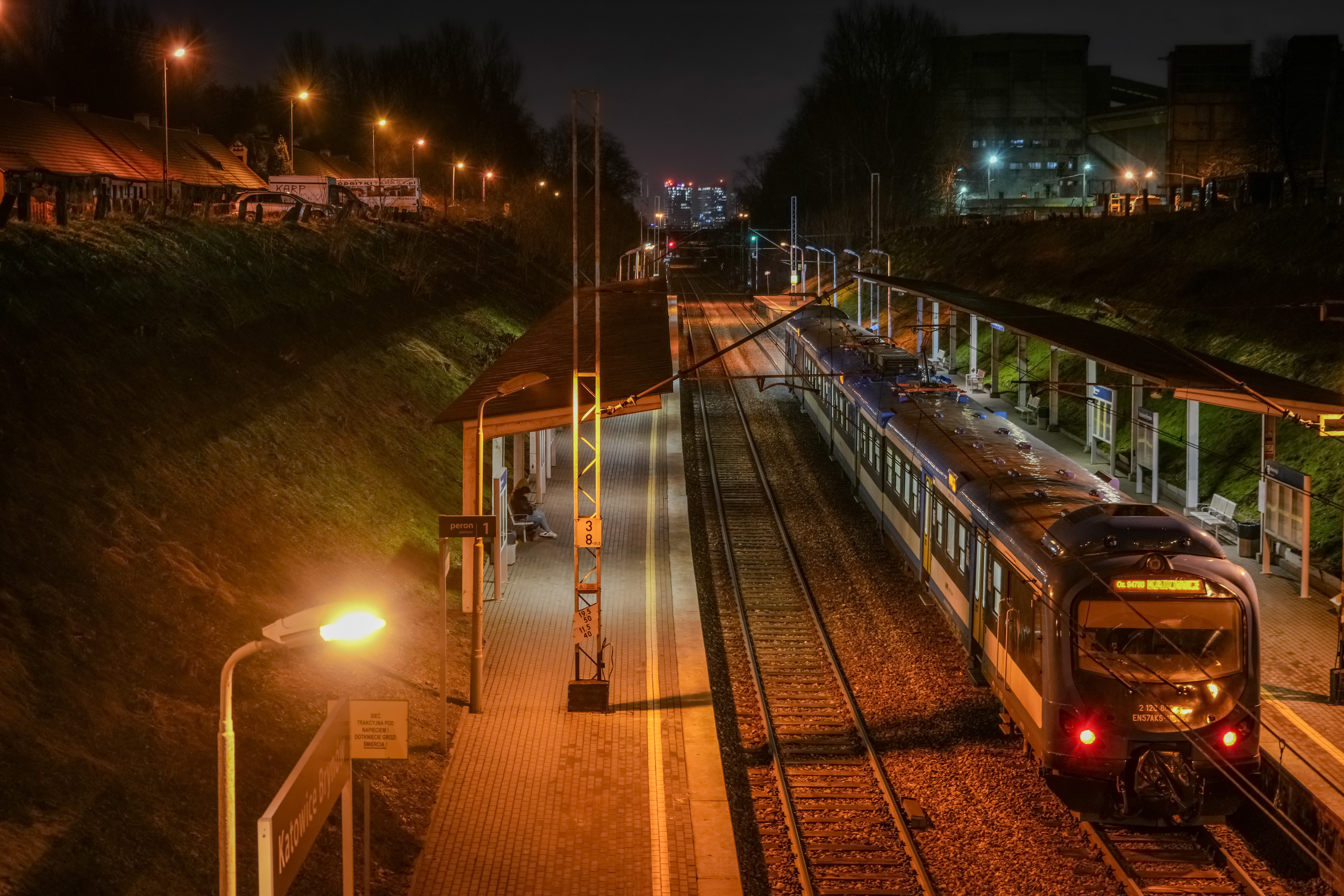
Katowice Brynów

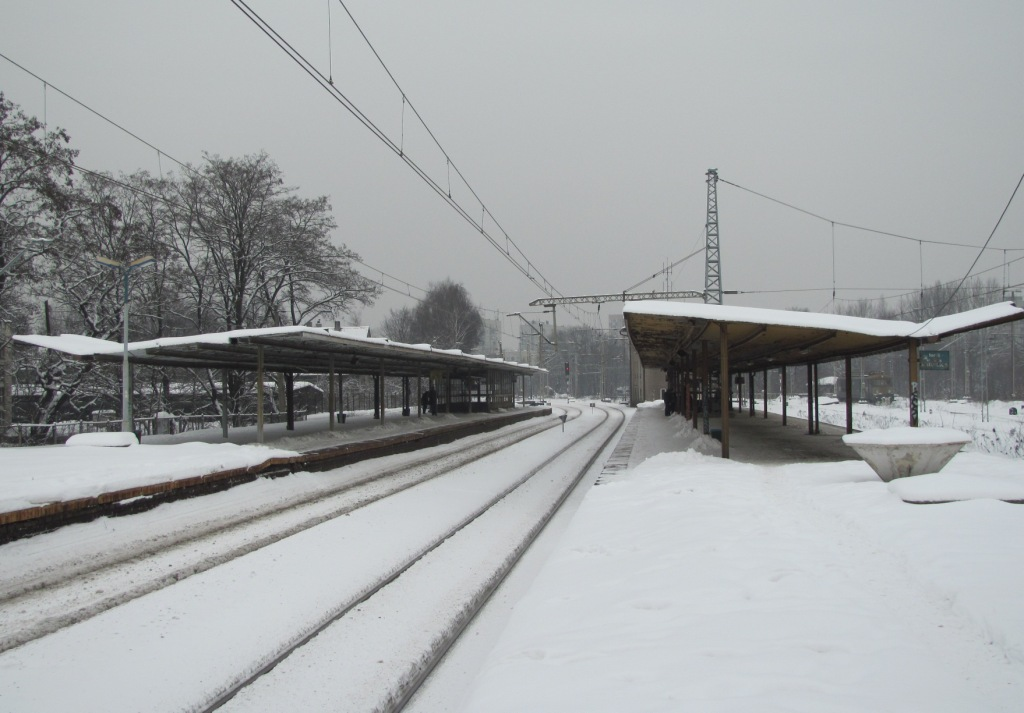
Katowice Ligota

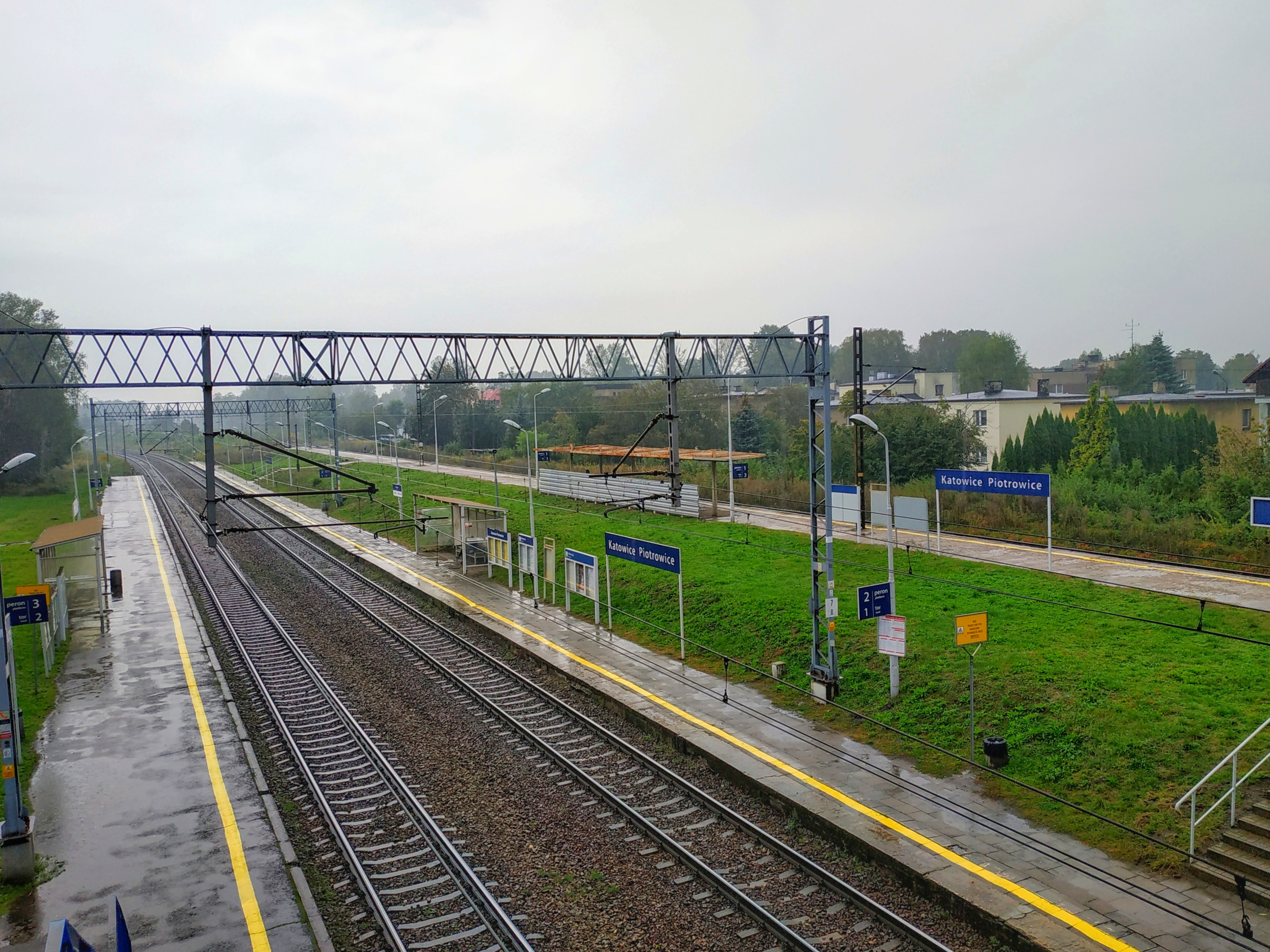
Katowice Piotrowice

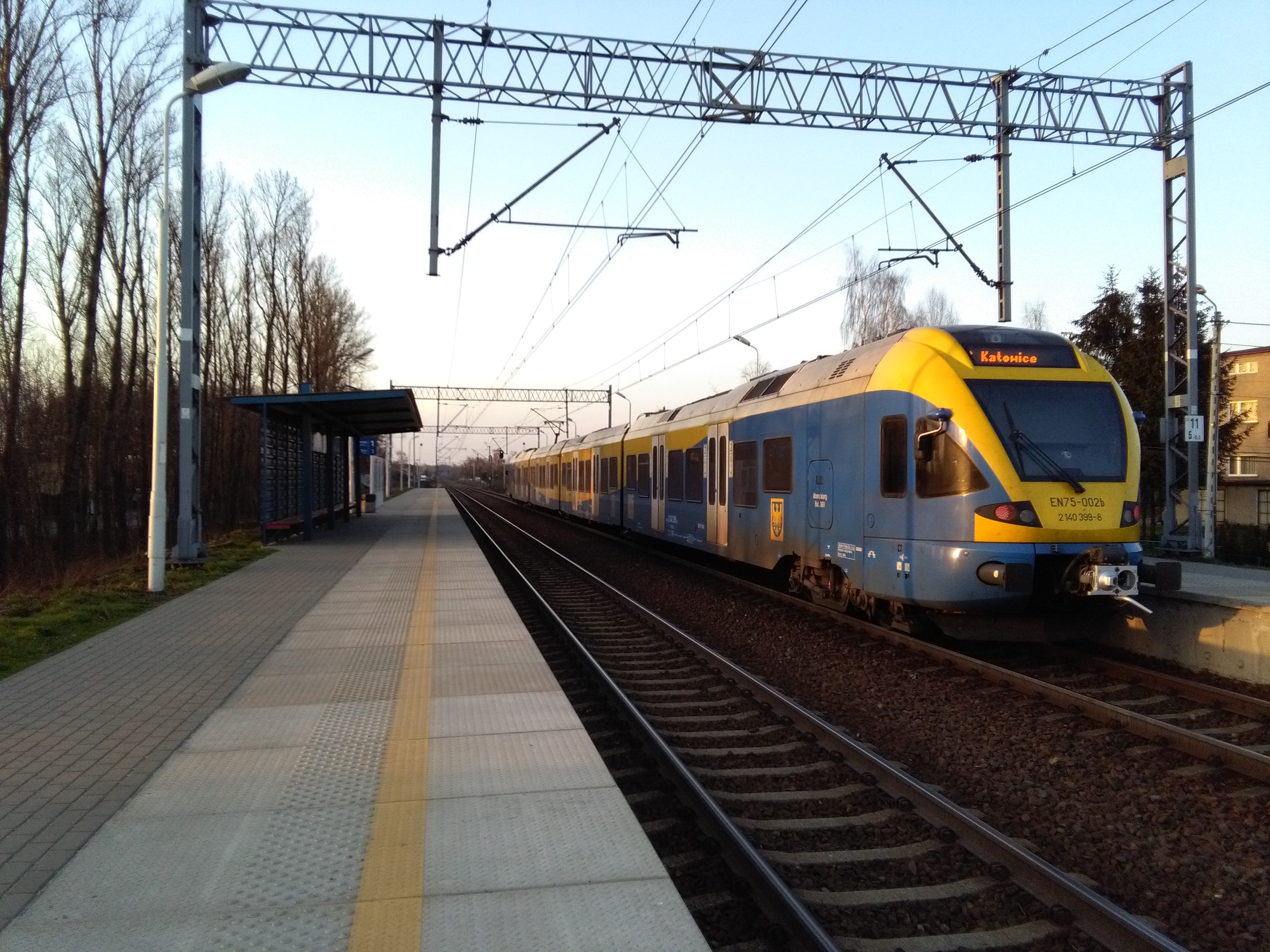
Katowice Podlesie

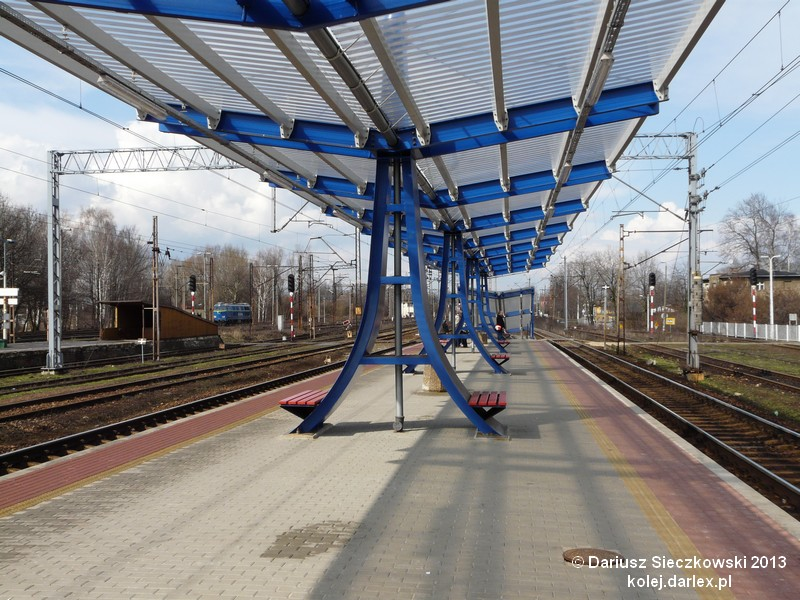
Tychy

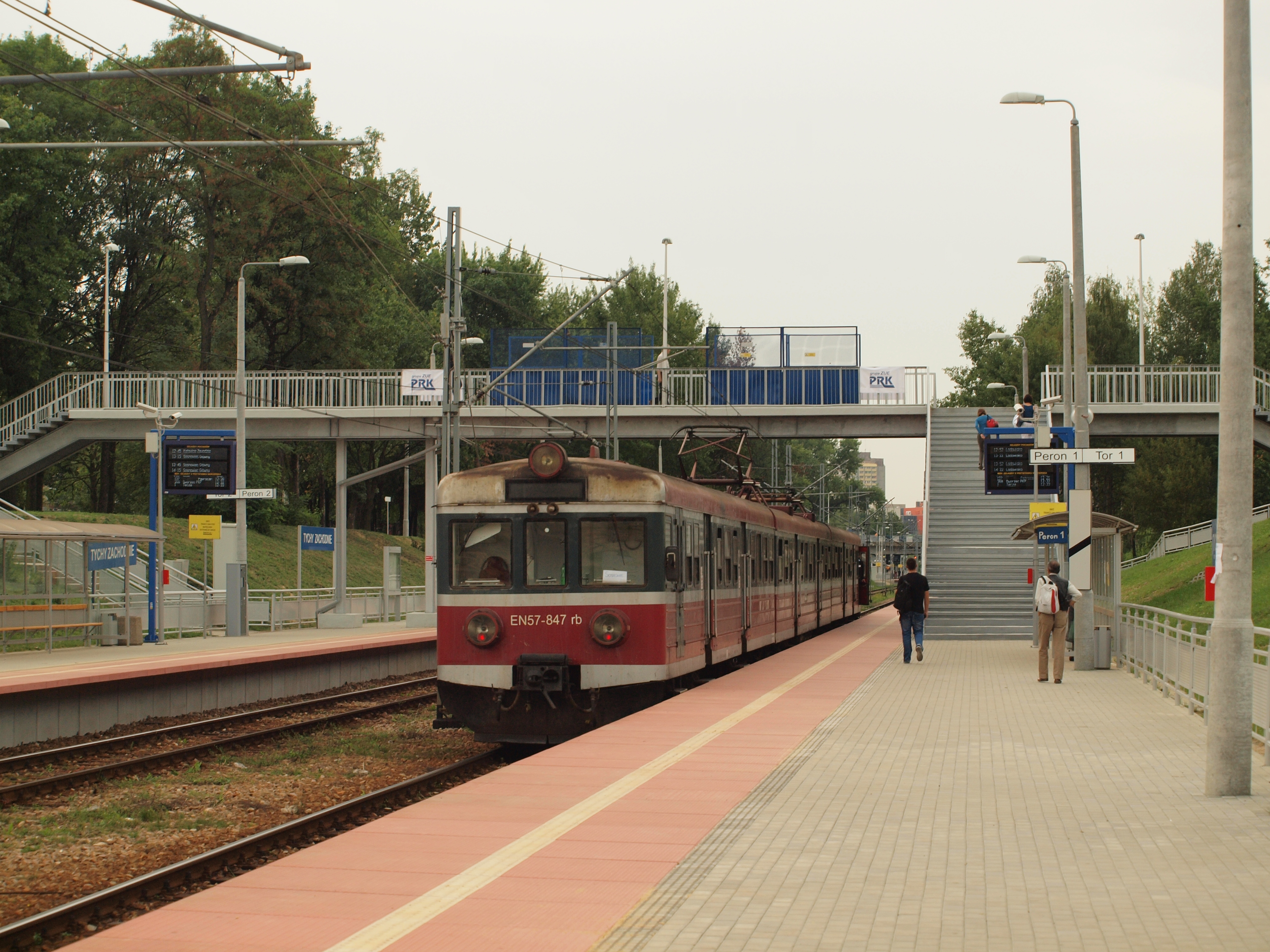
Tychy Zachodnie

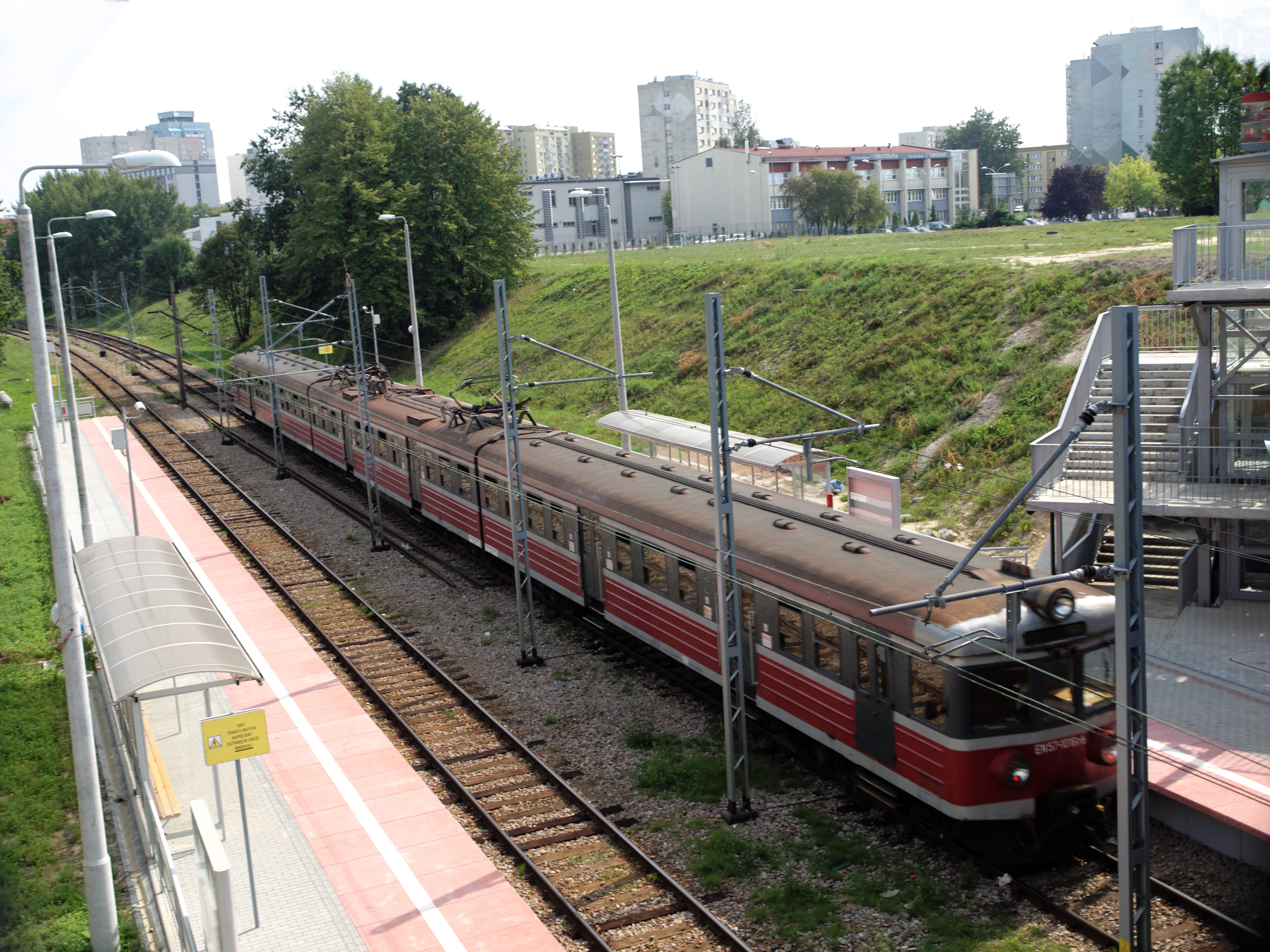
Tychy Aleja Bielska

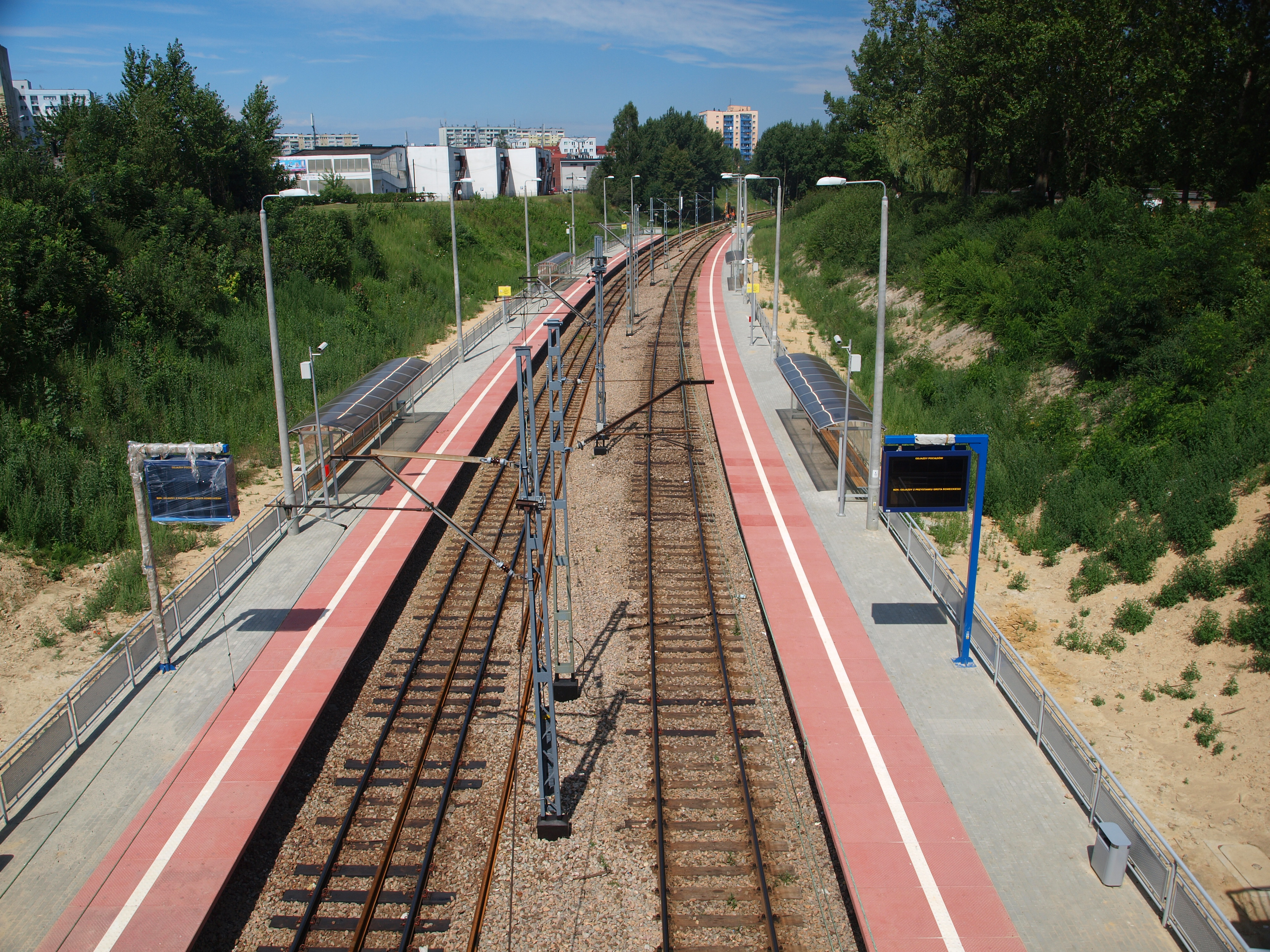
Tychy Grota-Roweckiego

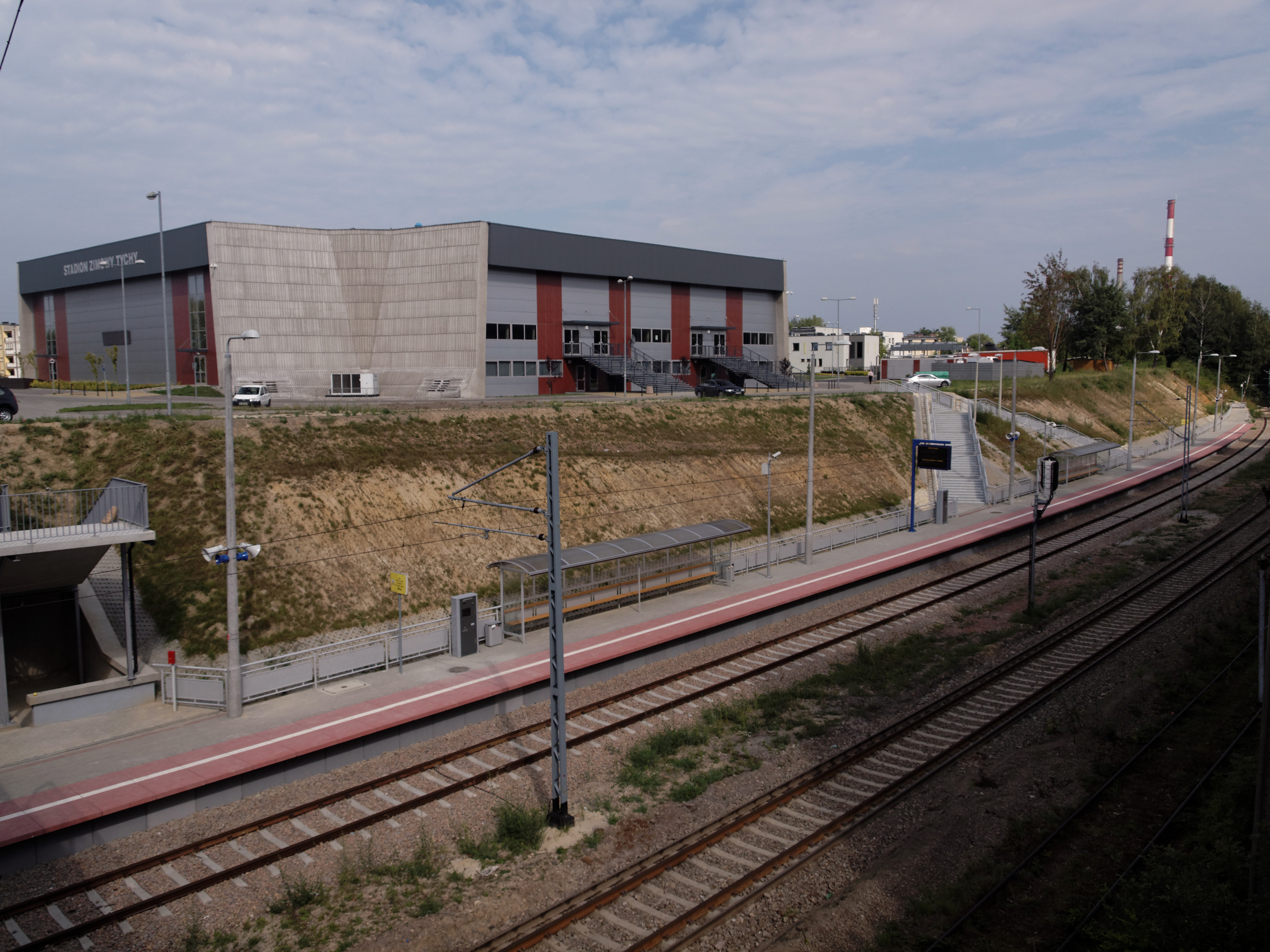
Tychy Lodowisko

== Tickets ==
In addition to the standard Silesian Railways fare, Rapid Regional Railway operates under the Orange Tariff. Orange Tariff tickets are valid on trains between Tychy Lodowisko and Katowice Szopienice Południowe, as well as on Metropolitan Transport Authority buses and trolleybuses, but only within the administrative boundaries of Tychy.

== History ==
=== Origins ===
In the 1990s, the rise of individual and bus transport led to a significant decline in passenger numbers on the Tychy to Tychy Miasto route. The route to Katowice via Katowice Murcki was circuitous, further reducing its appeal. Consequently, passenger services on the Tychy to Tychy Miasto line were suspended on 19 February 2001.

In 2005, the first plans of the Marshal's Office of the Silesian Voivodeship and the Tychy City Office appeared regarding the creation of a rapid urban rail system connecting Tychy, Katowice, and Sosnowiec. On 27 July 2006, the Silesian Voivodeship signed an agreement with Stadler Rail for the delivery of four 4-car FLIRTs to serve Rapid Regional Railway.

=== Operations ===
On 14 December 2008, Rapid Regional Railway commenced operations between Tychy Miasto and Katowice, serviced by newly acquired FLIRT trains.

From 13 December 2009, FLIRT trains also partially served the route from Częstochowa to Katowice route.

On 18 August 2010, a FLIRT EN75-003 train derailed near Niezapominajek Street in Katowice, tilting onto an embankment, injuring five people and sustaining significant damage. The damaged train was sent to Switzerland for repairs. On 12 December 2010, Rapid Regional Railway route was extended to Sosnowiec.

In early 2011, the voivodeship authorities decided to reassign all FLIRT trains to the Gliwice to Częstochowa route. On 15 February 2011, Tychy Municipal Transport Company signed a contract with the Transport Construction Enterprise in Kraków to construct the Tychy Aleja Bielska, Tychy Grota-Roweckiego, and Tychy Lodowisko railway stations and modernize Tychy Zachodnie. In August 2011, a strike by Przewozy Regionalne employees led the voivodeship to temporarily abandon plans to transfer Rapid Regional Railway operations to Silesian Railways. On 1 October 2011, FLIRT trains previously used by the Silesian branch of Przewozy Regionalne, including those on Rapid Regional Railway, were transferred to the newly launched Silesian Railways.

On 22 March 2012, PKP Polskie Linie Kolejowe signed a contract with a consortium of Unitor B and KZA Katowice to revitalize Tychy–Mysłowice Kosztowy MKSB1 railway between Tychy and Górki-Ściernie, excluding stops, which were covered by a separate contract signed the previous year. On 1 September 2012, three new stops – Tychy Aleja Bielska, Tychy Grota-Roweckiego, and Tychy Lodowisko – were opened, and the route was extended to Tychy Lodowisko. That same day, some bus services to Katowice operated by the Tychy Municipal Transport Company were discontinued. From 12 to 14 October 2012, a strike by Silesian branch of Przewozy Regionalne train drivers led to the cancellation of most services, which were replaced by Silesian Railways trains, marking their debut on Rapid Regional Railway route. For several days afterward, the line was operated by Silesian Railways drivers using Przewozy Regionalne rolling stock. On 9 December 2012, Silesian Railways fully took over Rapid Regional Railway operations, and the Tychy Miasto railway station was reinstated. On 18 December 2012, Tychy authorities signed a contract with Aldesa Construcciones to build two Park & Ride parking facilities, each for 352 cars, at the Tychy Lodowisko and Tychy railway stations.

On 1 June 2013, Silesian Railways implemented a recovery plan, reducing train services by half. In September 2013, construction began on a bus and trolleybus transfer hub at the Tychy railway station. On 15 December 2013, operations at Tychy Miasto railway station were discontinued again.

In January 2015, a Park & Ride parking facility opened at the Tychy railway station. In July 2015, another Park & Ride facility opened at Tychy Lodowisko.

== Awards and recognition ==
- On 25 June 2012, the Transport Construction Enterprise in Kraków received the Third Degree Award in the 2012 Construction of the Year competition for constructing four Tychy Rapid Regional Railway stations.
