= Tychy Lodowisko railway station =

Railway station in Tychy, Poland

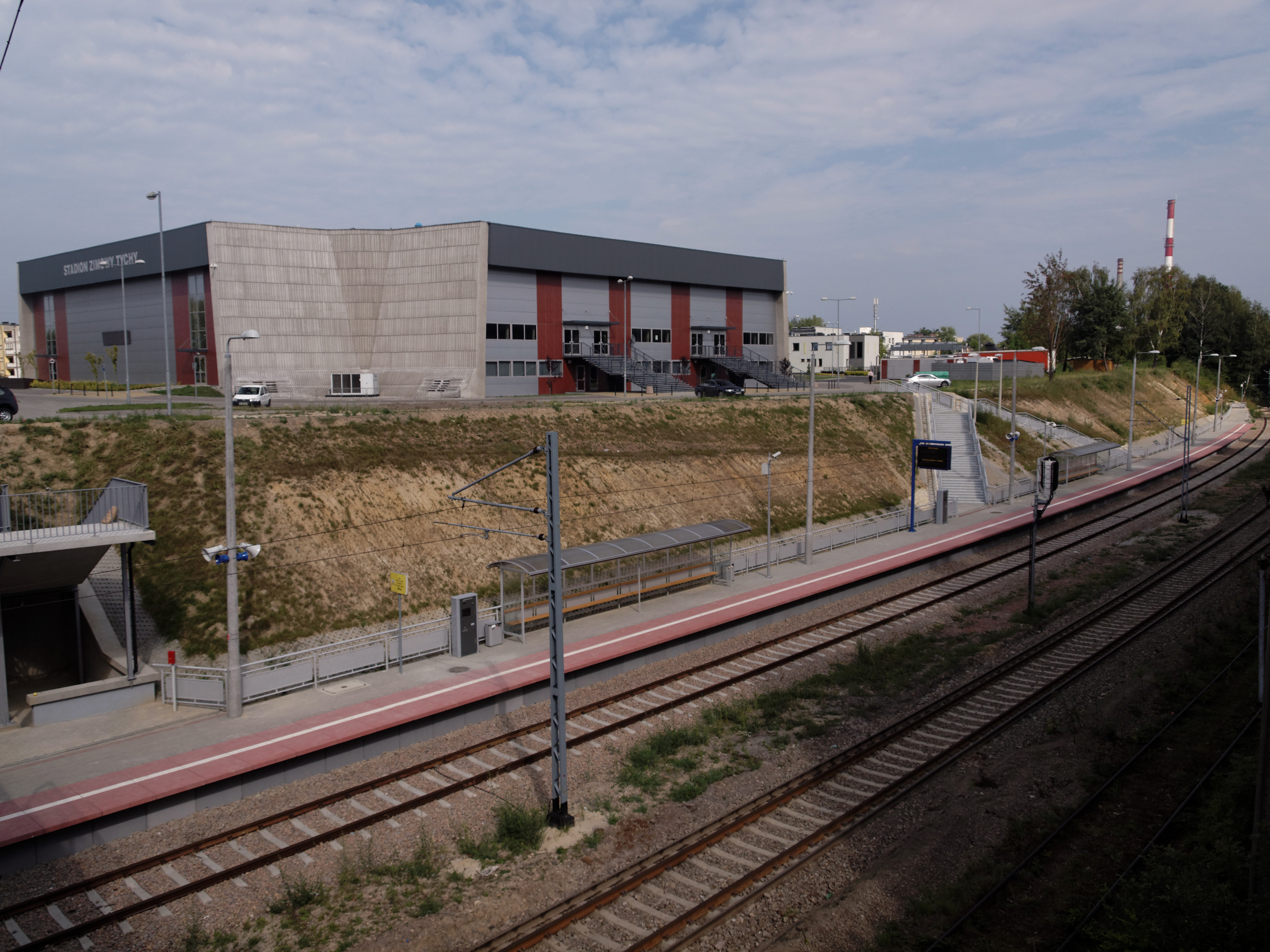

General information
- Location: Tychy, Silesian Voivodeship; Poland
- Coordinates: 50°06′28.310″N 18°59′59.795″E
- Operator: PKP Polskie Linie Kolejowe
- Line: Tychy Miasto–Tychy Lodowisko railway
- Platforms: 1

History
- Opened: 1 September 2012
Location
- Location within Poland

Tychy Lodowisko is a terminal railway station of the Szybka Kolej Regionalna in Downtown, Tychy, located under the viaduct along Stefan Wyszyński Street. The Winter Stadium is adjacent to the station. It was established in 2012 as part of the expansion of Szybka Kolej Regionalna.

== Passenger traffic ==
Year	Daily passenger traffic
2017	600–799
2022	1,000–1,500

== History ==
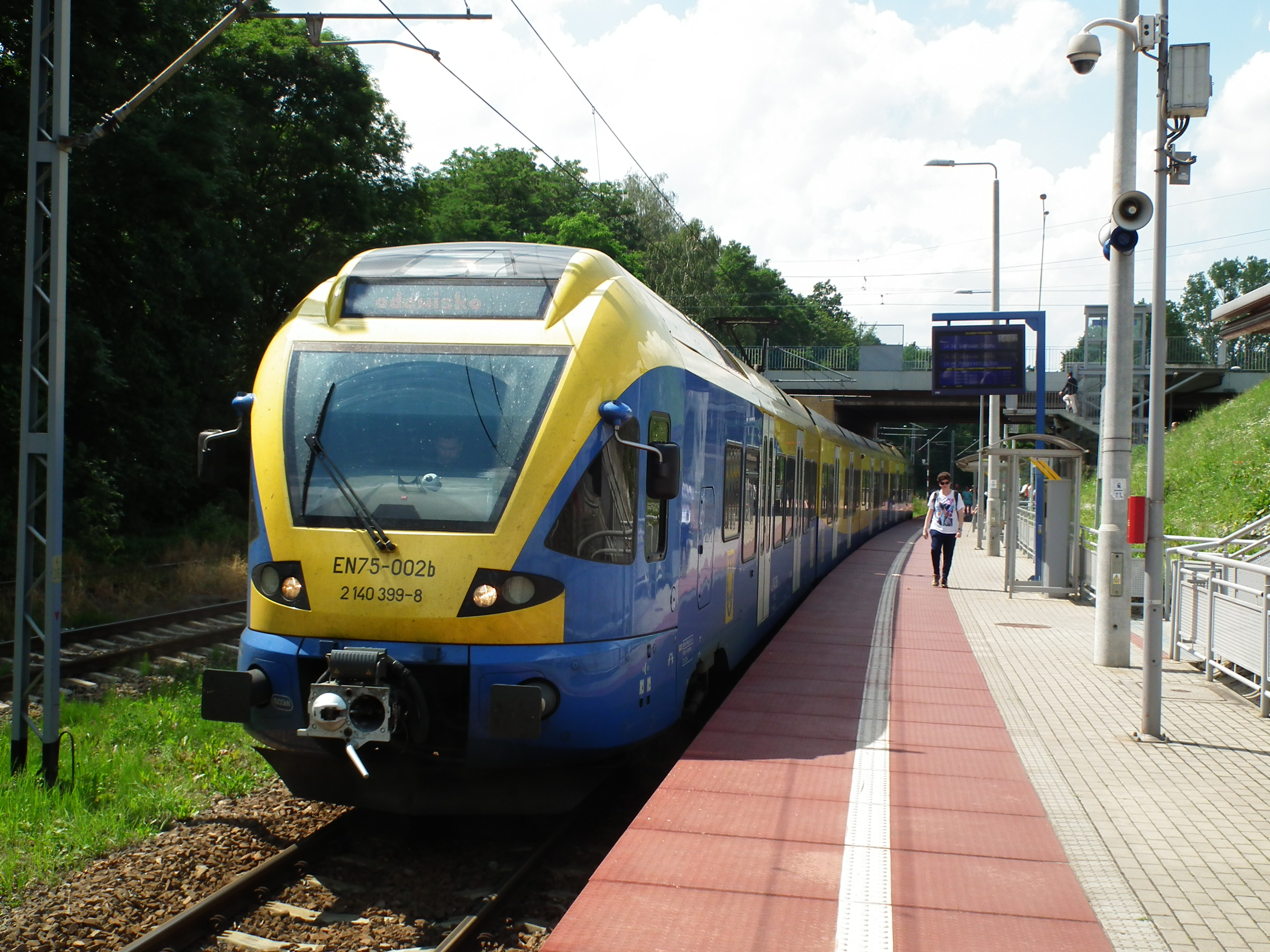
EN75-002 from Katowice

On 15 February 2011, Tychy Public Transport Company signed a contract with Przedsiębiorstwo Robót Komunikacyjnych for the construction of the Tychy Lodowisko, Tychy Aleja Bielska, and Tychy Grota-Roweckiego stations, as well as the modernization of the Tychy Zachodnie railway station.

All these stations were opened on 1 September 2012. On the same day, Polregio extended the routes of their trains, previously terminating at Tychy Miasto railway station, to Tychy Lodowisko. On 9 December 2012, the operation of the station, along with the entire Szybka Kolej Regionalna, was taken over by Silesian Railways. On 18 December 2012, Tychy authorities signed a contract with Aldesa Construcciones for the construction of two park and ride facilities (each with 352 parking spaces) at the Tychy Lodowisko railway station and Tychy railway station. The parking facility was opened on 29 June 2015.

== Railways ==
The station is located on Tychy Miasto–Tychy Lodowisko railway, running parallel to Tychy–Mysłowice Kosztowy MKSB1 railway. A buffer stop is located beyond the station toward Mysłowice Kosztowy railway station.

== Infrastructure ==
The station features a single 220-meter platform, equipped with ticket machines, dynamic passenger information, megaphones, CCTV, lighting, shelters, and emergency communication poles.

Adjacent to the station is a four-level park and ride facility accommodating 352 cars and 50 bicycles. An 18-meter tunnel connects the parking directly to the platform.

== Train services ==
The station is the terminus of Szybka Kolej Regionalna (line S4 of Silesian Railways, Sosnowiec Główny – Tychy Lodowisko). The line operates on a one-hour clock-face schedule. Some services terminate or originate in Katowice.

In 2021, the station handled between 1,000 and 1,500 passengers daily.

== Connectivity ==
Near the Tychy Lodowisko railway station are the bus and trolleybus stations Tychy Lodowisko and Tychy Osiedle O, served by Metropolitan Transport Authority, and a city bike-sharing station.
