= Tychy Aleja Bielska railway station =

Railway station in Tychy, Poland

Tychy Aleja Bielska
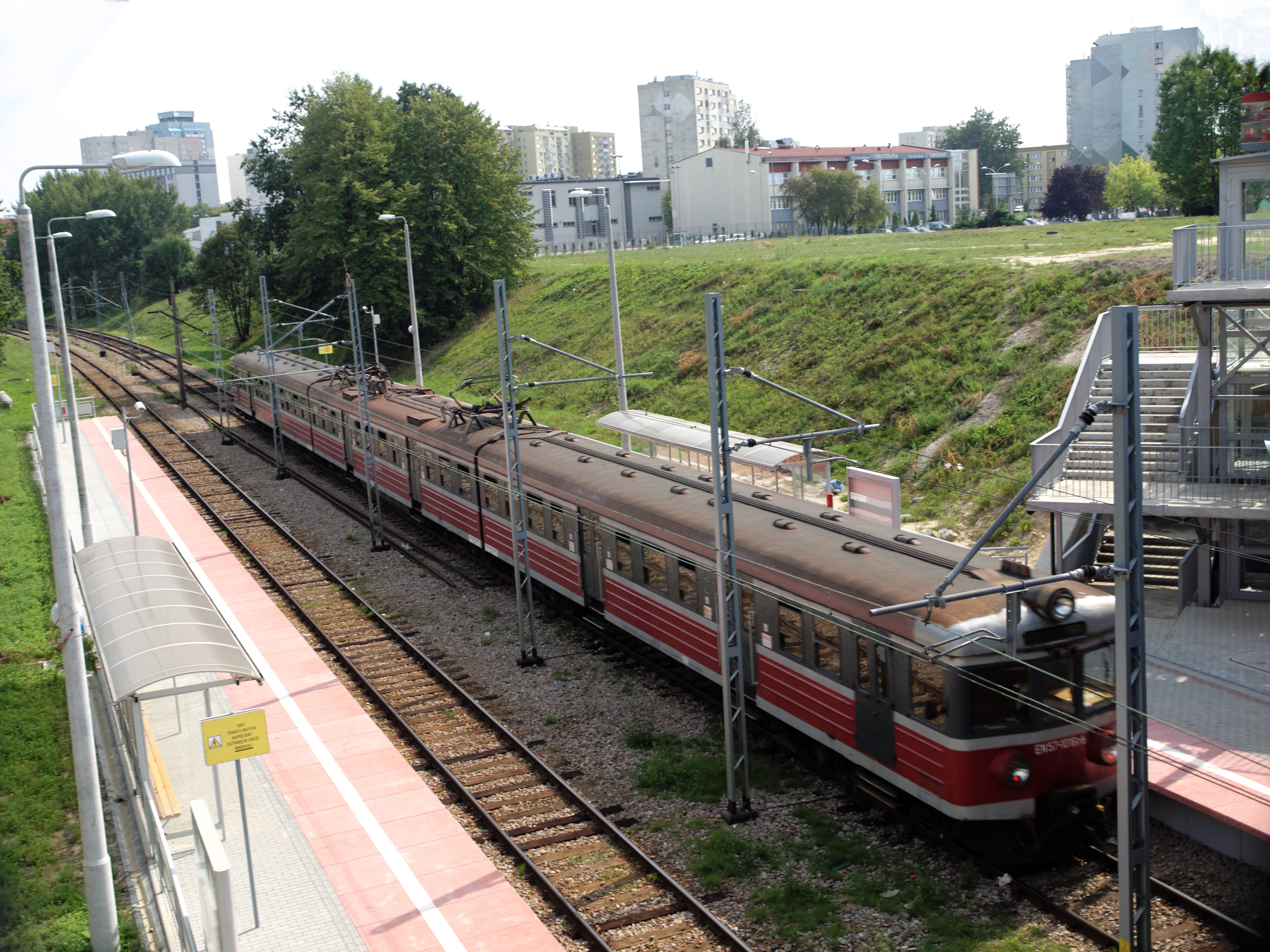
- EN57 train at the railway station

General information
- Location: Tychy; Poland
- Coordinates: 50°07′01.736″N 18°58′57.108″E
- System: railway station
- Line: Tychy–Mysłowice Kosztowy MKSB1 railway
- Platforms: 2
- Tracks: 2

History
- Opened: 1 September 2012
Location
- Location within Poland

Tychy Aleja Bielska is a railway station of the Szybka Kolej Regionalna located in the Śródmieście district of Tychy, Poland, beneath the viaduct along Bielska Avenue. The station was established in 2012 as part of the expansion of the Szybka Kolej Regionalna network.

== Passenger traffic ==
Year	Daily passenger volume
2017	100–149
2022	500–699

== History ==
On 15 February 2011, Municipal Transport Company in Tychy signed a contract with Transport Works Enterprise in Kraków for the construction of the Tychy Lodowisko, Tychy Aleja Bielska, and Tychy Grota-Roweckiego railway stations, as well as the modernization of the Tychy Zachodnie railway station.

All three railway stations opened on 1 September 2012. On the same day, Polregio extended its train services, previously terminating at Tychy Miasto railway station, to Tychy Lodowisko railway station. On 9 December 2012, operations of the station and the entire Szybka Kolej Regionalna network were transferred to Silesian Railways.

== Railways ==
The station is situated on the double-track Tychy–Mysłowice Kosztowy MKSB1 railway. It features two single-edge platforms, each 200 metres long, positioned on the outer sides of the tracks.

== Infrastructure ==
The station is equipped with ticket machines, dynamic passenger information displays, loudspeakers, CCTV, lighting, shelters, and emergency communication poles.

== Train services ==
Tychy Aleja Bielska serves the Szybka Kolej Regionalna (line S4 of Silesian Railways, connecting Sosnowiec Główny to Tychy Lodowisko). Trains operate on an hourly timetable, with some services terminating or originating in Katowice.

== Connections ==
Nearby bus stops, Tychy Bielska Szpital and Tychy Bielska Wiadukt, are served by the Metropolitan Transport Authority.
