= Gmina Bobrowniki =

Gmina Bobrowniki may refer to either of the following rural administrative districts in Poland:

- Gmina Bobrowniki, Silesian Voivodeship
- Gmina Bobrowniki, Kuyavian-Pomeranian Voivodeship
