= Myszkowice, Silesian Voivodeship =

Myszkowice
- Village
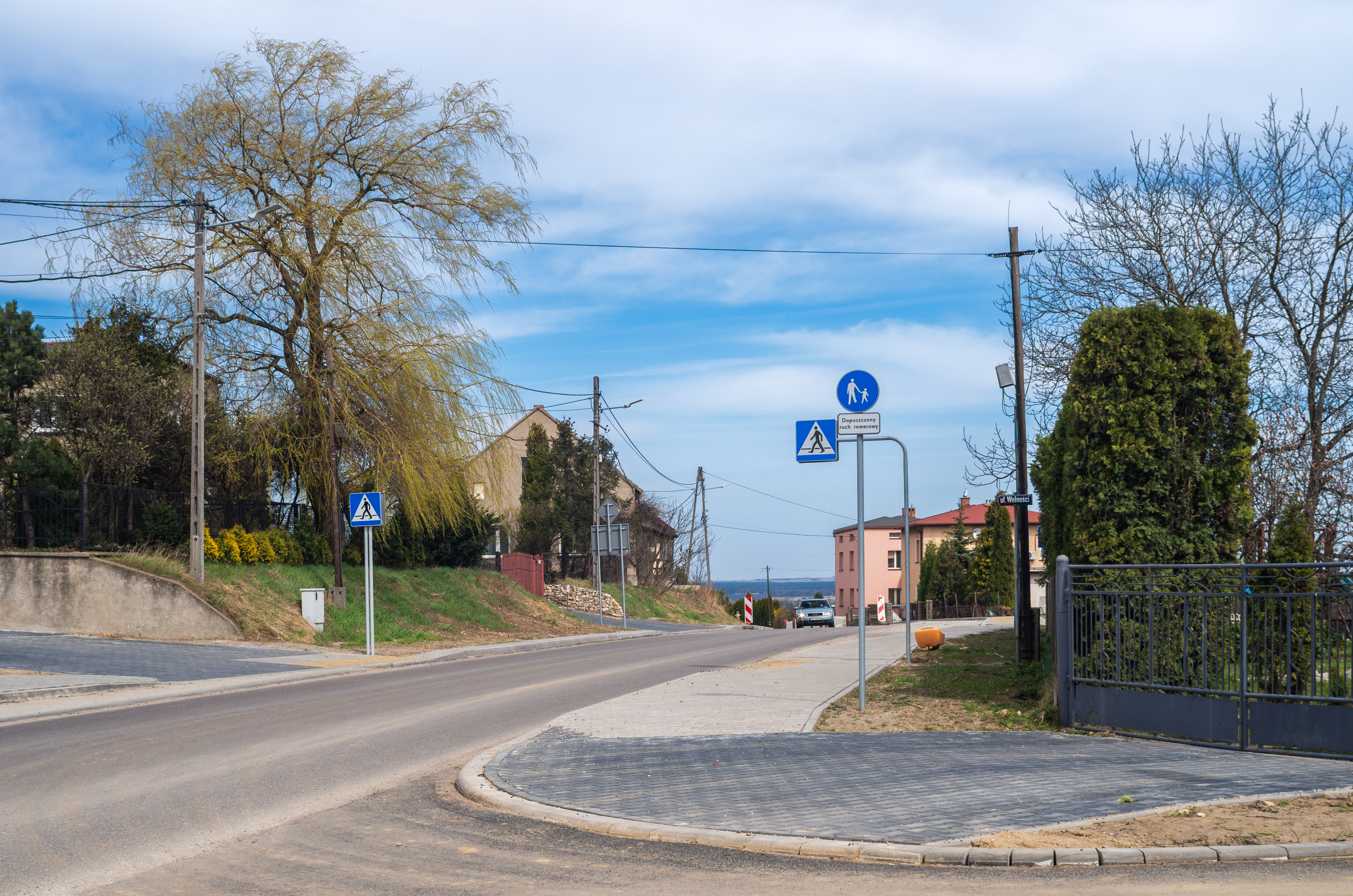

- Location within Poland
- Coordinates: 50°26′11″N 19°3′38″E
- Country: Poland
- Voivodeship: Silesian
- County: Będzin
- Gmina: Bobrowniki
- Population: 384

Myszkowice [mɨʂkɔˈvʲit͡sɛ] is a village in the administrative district of Gmina Bobrowniki, within Będzin County, Silesian Voivodeship, in southern Poland.
