= Twardowice =

- Village
- Location within Poland
- Coordinates: 50°25′N 19°5′E
- Country: Poland
- Voivodeship: Silesian
- County: Będzin
- Gmina: Bobrowniki
- Population: 381

Twardowice [tfardɔˈvʲit͡sɛ] is a village in the administrative district of Gmina Bobrowniki, within Będzin County, Silesian Voivodeship, in southern Poland.
