= Metropolitan Transport Authority =

Public transport authority in Metropolis GZM, Poland

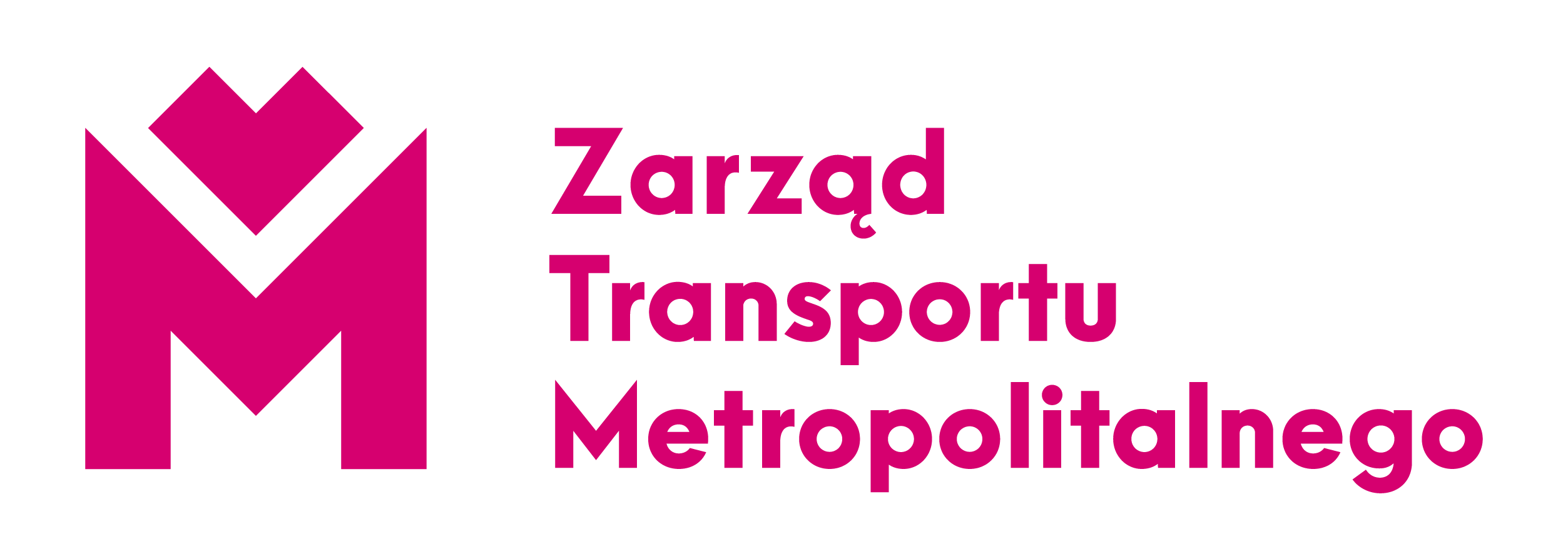

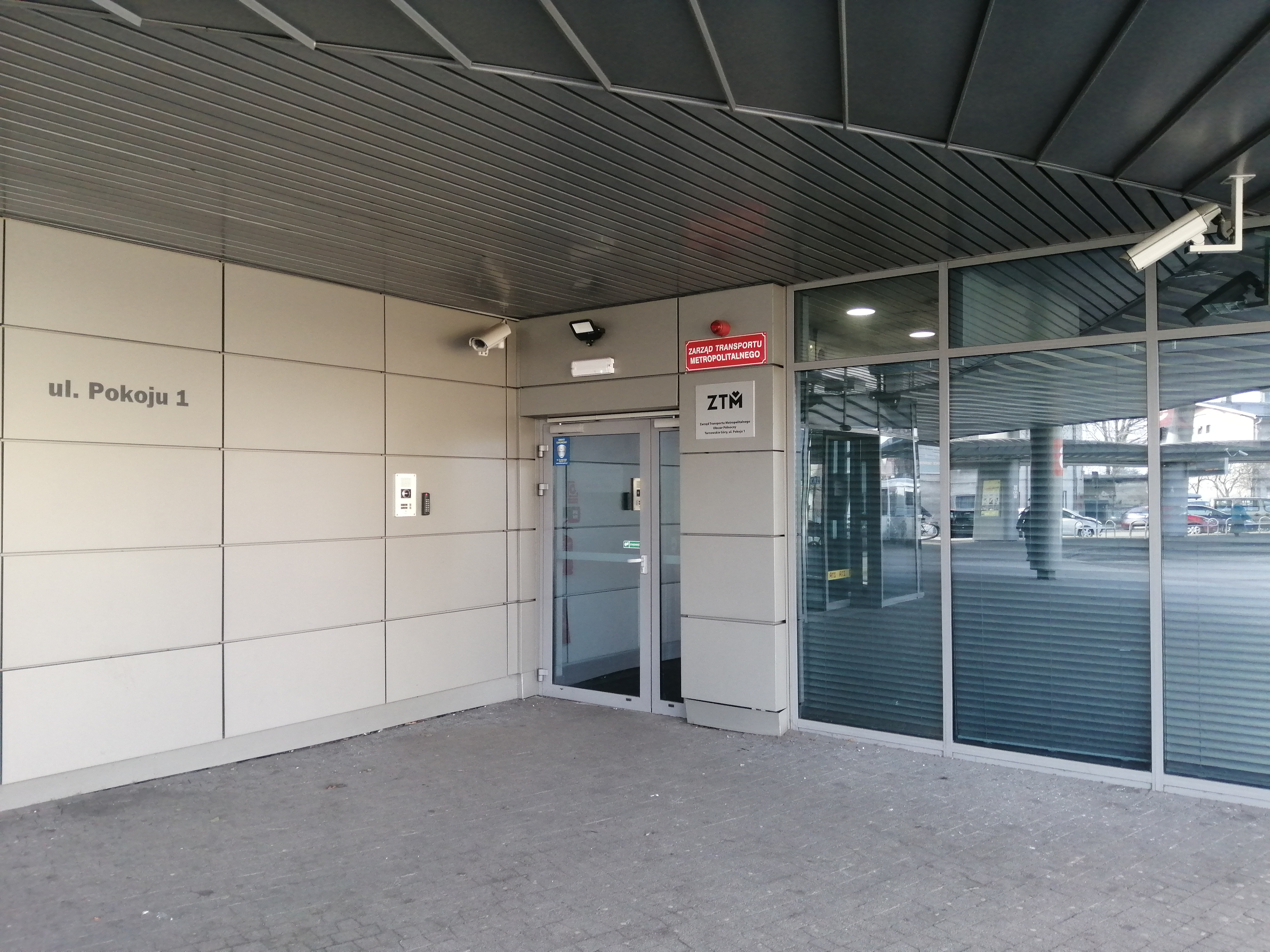
- Metropolitan Transport Authority – Northern Area in Tarnowskie Góry
- Native name: Zarząd Transportu Metropolitalnego
- Type: Municipal budgetary unit
- Founded: 22 November 2017
- Headquarters: Katowice, Poland
- Key people: Małgorzata Gutowska (director)
- Website: www.metropoliaztm.pl

Metropolitan Transport Authority (Polish: Zarząd Transportu Metropolitalnego, ZTM) is a municipal unit of Metropolis GZM, established on 22 November 2017 to organize, manage, and supervise local public transport across the cities of the metropolitan union, municipalities with signed agreements, and neighboring municipalities (a total of 57 cities and municipalities). It is the largest public transport authority in Poland by area.

== History ==
Metropolitan Transport Authority was established on 22 November 2017 by the GZM Assembly through resolution No. III/16/2017. On the same day, resolution No. III/17/2017 granted it a statute. On 1 January 2019, Metropolitan Transport Authority assumed the responsibilities of the previous transport authorities in the region: Municipal Transport Union of the Upper Silesian Industrial District, Intermunicipal Passenger Transport Union in Tarnowskie Góry, and Municipal Transport Authority in Tychy.

In January 2019, Małgorzata Gutowska was appointed director of Metropolitan Transport Authority.

== Area ==
Metropolitan Transport Authority provides services across the following 57 cities and municipalities:

- Będzin
- Bieruń
- Bobrowniki
- Bojszowy
- Bytom
- Chełm Śląski
- Chorzów
- Czeladź
- Czerwionka-Leszczyny
- Dąbrowa Górnicza
- Gierałtowice
- Gliwice
- Imielin
- Jaworzno
- Katowice
- Knurów
- Kobiór
- Koziegłowy
- Krupski Młyn
- Lędziny
- Łaziska Górne
- Łazy
- Miasteczko Śląskie
- Miedźna
- Mierzęcice
- Mikołów
- Mysłowice
- Myszków
- Ornontowice
- Orzesze
- Oświęcim
- Ożarowice
- Piekary Śląskie
- Pilchowice
- Psary
- Pszczyna
- Pyskowice
- Radzionków
- Ruda Śląska
- Rudziniec
- Siemianowice Śląskie
- Siewierz
- Sławków
- Sosnowiec
- Sośnicowice
- Świerklaniec
- Świętochłowice
- Tarnowskie Góry
- Toszek
- Tworóg
- Tychy
- Wielowieś
- Wojkowice
- Wyry
- Zabrze
- Zbrosławice
- Żory

Metropolitan Transport Authority operates a network of over 500 transport lines (buses, trams, trolleybuses) serving nearly 7,000 stations. Approximately 1,500 vehicles operate daily under the Metropolitan Transport Authority brand. Passengers can track real-time departures using around 550 Dynamic Passenger Information System (SDIP) boards. SDIP is a main component of passenger information, displaying departure times, transport updates, and air quality information. New boards include cameras to enhance safety at stops.

== Operators ==
Metropolitan Transport Authority's transport lines (buses, trams, trolleybuses) are operated by enterprises:

- Municipal:
  - Metropolitan Transport Company in Świerklaniec
  - Municipal Transport Company in Katowice
  - Municipal Transport Company in Sosnowiec
  - Municipal Transport Company in Tychy
  - Municipal Transport Company in Gliwice
  - Tychy Trolleybus Lines
  - Silesian Interurbans
- Private, including:
  - Motor Transport Company in Grodzisk Mazowiecki
  - Motor Transport Company in Gostynin
  - Motor Transport Company in Tarnobrzeg
  - PKS Południe
  - INTRANS Group Anna Szelejewska
  - Irex Sosnowiec
  - Kłosok
  - Lazar Zendek
  - Nowak Transport
  - Transgór Mysłowice
  - Transport Pawelec

Additionally, these and other operators form consortia. In total, Metropolitan Transport Authority contracts over 20 entities, including consortia, to operate its lines.

== Tickets ==
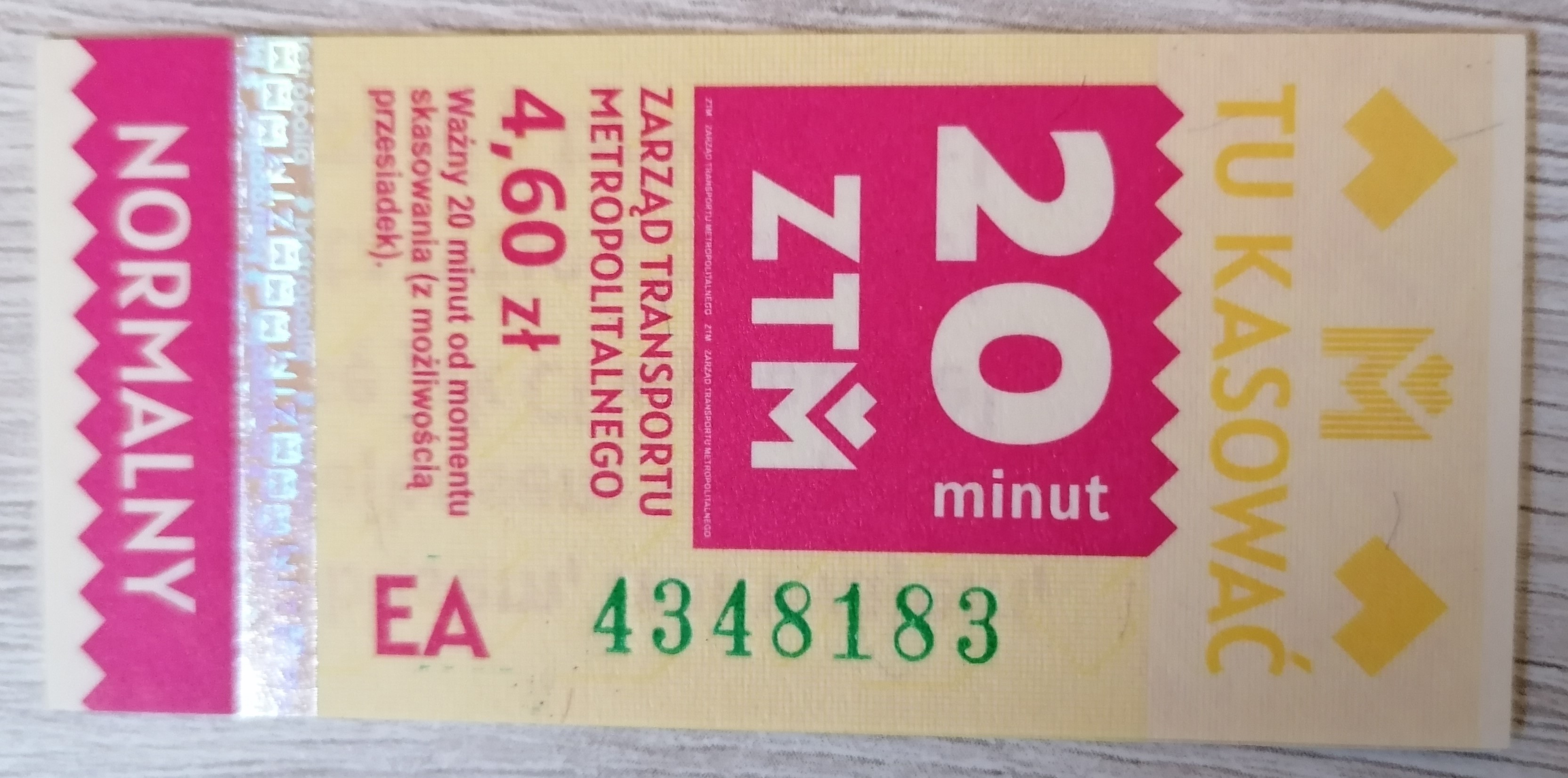
20-minute ticket (April 2024)

Metropolitan Transport Authority offers single-use (short-term) tickets in time-based formats (20, 40, and 90 minutes). Multi-ride tickets (20, 40, or 80 rides, valid for 180 days) can be encoded on the Silesian Public Services Card or online applications. Medium-term tickets include daily (valid on the day of activation), 24-hour, and 7-day tickets. Long-term tickets are available for 30, 90, or 180 days.

The full ticket range, including season tickets, can be purchased via the dedicated Metroappka Transport GZM app introduced in 2024.

== Metrotickets ==
Metrotickets are personalized monthly tickets allowing unlimited travel on Metropolitan Transport Authority services and Silesian Railways trains within the GZM area (depending on the ticket type, excluding special-fare or commercial trains). Two variants (Red and Whole Metropolis) also allow unlimited travel on the Katowice–Sławków route operated by POLREGIO (excluding special-fare or commercial trains).

Logo of the Transport GZM system

Passengers can choose from seven Metroticket variants (standard and discounted): Katowice Zone, five color-coded zones (Red, Blue, Orange, Green, Yellow), and a Whole Metropolis ticket.

=== Metroticket variants ===
- Katowice Zone – valid within Katowice city: Metropolitan Transport Authority public transport and all Silesian Railways railways.
- Yellow – valid across the entire Metropolitan Transport Authority network and Silesian Railways railway sections: Tarnowskie Góry–Katowice Zone (inclusive) and Bytom–Gliwice.
- Green – valid across the entire Metropolitan Transport Authority network and Silesian Railways railway sections: Gliwice–Katowice Zone (inclusive), Knurów–Gliwice.
- Red – valid across the entire Metropolitan Transport Authority network and Silesian Railways railway section Dąbrowa Górnicza Sikorka – Katowice Zone (inclusive), plus the POLREGIO section Katowice–Sławków.
- Blue – valid across the entire Metropolitan Transport Authority network and Silesian Railways railway section Nowy Bieruń–Katowice Zone (inclusive).
- Orange – valid across the entire Metropolitan Transport Authority network and Silesian Railways railway sections: Tychy Lodowisko–Katowice Zone (inclusive), Łaziska Górne Brada–Katowice Zone (inclusive), Kobiór–Katowice Zone (inclusive).

Purchasing a color-coded zone ticket automatically includes access to the Katowice Zone.

== Development and service quality ==
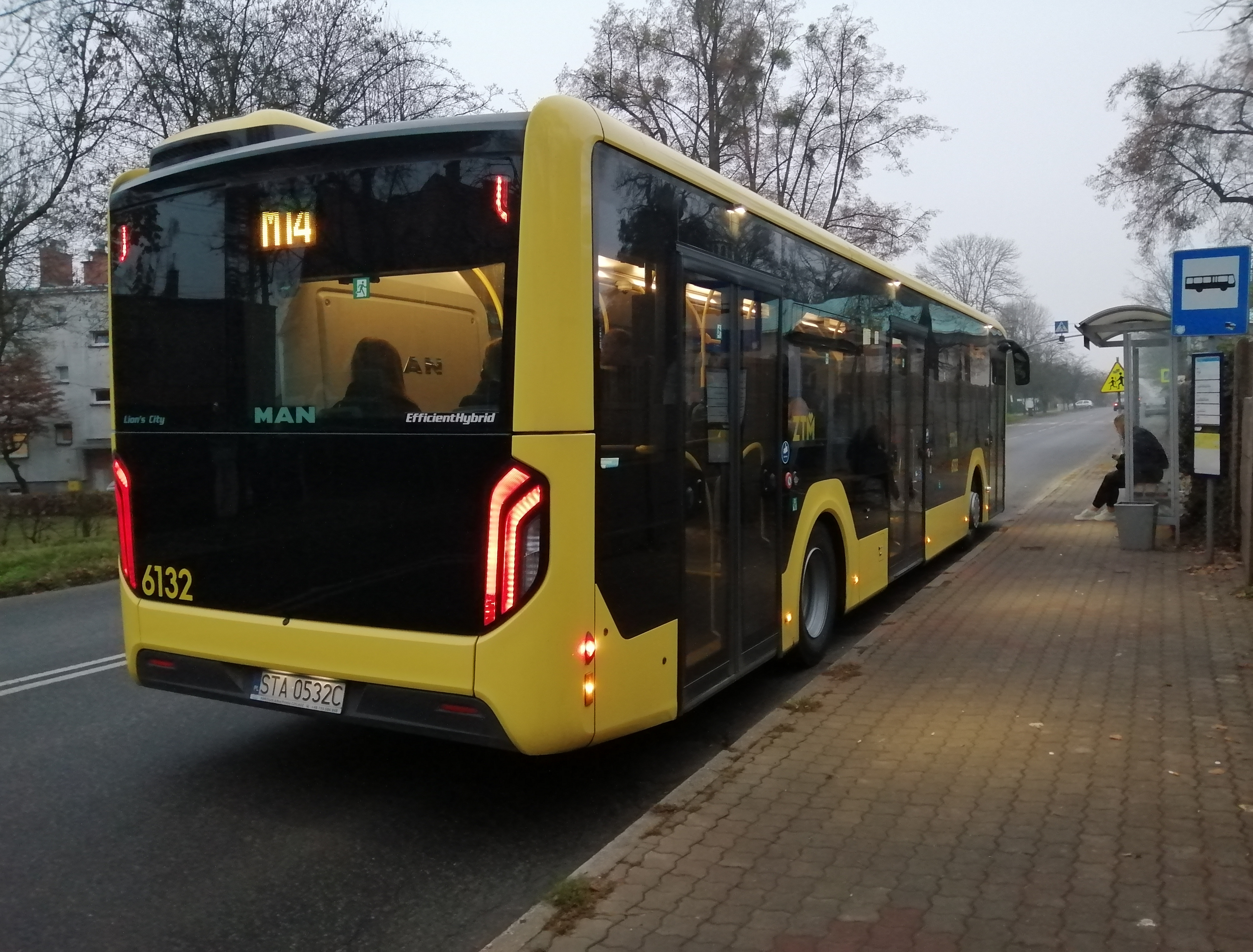
MAN Lion's City 12 EfficientHybrid bus on metropolitan line M14

Metropolitan Transport Authority, beyond ongoing changes due to roadworks or new infrastructure, develops long-term modernization and improvement plans for its network.

=== Metropolitan Transport Authority metrolines ===
As of February 2024, 32 metropolitan lines ("Metrolines") operate within Metropolis GZM, managed by Metropolitan Transport Authority:

Line number	Starting station	Ending station	Served municipalities	Launch date	Source
M1	Katowice Adam Mickiewicz Street (Katowice Dworzec)	Gliwice Centrum Przesiadkowe	Katowice, Chorzów, Świętochłowice, Ruda Śląska, Zabrze, Gliwice	8 May 2021	
M24	Katowice Adam Mickiewicz Street	Zabrze Johann Goethe Street	Katowice, Chorzów, Świętochłowice, Ruda Śląska, Zabrze	8 May 2021	
M2	Katowice Piotr Skarga Street (Katowice Dworzec)	Gołonóg Zajezdnia (Tworzeń Katowice Steelworks)	Katowice, Sosnowiec, Dąbrowa Górnicza	8 May 2021	
M3	Katowice Piotr Skarga Street (Katowice Dworzec)	Tarnowskie Góry Dworzec	Katowice, Chorzów, Bytom, Tarnowskie Góry	8 May 2021	
M4	Katowice Piotr Skarga Street (Katowice Dworzec)	Zagórze Zajezdnia (Ostrowy Górnicze Pomnik)	Katowice, Sosnowiec	8 May 2021	
M18	Tychy Osiedle Z1	Gliwice Centrum Przesiadkowe	Tychy, Mikołów, Gierałtowice, Gliwice	8 May 2021	
M22	Katowice Sądowa transfer center	Międzyrzecze Gospoda	Katowice, Mysłowice, Imielin, Lędziny, Bieruń, Bojszowy	3 July 2021	
M101	Katowice Sądowa transfer center	Wesoła Wesoła Mine	Katowice, Mysłowice	3 July 2021	
M102	Tarnowskie Góry Dworzec	Bytom Dworzec	Tarnowskie Góry, Radzionków, Bytom	7 August 2021	
M108	Tychy Winter Stadium	Imielin Wiadukt	Tychy, Bieruń, Chełm Śląski, Imielin	7 August 2021	
AP	Katowice Sądowa transfer center	Pyrzowice Katowice Airport	Katowice, Ożarowice	1 January 2022	
M19	Sosnowiec Urząd Miasta	Pyrzowice Katowice Airport	Sosnowiec, Będzin, Psary, Mierzęcice, Ożarowice	1 January 2022	
M100	Gliwice Centrum Przesiadkowe	Sośnicowice Centrum Przesiadkowe	Gliwice, Sośnicowice	12 February 2022	
M104	Żerniki Osiedle	Stanica Kościół	Gliwice, Pilchowice	12 February 2022	
M28	Katowice Freedom Square	Osiedle Wieczorka Dworzec	Katowice, Siemianowice Śląskie, Piekary Śląskie	12 February 2022	
M14	Gliwice Centrum Przesiadkowe	Siedliska Cargo (Pyrzowice Port Lotniczy)	Gliwice, Zbrosławice, Zabrze, Bytom, Tarnowskie Góry, Świerklaniec, Ożarowice, Mierzęcice	12 March 2022	
M107	Pyskowice Szpitalna (Pyskowice Wyszyński Square)	Tarnowskie Góry Dworzec	Pyskowice, Zbrosławice, Tarnowskie Góry	25 June 2022	
M105	Pyskowice Szpitalna Street	Szczygłowice Centrum Przesiadkowe	Pyskowice, Gliwice, Knurów	25 June 2022	
M10	Katowice Wojciech Korfanty Avenue	Kobiór Centrum (Tychy Osiedle Z1)	Katowice, Tychy, Kobiór	16 July 2022	
M11	Katowice Sądowa transfer center	Siedliska Cargo	Katowice, Siemianowice Śląskie, Piekary Śląskie, Wojkowice, Bobrowniki, Ożarowice, Mierzęcice	30 July 2022	
M16	Gliwice Centrum Przesiadkowe	Osiedle Wieczorka Dworzec	Gliwice, Zabrze, Bytom, Piekary Śląskie	20 August 2022	
M116	Osiedle Wieczorka Dworzec	Pyrzowice Port Lotniczy (Katowice Airport)	Piekary Śląskie, Bobrowniki, Ożarowice, Mierzęcice	20 August 2022	
M23	Katowice Piotr Skarga Street	Siewierz Dom Kultury	Katowice, Sosnowiec, Będzin, Psary, Siewierz	3 September 2022	
M15	Tychy Towarowa Street	Sosnowiec Szpital Wojewódzki	Tychy, Lędziny, Mysłowice, Sosnowiec	10 November 2022	
M109	Mydlice Pętla	Sławków Metal Products Plant	Dąbrowa Górnicza, Sławków	10 November 2022	
M106	Gliwice Centrum Przesiadkowe	Rudziniec Rudziniec Gliwicki	Gliwice, Rudziniec	1 January 2023	
M103	Dobieszowice Skrzyżowanie	Dąbrowa Górnicza Dąbrowa Górnicza railway station	Bobrowniki, Psary, Dąbrowa Górnicza	14 January 2023	
M25	Katowice Sądowa transfer center	Czeladź Dworzec	Katowice, Siemianowice Śląskie, Czeladź	25 February 2023	
M12	Katowice Sądowa transfer center	Gostyń Drzymały	Katowice, Mikołów, Łaziska Górne, Wyry	3 June 2023	
M13	Katowice Sądowa transfer center	Bobrek Inwestycyjna Pętla II	Katowice, Mysłowice, Sosnowiec	3 June 2023	
M17	Bytom Dworzec	Sosnowiec Urząd Miasta	Bytom, Piekary Śląskie, Siemianowice Śląskie, Czeladź, Sosnowiec	3 June 2023	
M21	Bytom Dworzec	Wygoda Skrzyżowanie	Bytom, Ruda Śląska, Mikołów	23 September 2023	

== Awards ==
In 2021, Metropolitan Transport Authority received the Friendly Employer 2020 award from the National Employee Trade Union Konfederacja Pracowników for balancing the challenges of the COVID-19 pandemic with employee well-being and safety.

In 2023, Metropolitan Transport Authority won the national Masz Głos competition organized by the Stefan Batory Foundation, recognized in the Super Samorząd category for collaboration between local communities and municipal authorities.

== Management ==
The director of Metropolitan Transport Authority is Małgorzata Gutowska. Operations are coordinated by: Krzysztof Dzierwa (Deputy Director for Administration), Aleksander Sobota (Deputy Director for Transport), Adam Sujkowski (Deputy Director for Controlling), and Chief Accountant Ewa Długosz.
