= Bobrowniki, Silesian Voivodeship =

Bobrowniki
- Village
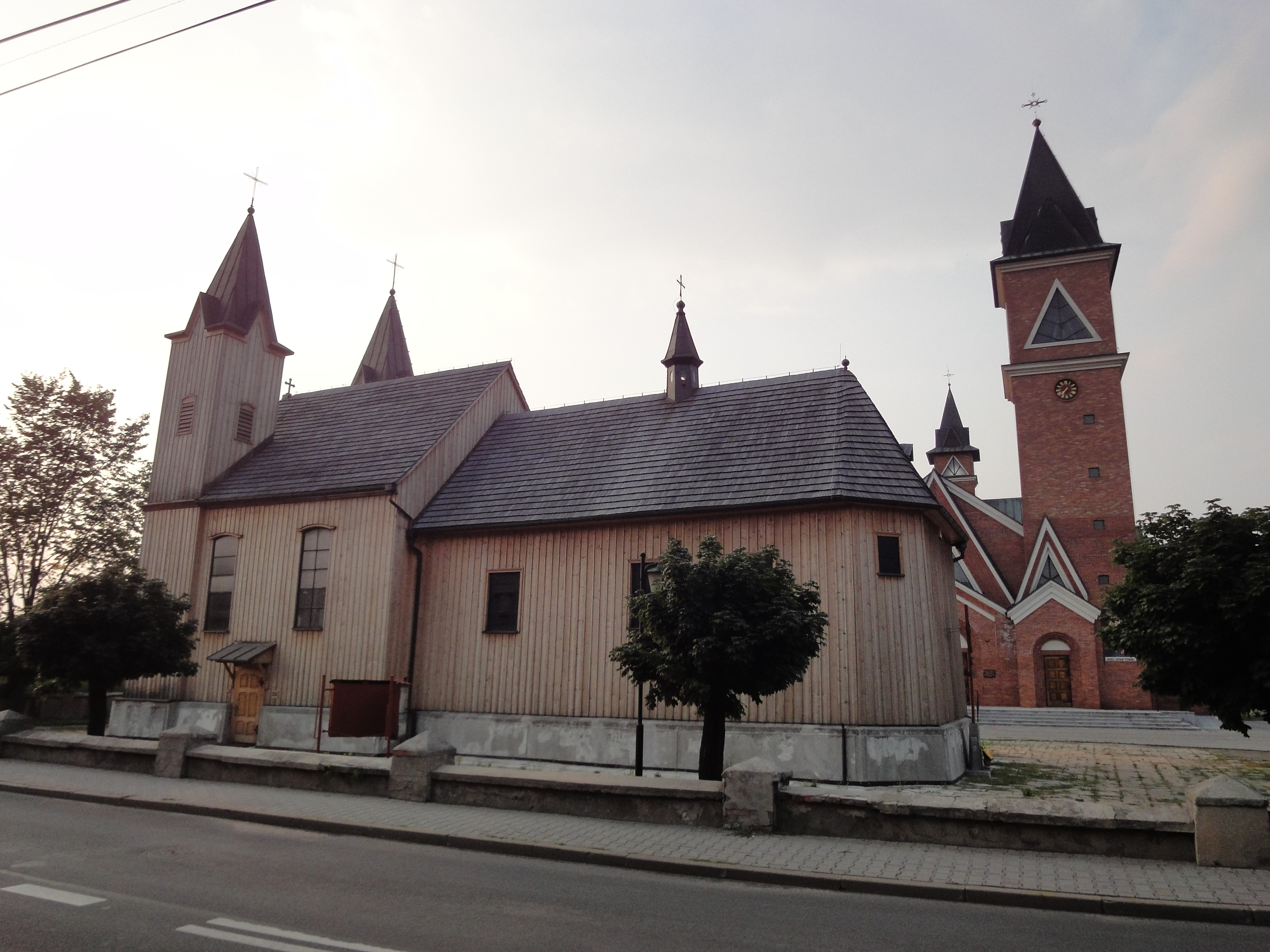
- Saint Lawrence church in Bobrowniki

- Location within Poland
- Coordinates: 50°22′48″N 18°59′41″E
- Country: Poland
- Voivodeship: Silesian
- County: Będzin
- Gmina: Bobrowniki
- Population: 2,926
- Website: http://www.bobrowniki.com

Bobrowniki [bɔbrɔvˈɲikʲi] is a village in Będzin County, Silesian Voivodeship, in southern Poland. It is the seat of the gmina (administrative district) called Gmina Bobrowniki.
