= Rogoźnik, Silesian Voivodeship =

Rogoźnik
- Village
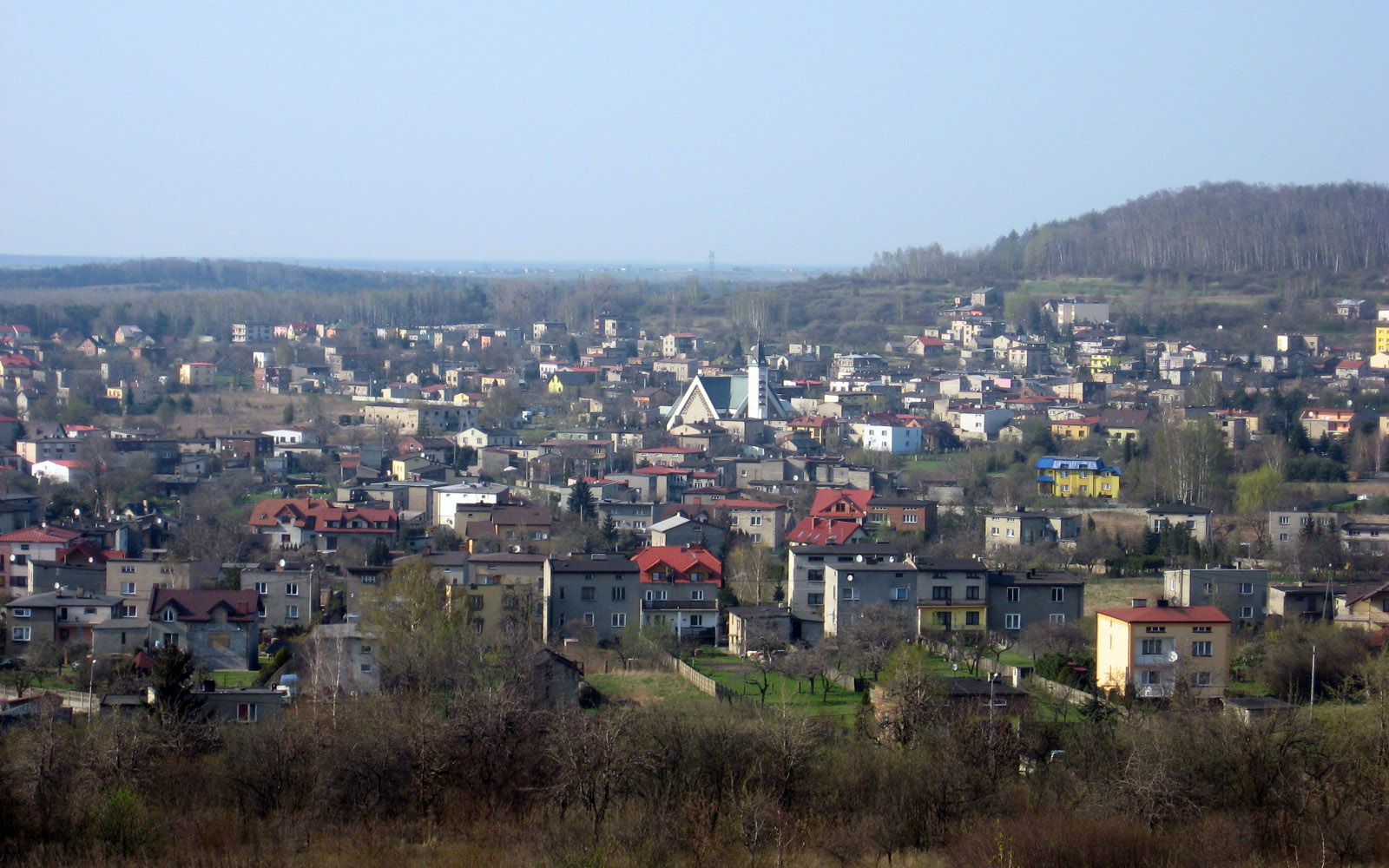

- Location within Poland
- Coordinates: 50°23′22.2″N 19°02′29.5″E
- Country: Poland
- Voivodeship: Silesian
- County: Będzin
- Gmina: Bobrowniki
- Area: 8.8 km^{2} (3.4 sq mi)
- Highest elevation: 377 m (1,237 ft)
- Population: 2,753
- Time zone: UTC+1 (CET)
  - Summer (DST): UTC+2 (CEST)
- Postal code: 42-582
- Area code: +48 32
- Car plates: SBE

Rogoźnik [rɔˈɡɔʑɲik] is a village in the administrative district of Gmina Bobrowniki, within Będzin County, Silesian Voivodeship, in southern Poland.
