= Siemonia =

- Village
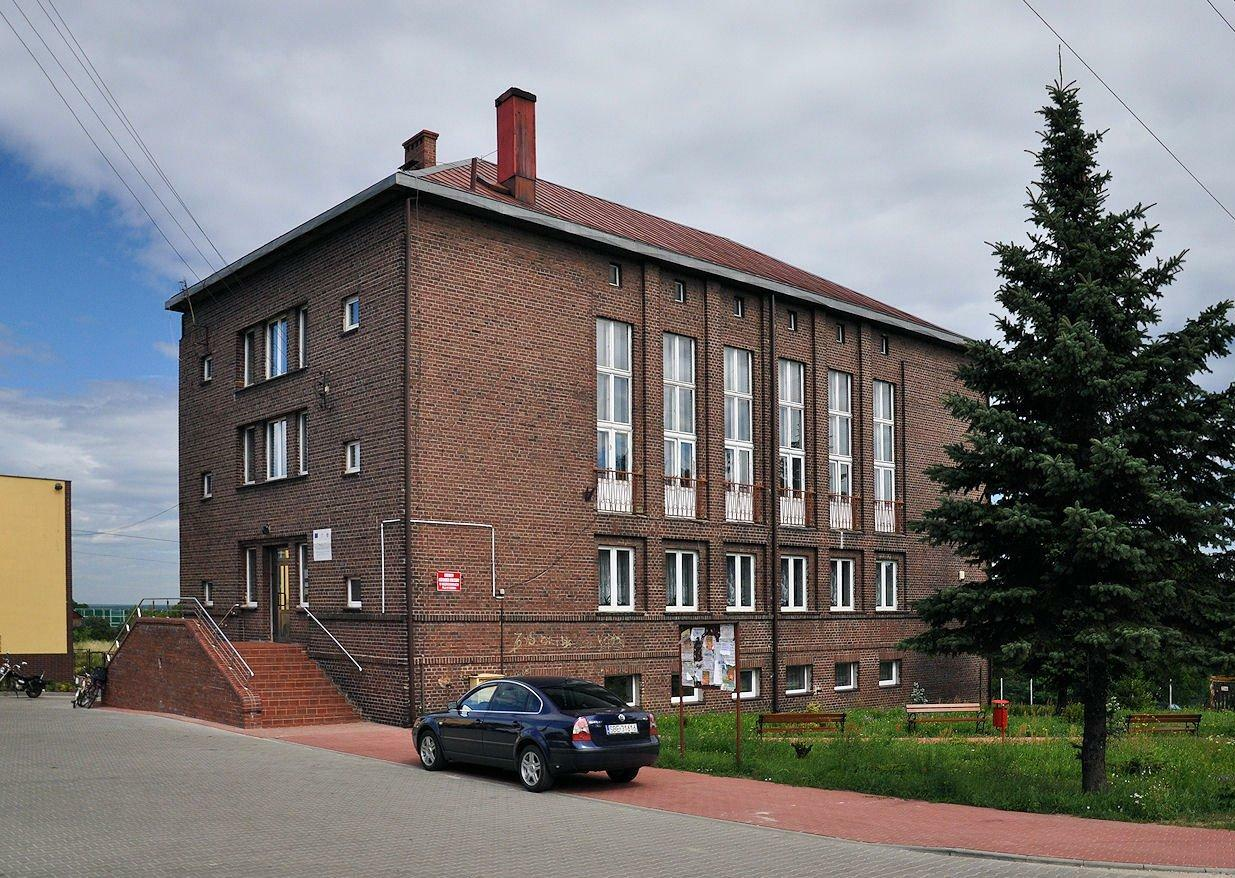

- Location within Poland
- Coordinates: 50°25′N 19°3′E
- Country: Poland
- Voivodeship: Silesian
- County: Będzin
- Gmina: Bobrowniki
- Population: 937

Siemonia [ɕɛˈmɔɲa] is a village in the administrative district of Gmina Bobrowniki, within Będzin County, Silesian Voivodeship, in southern Poland.
