= Dobieszowice, Silesian Voivodeship =

Dobieszowice
- Village
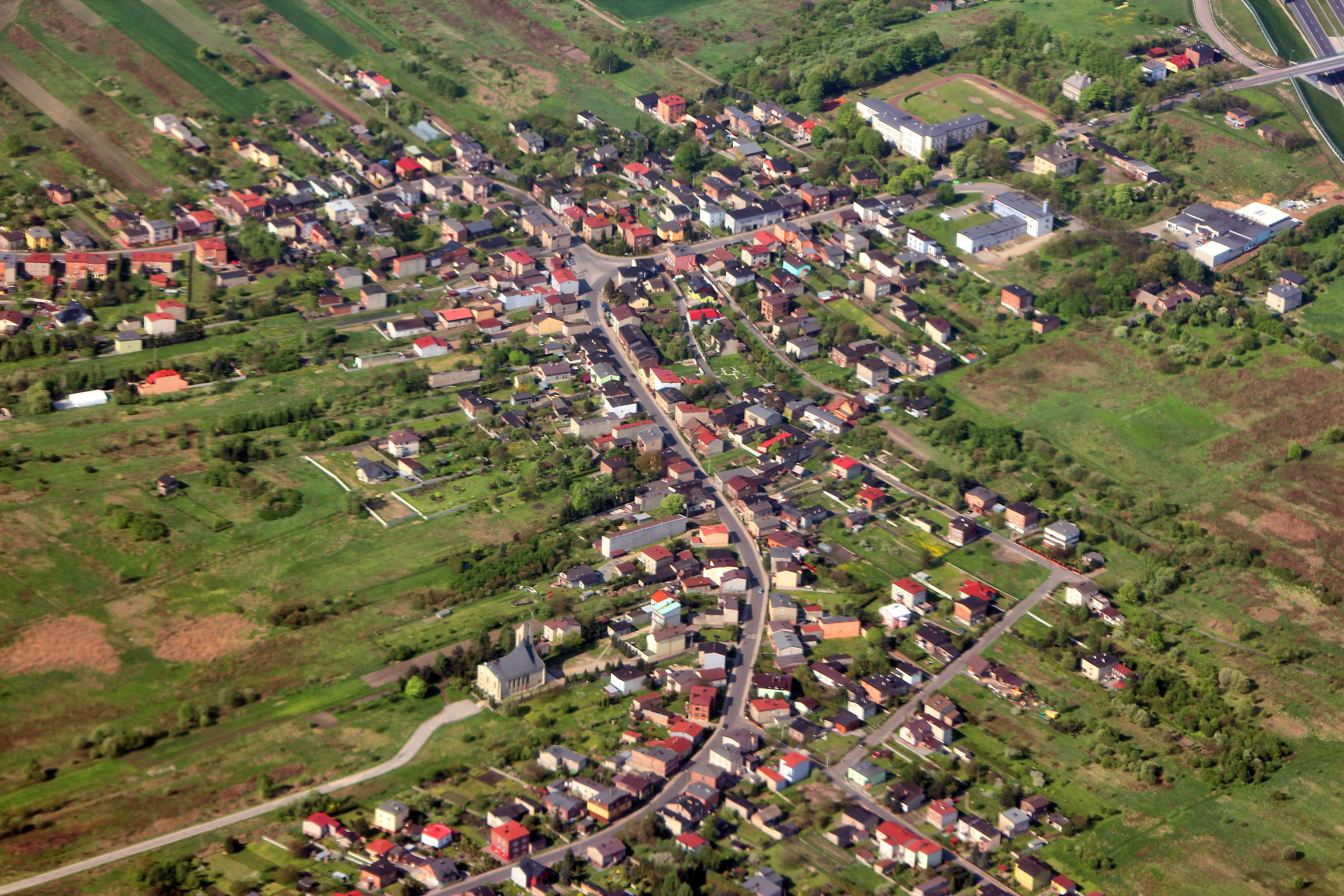
- Aerial view

- Location within Poland
- Coordinates: 50°23′41″N 19°0′15″E
- Country: Poland
- Voivodeship: Silesian
- County: Będzin
- Gmina: Bobrowniki
- Population: 1,891

Dobieszowice [dɔbʲɛʂɔˈvʲit͡sɛ] is a village in the administrative district of Gmina Bobrowniki, within Będzin County, Silesian Voivodeship, in southern Poland.
