= Gmina Bobrowniki, Silesian Voivodeship =

Gmina Bobrowniki Bobrowniki Commune
- Gmina
- Coat of arms
- Interactive map of Gmina Bobrowniki
- Coordinates (Bobrowniki): 50°22′48″N 18°59′41″E
- Country: Poland
- Voivodeship: Silesian
- County: Będzin
- Seat: Bobrowniki

Area
  - Total: 51.99 km^{2} (20.07 sq mi)

Population (2019-06-30)
  - Total: 12,077
  - Density: 232.3/km^{2} (601.6/sq mi)
- Website: https://www.bobrowniki.pl/

Gmina Bobrowniki is a rural gmina (administrative district) in Będzin County, Silesian Voivodeship, in southern Poland. Its seat is the village of Bobrowniki, which lies approximately 11 kilometres (7 mi) north-west of Będzin and 15 km (9 mi) north of the regional capital Katowice.

The gmina covers an area of 51.99 square kilometres (20.1 sq mi), and as of 2019 its total population is 12,077.

== Villages ==
Gmina Bobrowniki contains the villages and settlements of Bobrowniki, Dobieszowice, Myszkowice, Rogoźnik, Siemonia and Twardowice.

== Neighbouring gminas ==
Gmina Bobrowniki is bordered by the towns of Będzin, Piekary Śląskie, Tarnowskie Góry and Wojkowice, and by the gminas of Mierzęcice, Psary and Świerklaniec.
