= Trolleybuses in Tychy =

Electric transport system in Tychy, Poland

Tychy trolleybus system
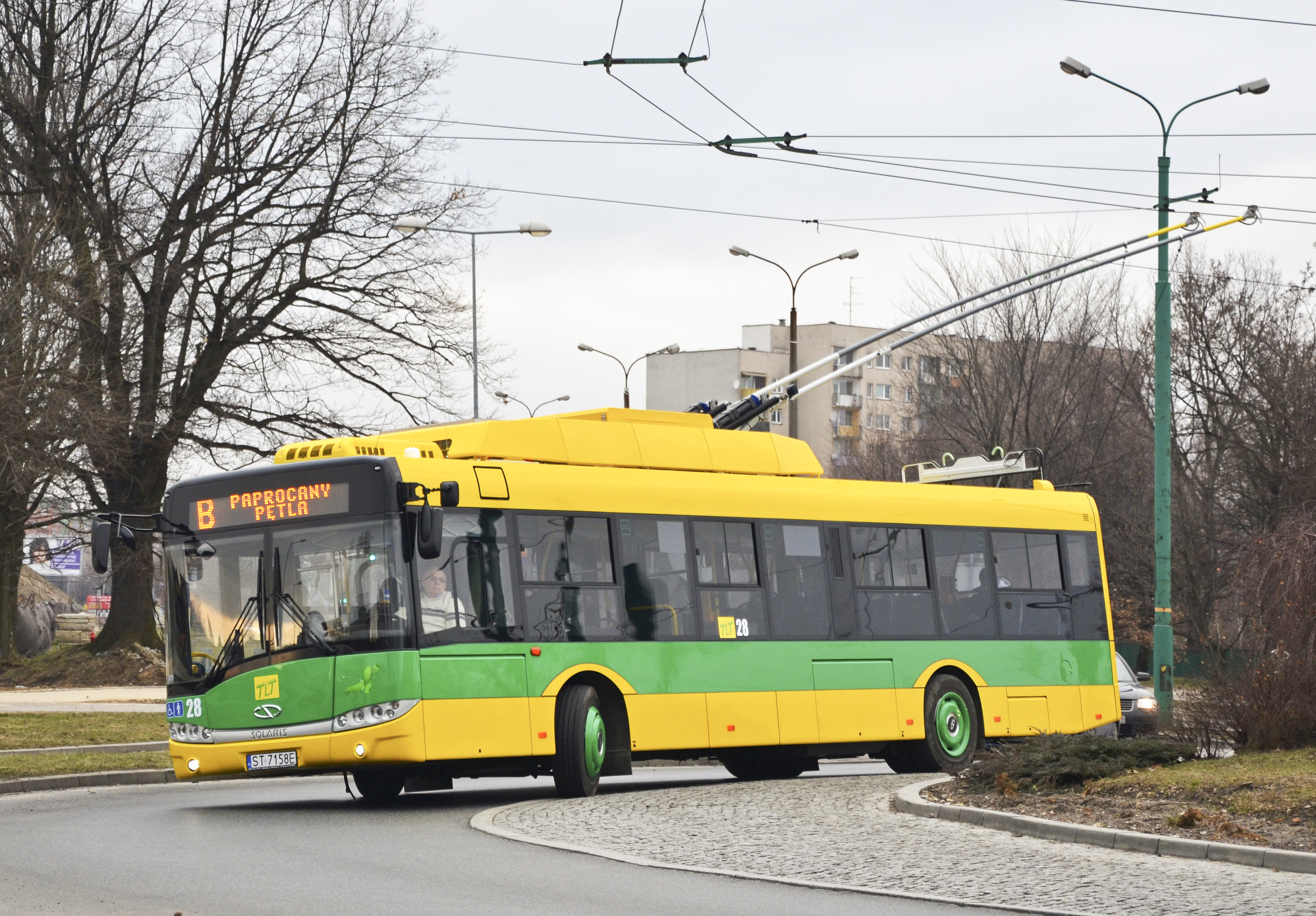
- A Solaris Trollino 12 in Tychy, 2013

Operation
- Locale: Tychy, Poland
- Open: 1 October 1982
- Status: Open
- Routes: 8
- Operator: Tyskie Linie Trolejbusowe Sp. z o.o.

Infrastructure
- Electrification: 660 V DC

Statistics
- Track length (total): 40 km (25 mi)
- Website: http://www.tlt.pl/index.php TLT (in Polish)

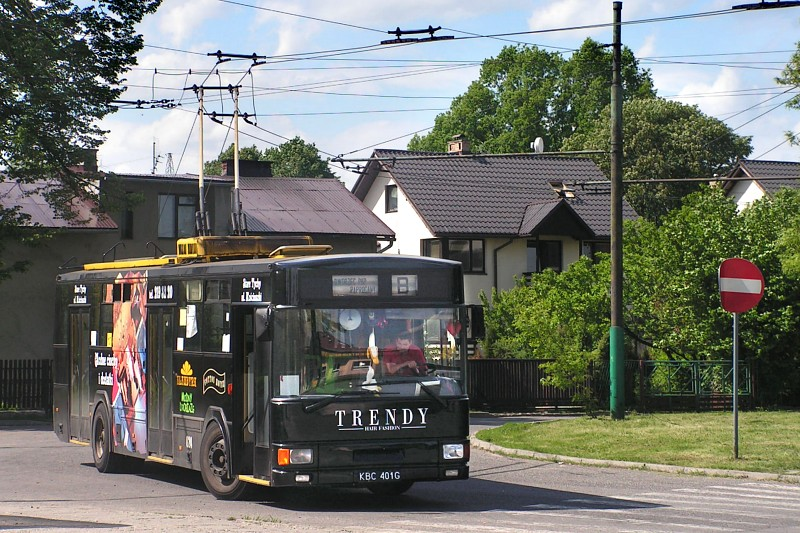
One of the Jelcz high-floor trolleybuses that served the system before 2015, this example wearing an advertising wrap

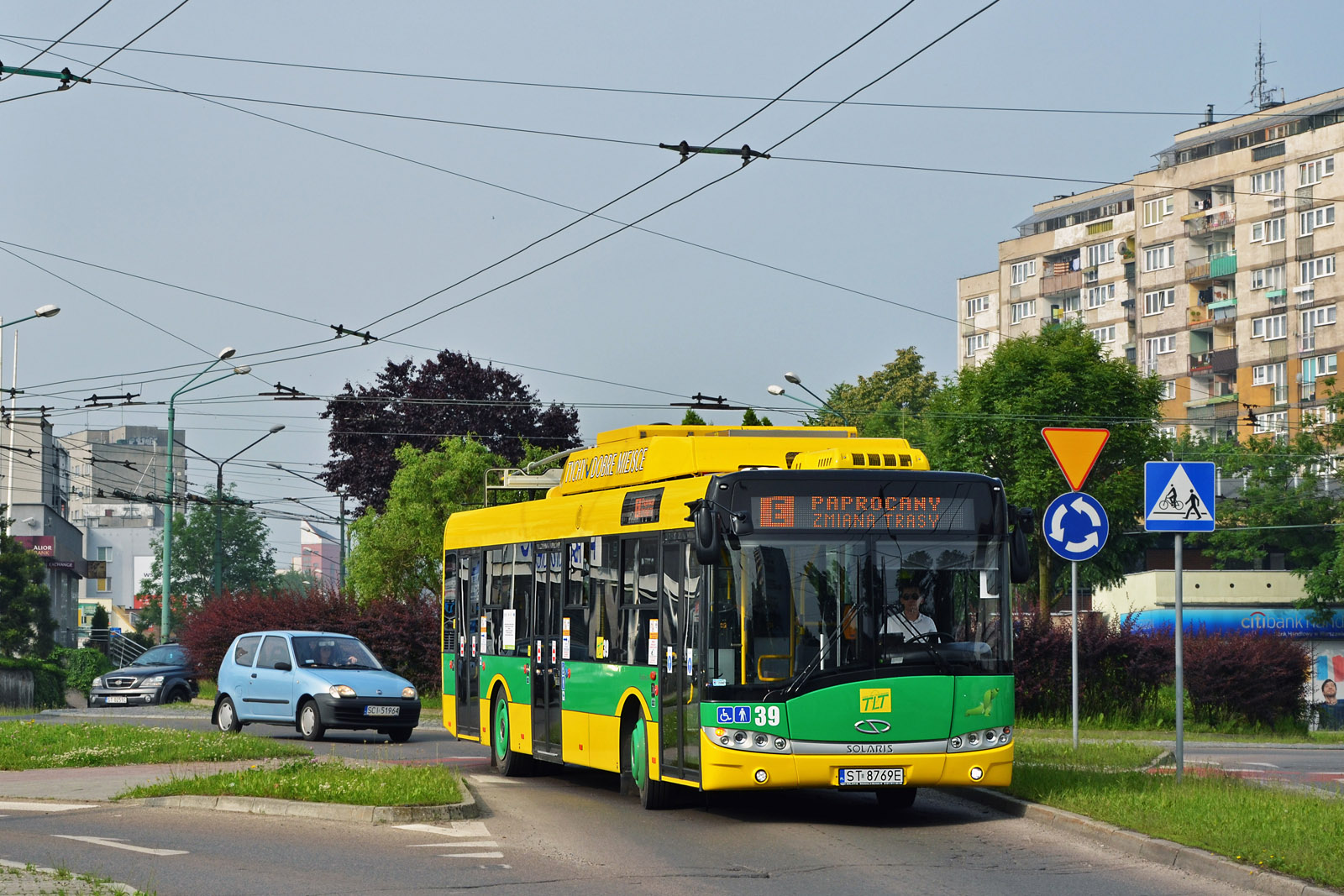
A Solaris Trollino 12 on line E on battery power (during a traffic diversion)

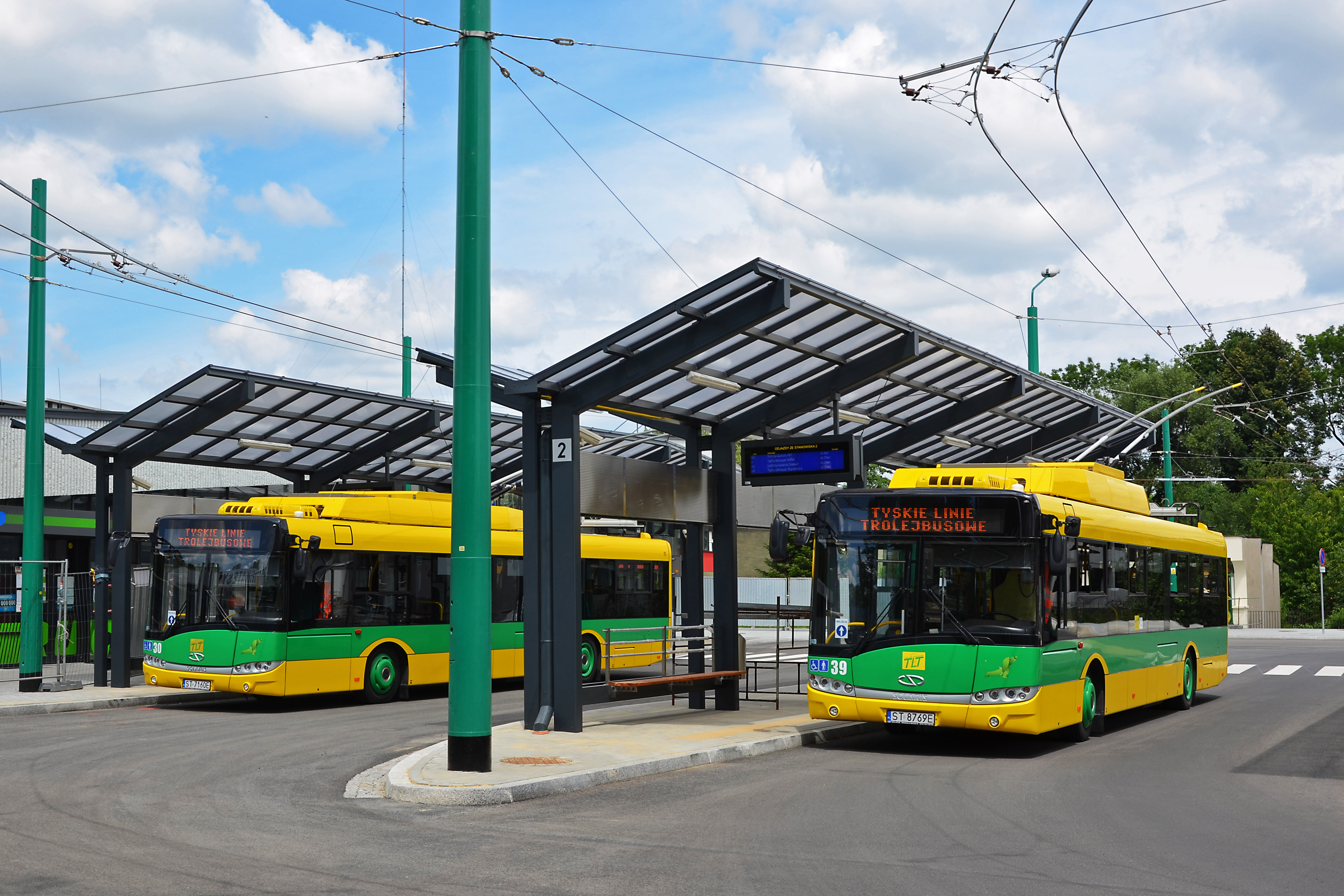
Two Solaris Trollino 12MB at Tychy railway station

Trolleybuses in Tychy form part of the public transport service in the city of Tychy, Poland. The system opened in 1982 and is one of only three trolleybus systems still in operation in Poland. Currently, the fleet consists of 21 low-floor trolleybuses of the type Solaris Trollino 12. In the past, high-floor vehicles of the types ZIU-9, Jelcz PR110E and Jelcz 120MT were used.

Traction power is provided by two traction substations (2×800 kW and 3×800 kW). Overhead wiring has a cross section of 12 mm^{2} and it hangs 5.8 to 6.2 m above the street.

== History ==
The Tychy trolleybus system opened on 1 October 1982, and was the first new trolleybus system to open in Poland since 1953. The first route connected Krasickiego and Towarow, and the initial fleet consisted of 12 Russian-built ZIU-9 trolleybuses, of 20 on order. The original paint scheme was red-and-cream. A second route, numbered 2, from Tychy railway station ("Leninowa" at that time) to Przemysłowa, had opened by 1984. In 1985, the arrival of 12 more trolleybuses expanded the fleet to 24 vehicles, numbered 701–724. Route 3 (Lenina – Przemysłowa via Engelsa [now Ulica Jana III Sobieskiego] and Fornalskiej [now Bolesława Chrobrego]) opened in 1985, and route 4 (Leninowa–Paprocany) had opened by 1987. In 1992, routes 1 and 3 were discontinued and the designations of routes 2 and 4 were changed to A and B, respectively – and all Tychy trolleybus routes have been designated by letters since that time. Additional services, each partially duplicating existing routes, came and went, including night-time routes designated C and D, but by at least 1999 there were four all-day routes, A through D, in operation.

A new trolleybus built in Poland by Jelcz joined the fleet in 1989, numbered 725, and additional Jelcz trolleybuses were acquired subsequently. Seven Jelcz trolleybuses were acquired in 1997 from the Słupsk trolleybus system, and Tychy's last active ZIU trolleybuses were withdrawn in 1997 or 1998. Most of the Jelcz vehicles were repainted in an all-yellow livery in 1998, and by 2000 the entire trolleybus fleet was painted all-over yellow. A new route E opened on 2 September 2002. It had the same termini as route B, but differed in the middle, and 1.2 km (0.75 mi) of new overhead wiring was installed for it along Jana Pawła II—the first new wiring added to this system (other than at the depot) since at least the early 1990s.

The system received its first Solaris trolleybus (and first low-floor trolleybus) in 2003, and additional Solaris units followed gradually. In December 2012, the first of 15 more Solaris Trollino trolleybuses was delivered, and it introduced a new livery of green and yellow, which was planned to be applied to all future new trolleybuses. A new route F was introduced in 2013 but was withdrawn after only 2–3 months after being deemed unsuccessful. However, a different route F was put into operation on 6 May 2015. The last Jelcz trolleybuses, the fleet's last high-floor trolleybuses, were retired in April 2015. A new route G began operation in September 2019, and route E was modified to complement it. Both routes E and G had sections without overhead wires, and because the fleet's three then-newest Solaris trolleybuses (Nos. 40–42) were the only vehicles with batteries powerful enough to cover the unwired sections of those routes, those trolleybuses were initially the only ones that could be used on routes E and G. Route 293 of another transport company in Tychy was taken over by the trolleybus operator on 1 January 2021 and became trolleybus route H.

== Lines ==
As of December 2025, the eight lines in operation were as follows:

| Line | Route |
|---|---|
| A | Towarowa - Hipermarekty - Paprocańska - Piłsudskiego - Hala Sportowa - Skałka - Osiedle "K" - Osiedle "R" - Stoczniowców 70 - Hetmańska - Harcerska - Hotelowiec - E.LECLERC - Gen. Andersa - Dworzec PKP Dworzec PKP - Budowlanych - Carboautomatyka - E.LECLERC - Hotelowiec - Begonii - Harcerska - Hetmańska - Stoczniowców 70 - Osiedle "R" - Osiedle "K" - Skałka - Hale Targowe - Hala Sportowa - Piłsudskiego - Paprocańska - Hipermarkety - Towarowa - Towarowa Skrzyżowanie - Towarowa Rondo - Przemysłowa I - Przemysłowa II - Przemysłowa Hurtownie - Metalowa - Zajezdnia |
| B | Sikorskiego Wiadukt - Osiedle "Z1" - Osiedle "Z" – Jezioro Paprocańskie - Paprocany Pętla - Paprocany Dymarek - Osiedle "T" - Osiedle "O" - Lodowisko - Szpital Wojewódzki - Filaretów - Edukacji - Pływalnia - Stadion - Bielska - Hotelowiec - E.LECLERC - Gen. Andersa - Dw.PKP T-bus Dworzec PKP - Budowlanych - Carboautomatyka - E.LECLERC - Hotelowiec - Stadion - Pływalnia - Edukacji - Filaretów - Szpital Wojewódzki - Lodowisko - Wyszyńskiego - Osiedle "O" – Osiedle "T" - Paprocany Dymarek - Paprocany Pętla - Jezioro Paprocańskie - Osiedle "Z" - Osiedle "Z1" - Sikorskiego Wiadukt |
| C | Towarowa - Hipermarkety - Paprocańska - Piłsudskiego - Hala Sportowa - Dmowskiego - Jana Pawła II - Żwakowska - Harcerska - Hotelowiec - E.LECLERC - Gen. Andersa - Dworzec PKP Dworzec PKP - Budowlanych - Carboautomatyka - E.LECLERC - Hotelowiec - Begonii - Harcerska - Żwakowska - Jana Pawła II - Dmowskiego - Hale Targowe - Hala Sportowa - Piłsudskiego - Paprocańska - Hipermarkety - Towarowa - Towarowa Skrzyżowanie - Towarowa Rondo - Przemysłowa I - Przemysłowa II - Przemysłowa Hurtownie - Metalowa - Towarowa |
| D | Towarowa - Hipermarkety - Paprocańska - Osiedle "O" - Lodowisko - Wyszyńskiego - Szpital Wojewódzki - Filaretów - Edukacji - Pływalnia - Stadion - Bielska - Hotelowiec - E.LECLERC - Gen. Andersa - Dworzec PKP Dworzec PKP - Budowlanych - Carboautomatyka - E.LECLERC - Hotelowiec - Stadion - Pływalnia - Edukacji - Filaretów - Szpital Wojewódzki - Lodowisko - Wyszyńskiego - Osiedle "O" - Paprocańska - Hipermarkety - Towarowa - Towarowa Skrzyżowanie - Towarowa Rondo - Przemysłowa I - Przemysłowa II - Przemysłowa Hurtownie - Metalowa - Zajezdnia |
| E | Sikorskiego Wiadukt - Osiedle "Z1" - Osiedle "Z" - Jezioro Paprocańskie - Paprocany Pętla - Paprocany Dymarek - Osiedle "T" - Śródmieście - Rondo Cassino - Gen. Grota-Roweckiego - Elfów - Pływalnia - Stadion - Bielska - Begonii - Harcerska - Hetmańska - Stoczniowców 70 - Osiedle "R" - Osiedle "L" - Cztery Pory Roku - Tężnia - Sikorskiego Kościół - Osiedle "W" - Paprocany Dymarek - Paprocany Pętla - Jezioro Paprocańskie - Osiedle "Z" - Osiedle "Z1" - Sikorskiego Wiadukt |
| F | Szpital Wojewódzki - Filaretów - Edukacji - Elfów - Gen. Grota-Roweckiego - Dmowskiego - Skałka - Osiedle "K" - Osiedle "R" - Stoczniowców 70 - Hetmańska - Harcerska - Hotelowiec - Stadion - Pływalnia - Edukacji - Filaretów - Szpital Wojewódzki Szpital Wojewódzki - Wyszyńskiego - Lodowisko - Osiedle "O" - Piłsudskiego - Hala Sportowa - Dmowskiego - Gen. Grota-Roweckiego - Elfów - Pływalnia - Bielska - Begonii - Harcerska - Hetmańska - Stoczniowców - Osiedle "R" - Osiedle "K" - Skałka - Hale Targowe - Hala Sportowa - Piłsudskiego - Osiedle "O" - Lodowisko - Wyszyńskiego - Szpital Wojewódzki |
| G | Sikorskiego Wiadukt - Osiedle "Z1" - Osiedle "Z" - Jezioro Paprocańskie - Paprocany Pętla - Paprocany Dymarek - Osiedle "W" - Sikorskiego Kościół - Tężnia - Osiedle "U" - Osiedle "L" - Osiedle "R" - Stoczniowców 70 - Hetmańska - Harcerska - Hotelowiec - Stadion - Pływalnia - Elfów - Gen. Grota-Roweckiego - Rondo Cassino - Śródmieście - Osiedle "O" - Osiedle "T" - Paprocany Dymarek - Paprocany Pętla - Jezioro Paprocańskie - Osiedle "Z" - Osiedle "Z1" - Sikorskiego Wiadukt |
| H | Szpital Wojewódzki - Tęcza - Urząd Miasta - Niepodległości - Gen. Grota-Roweckiego - Dmowskiego - Brama Słońca - Osiedle "U" - Osiedle "L" - Jaśkowicka - Żwaków Borowa II - Suble Działki - Suble Chałupnicza - Hetmańska - Żwakowska - Bielska Wiadukt - Bielska Szpital - Czarnieckiego - Hotelowiec - E.LECLERC - Gen. Andersa - Dworzec PKP Dworzec PKP - Budowlanych - Carboautomatyka - E.LECLERC - Begonii - Czarnieckiego - Bielska Szpital - Bielska Wiadukt - Żwakowska - Hetmańska - Suble Chałupnicza - Suble Działki - Żwaków Borowa II - Żwaków Myśliwska - Żwaków Nowa - Żwaków św. Elżbiety - Żwaków Cmentarz - Żwaków Rondo - Żwaków Legionów - Osiedle "L" - Cztery Pory Roku - Osiedle "U" - Brama Słońca - Dmowskiego - Gen. Grota-Roweckiego - Niepodległości - Urząd Miasta - Tęcza - Szpital Wojewódzki |
