= Wojkowice (disambiguation) =

Wojkowice is a town in Silesian Voivodeship (south Poland).

Wojkowice may also refer to:

- Wojkowice, Lower Silesian Voivodeship, a village in Wrocław County, Lower Silesian Voivodeship (south-west Poland)
- Wojkowice Kościelne, a village
- Vojkovice (Frýdek-Místek District), a village in the Czech Republic

== See also ==
- Vojkovice (disambiguation)
