= Hektary, Silesian Voivodeship =

Hektary
- Village
- Location within Poland
- Coordinates: 50°25′46″N 19°11′57″E
- Country: Poland
- Voivodeship: Silesian
- County: Będzin
- Gmina: Siewierz
- Population: 58

Hektary [xɛkˈtarɨ] is a village in the administrative district of Gmina Siewierz, within Będzin County, Silesian Voivodeship, in southern Poland.
