= List of Warsaw Shore episodes =

The following is a list of episodes for the Polish television programme, Warsaw Shore that first aired on MTV on 10 November 2013.

== Series overview ==
| Series | Episodes | Originally aired | |
| Series | Episodes | First aired | Last aired |
|---|---|---|---|
| 1 | 11 +2 specials | 10 November 2013 | 2 February 2014 |
| 2 | 13 | 20 April 2014 | 13 June 2014 |
| 3 | 16 +2 specials | 29 March 2015 | 4 October 2015 |
| 4 | 12 | 11 October 2015 | 3 January 2016 |
| 5 | 16 | 28 February 2016 | 26 June 2016 |
| 6 | 12 | 28 August 2016 | 13 November 2016 |
| 7 | 12 | 26 February 2017 | 21 May 2017 |
| 8 | 12 | 3 September 2017 | 19 November 2017 |
| 9 | 12 | 18 March 2018 | 17 June 2018 |
| 10 | 12 | 21 October 2018 | 20 January 2019 |
| 11 | 13 | 24 March 2019 | 24 June 2019 |
| 12 | 13 | 22 September 2019 | 22 December 2019 |
| 13 | 13 | 6 September 2020 | 14 October 2020 |
| 14 | 12 +1 special | 15 November 2020 | 7 February 2021 |
| 15 | 12 +1 special | 28 March 2021 | 27 June 2021 |
| 16 | 12 +1 special | 19 September 2021 | 12 December 2021 |
| 17 | 12 +1 special | 18 September 2022 | 18 December 2022 |
| 18 | 13 | 19 March 2023 | 25 June 2023 |
| 19 | 13 | 17 September 2023 | 10 December 2023 |
| 20 | 13 | 17 March 2024 | 16 June 2024 |
| 21 | 13 | 19 September 2024 | 22 December 2025 |

== Episodes ==
=== Series 1 (2013-2014) ===
| No. overall | No. in season | Title | Duration | Original release date | Polish viewers (thousands) |
|---|---|---|---|---|---|
| 1 | 1 | "Episode 1" | 60 minutes | 10 November 2013 | 230,000 |
Eight people arrive in the new home: a villa with a swimming pool, a gym and a big garden. Paweł arrives first, followed by Eliza. She immediately catches his eye, so the whole evening is devoted to trying to seduce her. When all the residents arrive, the party moves to the swimming pool. At the very beginning, conflict erupts between the girls. Anna and Ewelina do not like the behaviour of the other tenants. Wojtek and Trybson arrange a show of force.
| 2 | 2 | "Episode 2" | 60 minutes | 17 November 2013 | 140,116 |
The group meets their boss Żaneta. They will be working at a gym. Everyone gets a lesson about taking responsibility. Emotional dilemmas are accompanied by a question - who will land in the "sleep room" first. All residents of the house take part in the first event at a club.
| 3 | 3 | "Episode 3" | 60 minutes | 24 November 2013 | 149,994 |
The first misunderstanding happens in the group. The boys get into a fight, Eliza loses control, and Ewelina goes to the hospital. The girls also investigate how the alcohol went missing. Is it a punishment or somebody playing a prank?
| 4 | 4 | "Episode 4" | 60 minutes | 1 December 2013 | 210,827 |
Radosław Majdan, a Polish former football goalkeeper, visits the house. This creates a stir among members of the group. Anna cooks dinner for him. Eliza wonders how to prepare to meet her idol. After a conversation with Radosław, they appreciate his wisdom. In addition, the gang carefully prepares for another photo session. At one point, a brawl breaks out between Paweł and Anna. Both do not mince words. Mała and Wojtek continue to get closer. In the evening, the team goes to a party.
| 5 | 5 | "Episode 5" | 60 minutes | 8 December 2013 | 159,827 |
A meeting on the set, a visit to Mariusz's parents' farm, and a party in an international company. In addition, Paweł invites Anna to dinner at a Greek restaurant. Eliza has too much alcohol. Trybson tries to pick up a Portuguese girl and take her home. In the house there is a brawl between him and Paweł.
| 6 | 6 | "Episode 6" | 60 minutes | 15 December 2013 | N/A |
The team watches the football match between Poland and England. Beautiful Brazilian girls are at the bar and four men are in their element. Another member catches Eliza's eye. Others ride go-karts and bungee jump. Anna leaves the house.
| 7 | 7 | "Episode 7" | 60 minutes | 22 December 2013 | 184,698 |
A well-known person comes to the house. Paweł ends up in a love triangle. Ewelina starts a fight in one of clubs in Katowice. Trybson loses self-control and decides to go all the way. Żaneta is horrified by the state of the house. She gives them an ultimatum: if the house is not cleaned, the party will be cancelled.
| 8 | 8 | "Episode 8" | 60 minutes | 29 December 2013 | 277,288 |
With help from friends and fans, the team organizes a Hawaiian party to celebrate Paweł's birthday. They make a big mess, leading to a massive clean up in the morning. The boys try to persuade Anna to reconcile with the other girls.
| 9 | 9 | "Episode 9" | 60 minutes | 5 January 2014 | N/A |
Paweł and Mariusz go to the florist. While left to themselves, the girls wage fierce quarrels. Getting away from duties upsets Anna, while Eliza has an accident. At night the girls suspect the house is haunted. Wojtek plays a prank on his gullible roommates. Trybson tries to share his love for martial arts. Mariusz is injured, while Wojtek and Paweł fight. While most of the group goes to a party, Anna and Ewelina stay at home. The time spent together changes the relationship between the two girls.
| 10 | 10 | "Episode 10" | 60 minutes | 12 January 2014 | 217,195 |
The gang arrives in Kraków. They wander beneath Wawel to take a pic of the famous dragon living there. Later, an evening event turns out to be much more important than the legendary reptile. Paweł invites a girl he just met to the limousine, but Anna gets the best bird. After returning to Warsaw, the group takes part in salsa lessons. Wojtek tries to pick up the instructor with the help of Mała. Back at the house, cast members from the program In & Out pay a visit.
| 11 | 11 | "Episode 11" | 60 minutes | 19 January 2014 | 265,796 |
Holly and Scott from Geordie Shore come to the house. The two British guests discover Polish hospitality. After dinner, the hosts and guests go to a party. Mała and Eliza compete for attention from the British hunk. In the club, Paweł picks up a new girl. Mariusz disappears with one to the toilets. There is an international conflict between Ewelina and Scott. After the party, the crew prepares for the MTV EMA Pre-Party. The next day everyone says goodbye to each other before heading home.
| – | – | "Best Bits" | 60 minutes | 26 January 2014 | N/A |
A look back at the most memorable moments from the first series.
| – | – | "Reunion" | 60 minutes | 2 February 2014 | N/A |
Katarzyna Kępka hosts as the cast reunite to discuss the events of the first series.

=== Series 2 (2014) ===
| No. overall | No. in season | Title | Duration | Original release date | Polish viewers (thousands) |
|---|---|---|---|---|---|
| 12 | 1 | "Episode 1" | 60 minutes | 20 April 2014 | 69,130 |
The group reunites at their new house. Jakub "Ptyś" joins the team. Eliza and Trybson have big news: they are together and she is pregnant. Therefore, they will not be staying at the house and leave the next day.
| 13 | 2 | "Episode 2" | 60 minutes | 27 April 2014 | 88,906 |
Following the departure of Eliza and Trybson, new members Alicja and Alan arrive. The group has their first night out. Ewelina acts out when Paweł wants to take a girl home. Later she is injured and goes to the hospital. In the morning, Ptyś is surprised to wake up next to Mała.
| 14 | 3 | "Episode 3" | 60 minutes | 4 May 2014 | 213,912 |
The group goes to a gym. At the pool, the boys run around naked. Wojtek runs into a friend at the club. She and Paweł have a mutual attraction. Ewelina resorts to desperate measures to ensure Paweł will not go to bed with another woman.
| 15 | 4 | "Episode 4" | 60 minutes | 11 May 2014 | 205,843 |
Ewelina and Mała want to get along with the guys. The group goes spray tanning, with mixed results. Wojtek becomes the victim of another joke that requires him to keep cold blood. Anna's feelings for Alan are getting stronger.
| 16 | 5 | "Episode 5" | 60 minutes | 18 May 2014 | N/A |
Ptyś decides to take revenge on a prankster. Alicja gradually loses her temper. Working together at the car wash brings Alan and Anna even closer together. Later on Alan leaves to take part a wrestling event in Croatia.
| 17 | 6 | "Episode 6" | 60 minutes | 25 May 2014 | N/A |
Surprise guests come to the house. The team is asked to prepare dinner for somebody important. It's Mariusz Pudzianowski who gives them some life advice. Alicja's boyfriend visits and convinces her to go home with him.
| 18 | 7 | "Episode 7" | 60 minutes | 1 June 2014 | N/A |
Malwina arrives at the house. The group travels to Poznań for a fun night at the club. Anna's loyalty is tested when she is tempted by attractive people. Meanwhile in Croatia Alan's competition takes place. Despite an intimidating opponent, he is victorious.
| 19 | 8 | "Episode 8" | 60 minutes | 8 June 2014 | N/A |
Ewelina chooses Paweł to accompany her on the helicopter ride. Wojtek tries to play a prank on Ptyś, but is caught in the act. Alan returns to the group. He is immediately caught in a love triangle with Mała and Anna. Żaneta tells the group they will be taking a bartending class.
| 20 | 9 | "Episode 9" | 60 minutes | 15 June 2014 | 224,777 |
Anna is more and more jealous of Alan. The men are fascinated by exotic dancers at a club. Malwina and Mała decide they should have their own fun and invite strippers to the home. Mała explains the case of "pathology" in connection with boys.
| 21 | 10 | "Episode 10" | 60 minutes | 22 June 2014 | N/A |
The first house party takes place. Tensions come to a boil and Anna and Alan have an argument about his connection with Mała. The next day everyone shops for costumes to wear to a party. Anna is not feeling well and stays home. Everyone enjoys their new job at a burger restaurant.
| 22 | 11 | "Episode 11" | 60 minutes | 29 June 2014 | N/A |
Things get heated at the costume party. Ptyś injures his foot and goes to the hospital. Mała gets into a fight when somebody insults her. Paweł reunites with Wojtek's attractive friend. At home there is another argument between the two men. Paweł and Ewelina rekindle their romance.
| 23 | 12 | "Episode 12" | 60 minutes | 6 July 2014 | N/A |
The team travels to a club in Wrocław. After a long night of partying, everyone falls asleep in the bus. When they wake up, they are surprised to realize they are in another country. They arrive at a hotel then visit a sex museum.
| 24 | 13 | "Episode 13" | 60 minutes | 13 July 2014 | N/A |
After a day of site-seeing in Prague it's time to eat. Language barriers cause confusion at the restaurant. When the team returns to Warsaw, they visit the burger restaurant for the last time. In the morning it is time to pack, say goodbye, and go home.

=== Series 3 (2015) ===
| No. overall | No. in season | Title | Duration | Original release date | Polish viewers (thousands) |
|---|---|---|---|---|---|
| 25 | 1 | "Episode 1" | 60 minutes | 29 March 2015 | 85,615 |
The team has two new members. Magda immediately gets close with Alan. She also becomes friends with a grateful Mała, who had a falling out with Ewelina. Damian is handsome but naive. He makes an ambitious bet with Paweł.
| 26 | 2 | "Episode 2" | 60 minutes | 5 April 2015 | 92,260 |
A heavy morning comes after a crazy night. Damian wakes up in the sleeping room next to a girl. The group meet their serious new boss Jacek. Magda is in her element, using her dancing skills to lead the team during a salsa course.
| 27 | 3 | "Episode 3" | 60 minutes | 12 April 2015 | 129,511 |
Anna decides to pack her suitcases, but changes her mind about leaving. Ewelina and Mała are forced to go to work together at a hair salon. After a night out Damian uses his meter again. The group are also witnesses of a fight.
| 28 | 4 | "Episode 4" | 60 minutes | 19 April 2015 | N/A |
The group takes part in a volleyball match. During an evening at home, mysterious phone calls and flickering lights frighten the girls. Paweł and Wojtek fill two whips. Meanwhile, Mała teaches Damian how to be beautiful.
| 29 | 5 | "Episode 5" | 60 minutes | 26 April 2015 | N/A |
Anna hears a surprising declaration of love from Damian. Magda is stressed out when she discovers that she is starting to have feelings for Alan. Ptyś surprises the group at a club event, to the delight of his former housemates.
| 30 | 6 | "Episode 6" | 60 minutes | 3 May 2015 | N/A |
The team has a wild night out. Damian uses the clicker again. Meanwhile Paweł and Ewelina end up together on the couch. Anna feels the consequences of not going to work. She disagrees with the boss about his decision, but accepts that she will not change his mind.
| 31 | 7 | "Episode 7" | 60 minutes | 10 May 2015 | N/A |
The boys team up to play the biggest prank yet. When the girls come home, they realize that all of their things are not where they are supposed to be. A fight breaks out and the boys lock themselves in the girls' room. In the end Anna breaks the door down.
| 32 | 8 | "Episode 8" | 60 minutes | 17 May 2015 | N/A |
Magda ends up in the refrigerator after a night of drinking. Damian's alter ego "Stifler" emerges when he is partying at the club. A beautiful artist visits the house. The team learns that they will be making a painting with their bodies. They get very creative and messy.
| 33 | 9 | "Episode 9" | 60 minutes | 24 May 2015 | N/A |
The team goes to an amusement park. Everyone has fun until Magda and Damian get sick. Later they go to the fortune-teller. Some do not believe in it, while others are completely convinced. Ewelina asks about her romance with Paweł. The next day Wojtek, Alan, and Ewelina go to work at a sushi restaurant.
| 34 | 10 | "Episode 10" | 60 minutes | 31 May 2015 | N/A |
There is a party at the house with friends and fans. Alan upsets both Anna and Magda. The latter decides to get revenge by pouring water on his bed. Alan is very angry when he finds out. His rage wakes up Wojtek and his girlfriend. The next day everyone participates in a military themed competition, with surprising results.
| 35 | 11 | "Episode 11" | 60 minutes | 7 June 2015 | 148,901 |
The group goes to the spa, where Paweł pulls a prank during the massages. Alan is remorseful and tries to reconcile with the rest of the group. At a club, Damian is attracted to a woman with a strong personality. Unfortunately things do not go as planned when he brings her to the house.
| 36 | 12 | "Episode 12" | 60 minutes | 14 June 2015 | 121,755 |
Eliza visits and tells the group she is engaged to Trybson. Everyone is excited to see her except for Ewelina and Paweł. Mała, Magda, Anna, and Wojtek help Eliza choose a wedding dress. Somebody accidentally starts a fire in the yard, resulting in a chaotic night. The next day the group goes to Toruń to watch Trybson take part in a wrestling event.
| 37 | 13 | "Episode 13" | 60 minutes | 30 August 2015 | N/A |
There is a party at a club to celebrate Trybson's victory. Alan is interested in a female friend of Paweł's, leading to tension between the two men. Back at the house, a photo collage of beautiful women fascinates the group. They take another trip to an event in Sopot where they are greeted by Malwina.
| 38 | 14 | "Episode 14" | 60 minutes | 6 September 2015 | 224,777 |
Jacek says that there will be a change in the group. Everybody starts worrying that somebody will leave. Wojtek is the victim of a mysterious prankster. The group comes home to find a new member in the house. Klaudia joins the team.
| 39 | 15 | "Episode 15" | 60 minutes | 13 September 2015 | N/A |
Alan and Damian are smitten with the mysterious Klaudia. Paweł tells the group that he is the one who will be going home. Later he says that it was a joke and nobody's leaving. The girls find smelly fish in the toilet. The group hosts the final house party.
| 40 | 16 | "Episode 16" | 60 minutes | 20 September 2015 | N/A |
During the party Ewelina and Paweł question their relationship. They have a painful fight which leads to Paweł being kicked out. Everyone tries to support and help Ewelina. Meanwhile, Damian finds out that he beat the record. The group reflects on the most eventful season so far.
| – | – | "The Trybsons, Part I" | 60 minutes | 27 September 2015 | N/A |
Eliza and Trybson discuss getting to know each other and falling in love during series 1. They get even closer after they go home. Eliza's pregnancy is a complete surprise. Trybson moves to Tuliszów so they can start a life together. Eliza gives birth to a baby girl.
| – | – | "The Trybsons, Part II" | 60 minutes | 4 October 2015 | N/A |
The new parents adjust to life with Victoria. Trybson plans his proposal to Eliza. He surprises her during a romantic evening. The lovebirds travel to a fancy hotel. Trybson trains hard for an upcoming wrestling match while Eliza releases her first single.

=== Series 4 (2015-2016) ===
| No. overall | No. in season | Title | Duration | Original release date | Polish viewers (thousands) |
|---|---|---|---|---|---|
| 41 | 1 | "Episode 1" | 60 minutes | 11 October 2015 | 90 105 |
Jacek sends everyone a message that they have to immediately go to Łeba. Some of them have complications, but everyone eventually gets to the house. Ptyś returns to the team. Klaudia brings her Yorkshire Terrier named Gangster. Anna and Mała share an intimate moment while Magda and Alan end up in the sleep room. Damian unsuccessfully tries to impress the girls. The team takes part in a parade.
| 42 | 2 | "Episode 2" | 60 minutes | 18 October 2015 | 121 596 |
Damian loses his meter during a wild night out. Klaudia and Ptyś get closer. The team starts their new job at a beach bar. Later on they go horseback riding. At the club Alan has enough of Damian's behaviour and hits him. Anna comforts Damian on the way home.
| 43 | 3 | "Episode 3" | 60 minutes | 1 November 2015 | 118 022 |
Alan gets into an argument with Magda and Mała. He packs up his bags and leaves. In the morning the boys are exhausted and skip work. Alan returns to the house with gifts for Magda and Mała. Jacek gives the group a lecture on responsibility.
| 44 | 4 | "Episode 4" | 60 minutes | 8 November 2015 | N/A |
Mała and Wojtek sleep together as do Klaudia and Ptyś. The same night Alan and Damian bring several women home. The next day Klaudia has an accident involving the infamous elephant sculpture. The boys face a difficult punishment for not going to work while the girls go to the beautician.
| 45 | 5 | "Episode 5" | 60 minutes | 15 November 2015 | 144 918 |
Magda and Anna try to convince Damian to get dressed. Mała and Wojtek spend more time in the sleep room. Anna's mother calls and asks her to come home. She leaves the house. The team has a fun night at the beach until an argument ruins the mood.
| 46 | 6 | "Episode 6" | 60 minutes | 22 November 2015 | N/A |
The team accidentally floods the kitchen when trying to add water to the pool. Mała is jealous when Wojtek dances with another woman. Magda and Wojtek are the winners of a go-kart race. Anna returns to the house.
| 47 | 7 | "Episode 7" | 60 minutes | 29 November 2015 | N/A |
Jacek is upset because of the mess in the house. He sends the group on a camping trip in the forest. The boys want to go sleep early. Unfortunately, the girls are very drunk and loud. Wojtek has enough and takes down the tents.
| 48 | 8 | "Episode 8" | 60 minutes | 6 December 2015 | 144 300 |
Jacek finds out that Ptyś and Klaudia were drunk at work. Wojtek opens up about his recent health problems. He won't be leaving, but cannot drink alcohol. Everybody supports him, saying it is most important that he stays.
| 49 | 9 | "Episode 9" | 60 minutes | 13 December 2015 | 129 463 |
Emotions run high during a night at the club. Ptyś is devastated after a fight with Klaudia. Damian and Alan also argue. The next day Damian surprises his friend Marta with flowers. The team takes part in a labyrinth race.
| 50 | 10 | "Episode 10" | 60 minutes | 20 December 2015 | N/A |
The team organizes a romantic evening for Damian and Marta. Klaudia helps a garbage collector as punishment for getting drunk at work. Ptyś was supposed to join her, but is still very drunk from the previous night.
| 51 | 11 | "Episode 11" | 60 minutes | 27 December 2015 | N/A |
Jacek is happy that Ptyś cleaned the house and believes he learned his lesson. The team goes windsurfing. Anna is annoyed when her boyfriend shows up while the team is at the club. Ptyś celebrates his birthday.
| 52 | 12 | "Episode 12" | 60 minutes | 3 January 2016 | N/A |
The team is asked to prepare lunch for surprise guests. Trybson and Eliza visit the house. There is a beach party to celebrate Summer Camp. One guest throws a glass at Magda. Anna comes to her rescue. In the morning the team reluctantly leaves the house.

=== Series 5 (2016) ===
| No. overall | No. in season | Title | Duration | Original release date | Polish viewers (thousands) |
|---|---|---|---|---|---|
| 53 | 1 | "Episode 1" | 60 minutes | 28 February 2016 | 108 038 |
The team arrives in Wrocław. They are curious about the new members. It turns out to be twins Pauly and Piotr. They immediately become friends with Damian, who is single again after his breakup with Marta. Meanwhile Magda and Mała convince Anna to let loose.
| 54 | 2 | "Episode 2" | 60 minutes | 6 March 2016 | 130 592 |
Mała, Wojtek, and Piotr play a prank on Pauly when he is asleep. The team goes to their workplace, which will be a bar. The boys try to get the attention of the beautiful bar owner. The group goes to their first club event this season.
| 55 | 3 | "Episode 3" | 60 minutes | 13 March 2016 | 141 390 |
After a wild night, the team wakes up to a big mess. Klaudia and Magda start a prank war with the twins. Later everybody takes part in an Escape Room challenge. Ptyś is injured at the club and goes to the hospital.
| 56 | 4 | "Episode 4" | 60 minutes | 20 March 2016 | N/A |
Jacek has a serious talk with the team about Ptyś's accident and the behaviour of Damian and the twins at work. The group watches the previous season together. Wojtek is embarrassed during scenes of his romance with Mała. Magda comforts Mała when Wojtek's behaviour upsets her.
| 57 | 5 | "Episode 5" | 60 minutes | 27 March 2016 | N/A |
After a long night everybody sleeps in. As a result Wojtek, Magda, and Mała don't go to work. The girls decide to get revenge on Wojtek. Ewelina arrives at the house. Everybody is happy about her return, except for Anna.
| 58 | 6 | "Episode 6" | 60 minutes | 3 April 2016 | N/A |
Anna, Magda, and Klaudia have a fun night at home. Meanwhile everyone else goes to the club to celebrate Ewelina rejoining the team. They return to the house with several women. Wojtek decides to reconcile with Magda and Mała.
| 59 | 7 | "Episode 7" | 60 minutes | 10 April 2016 | N/A |
The team goes to a pub to watch a football match between Poland and the Czech Republic. Damian and Pauly get into a fight, leaving Piotr caught in the middle. The next day the group starts their new job at a beauty salon. Anna gives Ptyś a lesson in painting nails.
| 60 | 8 | "Episode 8" | 60 minutes | 17 April 2016 | N/A |
The team organizes a surprise birthday party for Damian. After the celebration they go to a club where Anna has a big fight with the twins. Ptyś comforts her on the way home. The next day Mała, Wojtek, and Ewelina give each other spa treatments at work. Klaudia and Magda are very sick. Anna decides to leave the show.
| 61 | 9 | "Episode 9" | 60 minutes | 24 April 2016 | N/A |
The boys all have a great time at the club. Back at the house, the girls decide to play a prank. They hide the boys' mattresses. The plan backfires for Klaudia when Ptyś takes her to his bed. Mała believes there is a ghost in the house. The next day the team goes to a winery in Zielona Góra
| 62 | 10 | "Episode 10" | 60 minutes | 8 May 2016 | N/A |
The team travels to Berlin. They spend the day learning about German culture. In the hotel room the boys prank the girls by locking them in the washroom. At night it's time to attend a party. With Wojtek's help, Magda has a great evening with somebody she met at the club.
| 63 | 11 | "Episode 11" | 60 minutes | 15 May 2016 | N/A |
The group takes a boat tour then drinks a lot of beer at a restaurant. After Piotr upsets her at a club, Mała breaks down. Wojtek tries to help, but she asks him to leave her alone. The next day the team returns to Wrocław.
| 64 | 12 | "Episode 12" | 60 minutes | 22 May 2016 | N/A |
Everybody gets new tattoos when an artist visits the house. As punishment for missing work, Mała, Magda, Klaudia, and Wojtek work on a horse farm. Damian finds a smelly surprise under his bed. The team visits Szklarska Poręba.
| 65 | 13 | "Episode 13" | 60 minutes | 29 May 2016 | N/A |
The team learns about old traditions in the mountains. Later on there is a wild pool party. After returning home, they clean up the house. Mała and Piotr bond during a night out. Damian and Pauly worry that they are losing their friend to love.
| 66 | 14 | "Episode 14" | 60 minutes | 5 June 2016 | N/A |
During a girls' night out, Mała advises Ewelina to let go of the past and enjoy life. The next day they go skating with Damian and the twins. Ewelina and Pauly get closer. After a fight with the girls, Wojtek and Ptyś destroy the door to the sleep room. Jacek comes to the house and says he is concerned about the recent aggressions between the team members. He sends the boys to work at a candy shop to make treats for the girls.
| 67 | 15 | "Episode 15" | 60 minutes | 19 June 2016 | N/A |
There is a wild party at a club with fans. The twins drink too much and have trouble waking up the next morning. The team rides in race cars. Wojtek and Ptyś help Damian dye his hair red. The girls have a contest with the lollipops the boys made.
| 68 | 16 | "Episode 16" | 60 minutes | 26 June 2016 | N/A |
The team hosts a costume party at the house. Damian has a lot of fun with a female guest. Ewelina's cat woman outfit makes a big impression on Wojtek. Ptyś destroys the wall of the sleep room. The next morning the team is shocked by the mess they made. Before going home there is a big clean up.

=== Series 6 (2016) ===
| No. overall | No. in season | Title | Duration | Original release date | Polish viewers (thousands) |
|---|---|---|---|---|---|
| 69 | 1 | "Episode 1" | 60 minutes | 28 August 2016 | 90 000 |
The team goes to Mielno for an unforgettable summer. On the way Damian tells his friends about his girlfriend Paulina. New members Ola and Piotr meet the rest of the group at the house. Jacek invites the team to his birthday party.
| 70 | 2 | "Episode 2" | 60 minutes | 4 September 2016 | N/A |
Everybody gets very drunk at the party. Ptyś tries to break up a fight between Ola and Mała on the way home. In the morning Piotr, Ola, Ptyś, and Klaudia start their job at a boating company. After work the rest of the team joins them on the beach. They take the inflatable banana for a ride in the sea.
| 71 | 3 | "Episode 3" | 60 minutes | 11 September 2016 | N/A |
The team goes to a Disco Polo night at the club. Piotr has a wardrobe malfunction. Damian is tempted by a beautiful woman, but decides to remain loyal to Paulina. The next day Wojtek and Damian beat Magda and Mała in a friendly competition at work.
| 72 | 4 | "Episode 4" | 60 minutes | 18 September 2016 | N/A |
Ola and Piotr take part in an initiation prepared by the rest of the group. Damian receives a surprise visit from Paulina. The team goes to a Western Fair where Magda lasts the longest on the mechanical bull. Later on the girls go to a very fancy restaurant while the boys work at a kebab stand.
| 73 | 5 | "Episode 5" | 60 minutes | 25 September 2016 | N/A |
Ola and Ptyś get closer during a night at the club. Klaudia reunites with an old friend. Damian has a fight with Paulina. Mała convinces him to apologize. He manages to stop Paulina from leaving the house. The team goes zip lining. With Piotr's help, Magda and Klaudia play a prank on Damian.
| 74 | 6 | "Episode 6" | 60 minutes | 2 October 2016 | N/A |
At the club Piotr takes a girl to the toilets. An argument between Klaudia and Damian turns into a big fight involving the entire group. Ola and Magda switch vehicles with Wojtek on the way home. Ptyś destroys the door to the boys' bedroom. Mała unsuccessfully tries to defuse tensions. Paulina leaves the house in tears. Damian decides to go with her to save their relationship. In the morning everyone feels remorseful about their behaviour. Klaudia decides to leave the show.
| 75 | 7 | "Episode 7" | 60 minutes | 9 October 2016 | 135 000 |
Wojtek runs into an ex-girlfriend at the club. Ptyś brings several fans back to the house. He wants to take them to the sleep room. Unfortunately, they are more interested in talking to Mała. Damian returns to the house with Paulina.
| 76 | 8 | "Episode 8" | 60 minutes | 16 October 2016 | N/A |
Piotr and Ptyś have a successful night. Magda is upset when she comes home to a wet bed. She has a fight with Piotr and the bedroom door suffers further damage. In the morning Jacek visits the house and orders Magda and Piotr to clean up. The rest of the team goes on a trip to a houseboat.
| 77 | 9 | "Episode 9" | 60 minutes | 23 October 2016 | N/A |
Młoda joins the team. Ola quickly bonds with the new girl. On the way home from a club, Magda and Młoda argue with Piotr. Wojtek and Ola try to calm them down. Damian invites Ptyś to a burger place. During lunch Ptyś gives Damian some relationship advice. Ola and Młoda spray paint the walls.
| 78 | 10 | "Episode 10" | 60 minutes | 30 October 2016 | N/A |
At the club Damian performs his signature dance move for the last time. Magda and Piotr spend the night in the sleep room. Ola and Młoda get into a fight, which entertains the other team members. Jacek is not pleased and tells them to sort out their differences politely.
| 79 | 11 | "Episode 11" | 60 minutes | 6 November 2016 | N/A |
Ptyś and Młoda get closer. The team works in pairs in a fun competition at a fast food place. At night buzzing insects disrupt everybody's sleep. The next day they take a trip to Gdynia. After exercising at a trampoline gym, they take a relaxing boat trip.
| 80 | 12 | "Episode 12" | 60 minutes | 13 November 2016 | N/A |
Ola and Mała are the winners of the fast food competition. Their reward is a helicopter ride. Magda and Piotr take a ride on a hang glider. The Kluk twins visit the house right in time for a party. Młoda is jealous when Ptyś's female friends talk to him. During the last night at the house, several members of the team get into fights. In the morning everybody reconciles before leaving.

=== Series 7 (2017) ===
| No. overall | No. in season | Title | Duration | Original release date | Polish viewers (thousands) |
|---|---|---|---|---|---|
| 81 | 1 | "Episode 1" | 60 minutes | 26 February 2017 | 122 363 |
The team boards a train headed to Zakopane. After Stifler's relationship ended, he became Piotr's roommate. Ptyś reveals that he has a girlfriend. Everybody loves the luxurious house. They also notice there is space for three more people. Klaudia, Alan, and Ewelina return to the show.
| 82 | 2 | "Episode 2" | 60 minutes | 5 March 2017 | 120 072 |
The team receives a visit from their new boss Michał. He teaches them about Goral culture and asks them to form two groups. The team with the most points will get a reward. Alan and Ptyś are chosen as leaders. During a ski trip, Ewelina injures her finger. Młoda and Klaudia go to work at a restaurant. The team goes to a club. Ewelina gets very drunk and fights with most of the team. Eventually Stifler calms her down.
| 83 | 3 | "Episode 3" | 60 minutes | 12 March 2017 | 114 752 |
The hungover team members don't remember much of the previous night. Michał has a serious talk with the group about their aggression. As punishment, Ewelina, Młoda, and Piotr have to clean a restaurant. At a club Magda runs into her ex-boyfriend.
| 84 | 4 | "Episode 4" | 60 minutes | 19 March 2017 | 133 300 |
Wojtek is still annoyed with Damian over his prank. The team goes snow tubing then receives skiing lessons. At the club Młoda fights with the other girls. Piotr acknowledges his feelings for Magda when they are in bed. Ewelina has to get creative to avoid an admirer. Młoda starts packing her bags.
| 85 | 5 | "Episode 5" | 60 minutes | 26 March 2017 | 132 777 |
Młoda tells the team she misses her boyfriend Jarek and will leave right away. Mała supports her while everyone else tries to change her mind. Eventually they accept her decision. Ewelina apologizes for their earlier fight. The next day, Ptyś's team decides to choose a new leader. Stifler wins the vote and leads his team to victory in a snow labyrinth competition.
| 86 | 6 | "Episode 6" | 60 minutes | 2 April 2017 | 125 119 |
Ptyś and Wojtek play a prank on the girls with Piotr's ice sculpture. Mała tries to get revenge with a bucket of snow. Alan's team wins in a difficult outdoor obstacle challenge. Wojtek and Alan find eggs in their beds. The team learns a Goral dance. Everyone has fun until Stifler is injured.
| 87 | 7 | "Episode 7" | 60 minutes | 9 April 2017 | 70 665 |
At the hospital Stifler is diagnosed with a sprained ankle and must wear a cast. The entire team comes together to care for him and lift his spirits. Somebody insults Klaudia at the club. Magda and Mała come to her defence. Piotr switches teams, to Alan's annoyance. The group goes to Kraków.
| 88 | 8 | "Episode 8" | 60 minutes | 16 April 2017 | 74 215 |
During a night out, Piotr accidentally spills juice on the entire team. Magda decides to break up with him. Meanwhile Stifler wants to sleep with his friend Marzena. Unfortunately, she disappoints him when he takes her to the house. Klaudia saves the day when the Maluch catches fire.
| 89 | 9 | "Episode 9" | 60 minutes | 23 April 2017 | 111 406 |
Klaudia learns that she will get a reward for her bravery. Stifler takes Marzena to a restaurant for a romantic dinner. The team visits a mine in Katowice, where they take part in a difficult challenge. Stifler and Ewelina stay behind at the bar. Ptyś reunites with his girlfriend Oliwia.
| 90 | 10 | "Episode 10" | 60 minutes | 7 May 2017 | 43 617 |
Ptyś does not want to be separated from Oliwia any longer. He decides to leave the team and tells them at the club. The other members are sad but supportive. Meanwhile Piotr has his last adventure in a club toilet. Back in Zakopane, Mała is unusually quiet and serious. She admits that she is in love and really misses her boyfriend. She has an emotional farewell with the team.
| 91 | 11 | "Episode 11" | 60 minutes | 14 May 2017 | 78 438 |
Piotr is annoyed when he fails a sobriety test and can't go skiing. Klaudia and Ewelina draw on Stifler's cast. A stand-up comedian visits the house. Klaudia gives her reward to Magda and Piotr. They rekindle their romance during the spa date.
| 92 | 12 | "Episode 12" | 60 minutes | 21 May 2017 | 77 943 |
Wojtek wakes up next to Marzena. Stifler politely tells her that their romance is over. The team hosts the last house party. Młoda and Ptyś come with Jarek and Oliwia. Alan wants to beat up Stifler after he threw a water balloon. Ptyś protects him, but becomes Alan's new target. Klaudia and Młoda prevent Stifler from getting involved. Magda and Piotr make a difficult decision about their relationship. The next morning the team reminisces about Winter Camp.

=== Series 8 (2017) ===
| No. overall | No. in season | Title | Duration | Original release date | Polish viewers (thousands) |
|---|---|---|---|---|---|
| 93 | 1 | "Episode 1" | 60 minutes | 3 September 2017 | N/A |
The team arrives in Władysławowo for the third summer camp. Stifler, Piotr, and Ewelina know that there will be new faces. Piotr's ex-girlfriend Jola surprises them at the beach. Eight new members arrive at the house, followed by Wojtek. Jacek the boss tells them that only a few of the new members will become permanent.
| 94 | 2 | "Episode 2" | 60 minutes | 10 September 2017 | N/A |
Ryjek's party tricks fail to impress the rest of the team. Jacek and Jola get into a big fight. The team has their first night out. Several of them get sick after drinking too much. Jola and Brzydal spend a lot of time in the sleep room. Ryjek feels unappreciated and leaves the house in the middle of the night. Jacek the boss visits for a serious talk.
| 95 | 3 | "Episode 3" | 60 minutes | 17 September 2017 | N/A |
Jacek and Jola receive a punishment for their aggressive behaviour. The veterans decide that Ilona will be the next to leave. Jacek tells the other boys about his special talent. Kamila tries to get Stifler's attention. Bartek and Ewelina have fun in the car, to Jacek's annoyance. Wojtek and Wiktoria go to the sleep room.
| 96 | 4 | "Episode 4" | 60 minutes | 24 September 2017 | N/A |
Kamila learns that she will be leaving. The team goes to a club in Łeba. Wojtek stays home to take care of Wiktoria, who is not feeling well. Ewelina takes Bartek to the toilets, where they are interrupted by Brzydal. Jola is very upset when Andzia kisses Piotr. The next day Andzia, Jola, Piotr, Brzydal and Ewelina go to work at a kebab stand.
| 97 | 5 | "Episode 5" | 60 minutes | 1 October 2017 | N/A |
The team is relieved to learn there won't be more eliminations. They go to a club in Sopot where Piotr and Jola rekindle their romance. Ewelina gives Brzydal some love advice. Wojtek is jealous when Wiktoria dances with Stifler. On the way home Jola is annoyed when Piotr falls asleep while Wojtek and Wiktoria have fun in the backseat. Jacek and Stifler deepen their friendship, leading to speculation among the rest of the team.
| 98 | 6 | "Episode 6" | 60 minutes | 8 October 2017 | N/A |
In the morning Jola regrets sleeping with Piotr. The team goes to a farm where they learn about ostrich eggs. Emotions run high at the club. Jola and Piotr get into a big fight after she kisses Stifler. Later she argues with Brzydal. Wojtek is furious after Jacek kisses a drunk Stifler. Jola decides to leave the house.
| 99 | 7 | "Episode 7" | 60 minutes | 15 October 2017 | N/A |
A difficult morning comes after the eventful night. Piotr learns about Jola's departure. Wojtek, Stifler, Ewelina, and Bartek go to work on the beach. On the way they discuss Stifler's sexuality. Wojtek apologizes to Jacek for his aggression. Jola returns to the house.
| 100 | 8 | "Episode 8" | 60 minutes | 22 October 2017 | N/A |
Mała returns to the team. While the veterans are all happy, there are mixed reactions from the new members. Jola, Jacek, Bartek, and Brzydal are excited, while Wiktoria and Andzia are not pleased. The team goes to a water park where Jacek and Stifler continue bonding. Jola is jealous when Mała befriends Brzydal. Stifler prepares a smelly prank for his friends.
| 101 | 9 | "Episode 9" | 60 minutes | 29 October 2017 | N/A |
Ewelina gets up close and personal with a few parrots. The team gets a lesson from their DJ friend. The boys put a horse statue in the girls' bedroom when they are not home. Bartek is annoyed when girls want to talk to Ewelina instead of him. Later he injures his leg on the dance floor.
| 102 | 10 | "Episode 10" | 60 minutes | 5 November 2017 | N/A |
Bartek learns that he fractured his leg. The team goes sightseeing in Gdańsk where they visit the famous Neptune fountain. Piotr faces his fear of snakes. Andzia decides to leave the team. The rest of the team finds her parting letter when they return from the club.
| 103 | 11 | "Episode 11" | 60 minutes | 12 November 2017 | N/A |
Mała and Ewelina decide to reconcile. The team comes home to a surprise: customized suitcases. Later they have a barbecue where Brzydal has trouble opening the champagne bottle. During a night out in Gdynia Stifler and Wojtek end up in a fountain.
| 104 | 12 | "Episode 12" | 60 minutes | 19 November 2017 | N/A |
Ptyś visits the house. The team prepares for the house party. Brzydal runs into a problem when Piotr kicks him out of the sleep room. Ewelina is jealous of Bartek's friend. Wiktoria and Wojtek decide to end their relationship. Ptyś realizes that his partying days are over.

=== Series 9 (2018) ===
| No. overall | No. in season | Title | Duration | Original release date | Polish viewers (thousands) |
|---|---|---|---|---|---|
| 105 | 1 | "Episode 1" | 60 minutes | 18 March 2018 | 105 923 |
The team attends the MTV EMA pre-party. Jacek the boss greets them with important news: the next day they will start a new season. Stifler meets Jacek and Wojtek, along with another guest: his dog Sherman. Everybody is excited to be returning to Warsaw. Stifler, Ewelina, Mała, and Wojtek reminisce about the first three seasons. During the first night out, Stifler and Jola get sick while Pedro occupies the sleep room.
| 106 | 2 | "Episode 2" | 60 minutes | 25 March 2018 | 57 728 |
Stifler asks the girls to look after Sherman. They decide to play a prank. The boys ride monster trucks. Mała and Brzydal get closer. At the club Jacek and Ewelina have a big fight. Jacek decides to leave the house, despite Jola's pleas for him to stay.
| 107 | 3 | "Episode 3" | 60 minutes | 8 April 2018 | 132 331 |
Mała kicks out a rude guest. Sherman's barking keeps the team up at night. Jola and Wojtek go to work at a clothing shop. Stifler and Sherman spend time with a dog trainer. During a night out Jola tries to make Piotr jealous while Mała and Brzydal have their first kiss.
| 108 | 4 | "Episode 4" | 60 minutes | 15 April 2018 | 90 870 |
Brzydal sets off firecrackers to wake up the other boys. Jacek returns to the house. The team goes to a club to celebrate Stifler's birthday. He requests a special present from his friends. Ewelina and Jacek reconcile when they go to work together. After a conversation with the boss, Stifler reluctantly agrees to take Sherman to a dog hotel.
| 109 | 5 | "Episode 5" | 60 minutes | 22 April 2018 | 123 102 |
Jacek's boyfriend surprises him at a club. Jola loses her temper. Mała is devastated after Ewelina insults her. She finds comfort in Brzydal's arms. The next day the boys meet Trybson for a workout session. Wojtek decides it is time for him to leave. He tells the team during an emotional dinner.
| 110 | 6 | "Episode 6" | 60 minutes | 6 May 2018 | 101 311 |
Tensions continue between Mała and the other girls. Jacek gets very drunk at the club. During a fight he pushes Wiktoria out of the car. Luckily the security guards catch her, preventing serious injury. Brzydal is less fortunate when Jola attacks him with her shoe. Mała takes him to the hospital with a bloody face. In the morning Jacek the boss announces that Jola and Jacek have been kicked out. Ewelina and Mała reconcile at work.
| 111 | 7 | "Episode 7" | 60 minutes | 13 May 2018 | 86 923 |
The team decides to cleanse the house of negative energy. Stifler and Piotr get an idea to lighten the mood. However, Brzydal is the one who impresses the girls. The team wakes up to find Ptyś making breakfast. He is shocked when they tell him about the recent events. Later on Alan also visits.
| 112 | 8 | "Episode 8" | 60 minutes | 20 May 2018 | 88 898 |
Wiktoria starts having feelings for Alan. Ptyś wakes up to a smelly surprise from the other boys. At the club Ewelina is smitten with a Spanish man. Alan ends up in the sleep room with Piotr's friend. In the morning he regrets it.
| 113 | 9 | "Episode 9" | 60 minutes | 27 May 2018 | 114 472 |
Ptyś and Stifler visit Sherman, who is very happy at the dog hotel. Wiktoria and Alan bond during a game of pool. Brzydal prepares a romantic surprise for Mała. Ewelina has a big argument with Stifler. She decides to leave the house.
| 114 | 10 | "Episode 10" | 60 minutes | 3 June 2018 | 110 899 |
In the morning Stifler is remorseful about what he said. Wiktoria is in her element when the team goes rollerskating. Stifler apologizes to Ewelina. She accepts and agrees to return to the house. At the club Wiktoria gets very drunk and comes onto Alan. He gently turns her down, which really upsets her.
| 115 | 11 | "Episode 11" | 60 minutes | 10 June 2018 | 77 860 |
Ryjek visits the house. He enjoys himself until he accidentally gets stuck in a table. Stifler and Alan come to his rescue. Wiktoria leaves the house. During the house party Mała and Brzydal sleep together. Ewelina gets a surprise visitor.
| 116 | 12 | "Episode 12" | 60 minutes | 17 June 2018 | 81 324 |
Pedro sets a new record. Stifler is delighted when Sherman returns to the house. The veterans congratulate Brzydal on staying and being a great team member. Jacek the boss reminds Ewelina and Stifler about their punishment. He also has one more surprise: instead of going home, the team will have a vacation in Tenerife.

=== Series 10 (2018-2019) ===
| No. overall | No. in season | Title | Duration | Original release date | Polish viewers (thousands) |
|---|---|---|---|---|---|
| 117 | 1 | "Episode 1" | 60 minutes | 21 October 2018 | N/A |
The team arrives at the house in Łeba. Brzydal and Mała have broken up, but remain close friends. To celebrate the tenth season, there are murals featuring past and present cast members. Three new members join them: Julia, Patryk "Spiker", and Filip. From the very beginning Julia does not get along with the other girls. On the way to a club, a fight breaks out in their car. As a result, Spiker switches vehicles with Julia when they stop.
| 118 | 2 | "Episode 2" | 60 minutes | 28 October 2018 | N/A |
Pedro and Brzydal make every effort to reconcile Julia with the rest of the girls. Klaudia approaches Filip, who does not remember her. The next morning the team meets their new boss, who will be... Trybson. The team will be working at their own bar. Meanwhile, Ptyś and Wiktoria visit the house.
| 119 | 3 | "Episode 3" | 60 minutes | 4 November 2018 | N/A |
On the way to a club, Pedro tells his friends the details of his relationship with Laura. During the party, Ewelina, Wiktoria and Stifler organize a competition to check who has the deepest throat. Ewelina and Spiker deepen their friendship. Klaudia lands in bed with Filip while Jakub triggers a "ham" scandal.
| 120 | 4 | "Episode 4" | 60 minutes | 11 November 2018 | N/A |
The big flamingo pulls the team out to the lake. However, a catamaran cruise on the sea is more conductive to fun. Spiker as a stylist agrees with Ewelina's taste. The elections of Miss Łeba arouse euphoria, which falls only in the bed.
| 121 | 5 | "Episode 5" | 60 minutes | 18 November 2018 | N/A |
Alan arrives at the house. He reconnects with Mała during an evening at the club. Klaudia is annoyed when Filip takes a girl to the toilets. Meanwhile, Spiker gets closer with the girls and Ewelina fights with an anti fan.
| 122 | 6 | "Episode 6" | 60 minutes | 25 November 2018 | N/A |
Pedro is worried about Stifler and decides to take him to the fortune-teller. The visit puts Stifler in a good mood, but fails to change his attitude toward a healthy lifestyle. The team decides to spend the evening together at home. Meanwhile, another joke of Brzydal unleashes the true male war between him and Alan.
| 123 | 7 | "Episode 7" | 60 minutes | 2 December 2018 | N/A |
Młoda and Ola visit the house. The men are very fascinated with Ola's new appearance. At the bar, the team prepares a birthday surprise for Alan. Młoda gets into a fight with the group. She decides it is best for everyone if she leaves for good.
| 124 | 8 | "Episode 8" | 60 minutes | 9 December 2018 | N/A |
After Alan’s birthday party, a hard morning comes. Trybson decides to arrange a talk with the group. The team arrives at the medieval village. They learn how the Slavs played well before the invention of the Internet. In the evening, the crew goes camping. Stifler learns that baking a chicken over a fire is not a simple task. Julia and Brzydal, who join the others after work, decide to play a prank. They dress up as bloody clowns.
| 125 | 9 | "Episode 9" | 60 minutes | 16 December 2018 | N/A |
Wojtek visits the house and decides to play a prank on Stifler. For this purpose, he puts alcohol in a watermelon. Afterwards, the team takes part in a maze race. In the evening they go to a party. At the club, they are greeted by the girlfriends of Pedro and Brzydal. Wojtek loses his companions to alcohol.
| 126 | 10 | "Episode 10" | 60 minutes | 6 January 2019 | N/A |
Julia receives devastating news from home and leaves right away. Later on Klaudia "Czaja" arrives at the house. Brzydal is sad when his girlfriend Angela has to go home. Stifler decides it's time to let loose during a night out. However, drinking a lot does not make him feel better. He gets into a fight with Ewelina, who is disappointed when Mała sides with Stifler.
| 127 | 11 | "Episode 11" | 60 minutes | 13 January 2019 | N/A |
Brzydal misses Angela and feels lonely. He decides to leave the team. Kamila and Bartek visit the house. The group takes a trip on a fishing boat in Gdynia. At the club there is a lot of alcohol. During a fight with Klaudia, Alan's behaviour shocks the rest of the group.
| 128 | 12 | "Episode 12" | 60 minutes | 20 January 2019 | N/A |
Trybson comes to the house to discuss the events of the previous night. While he is disappointed in Alan, it's up to the team whether they give him another chance or ask him to leave. They unanimously decide that he should be kicked out. The decision was based not only on recent events, but also his actions during previous seasons. Kamila, who has gotten close to Alan, decides to leave with him. Piotr Kluk visits the house. Before everyone goes home, there is a final party at the house.

=== Series 11 (2019) ===
| No. overall | No. in season | Title | Duration | Original release date | Polish viewers (thousands) |
|---|---|---|---|---|---|
| 129 | 1 | "Episode 1" | 60 minutes | 24 March 2019 | 65 839 |
The cast members return to Warsaw. Stifler has a new appearance and promises to enjoy himself. Ewa, Don Kasjo, and Damian "Dzik" join the team. The final new member is Anastasiya, who immediately connects with Stifler. Later on she offends the other girls. Klaudia has enough and spills her drink on Anastasiya.
| 130 | 2 | "Episode 2" | 60 minutes | 31 March 2019 | 125 084 |
Don Kasjo and Ewa share an intimate moment. Mała takes care of Stifler while he is drunk, making Anastasiya very jealous. Tensions come to a boil between her and Ewelina. In the morning a remorseful Anastasiya reconciles with the group. Jacek welcomes the new members and reminds everybody of the rules. Czaja returns to the team and immediately catches Dzik's eye.
| 131 | 3 | "Episode 3" | 60 minutes | 7 April 2019 | 118 713 |
On the way home, Dzik's behaviour shocks the girls. He is ashamed when he sobers up. However, the situation greatly improves Anastasiya and Ewelina's relationship. Klaudia and Don Kasjo team up to play a prank. Jacek says that Anastasiya will choose Dzik's punishment. Spiker helps execute her entertaining plan.
| 132 | 4 | "Episode 4" | 60 minutes | 14 April 2019 | 80 220 |
Love is in the air at the house. Mała and Pedro end up in bed after a wild night. Stifler takes Anastasiya on a romantic date. Dzik and Czaja continue getting closer while working in a restaurant. Meanwhile, the team has an underwater photo shoot.
| 133 | 5 | "Episode 5" | 60 minutes | 21 April 2019 | 51 212 |
Don Kasjo and Dzik put Klaudia's mattress in the pool while she is half asleep. In the morning Dzik and Don Kasjo are too drunk to go to work, while Pedro and Klaudia are too sleepy to replace them. The team goes to a trampoline park. That night Anastasiya and Stifler take the next step in their relationship.
| 134 | 6 | "Episode 6" | 60 minutes | 5 May 2019 | 87 537 |
Czaja flirts with a Turkish man at the club. The team continues the party back at the house. Ewa and Klaudia come to Czaja's defence when her guest becomes aggressive. Things get heated in the pool. Spiker bonds with Don Kasjo during a skating competition.
| 135 | 7 | "Episode 7" | 60 minutes | 12 May 2019 | 52 145 |
Don Kasjo is annoyed after Dzik accidentally breaks his teeth. At the club the team meets up with their Norwegian friends. Ewelina's search for romance does not go as planned. Mała and Ewa have a hard day of work at a car wash. A remorseful Dzik arranges a dentist visit for Don Kasjo.
| 136 | 8 | "Episode 8" | 60 minutes | 19 May 2019 | 63 440 |
The group has a wild night at a club. Ewa gets into a fight when she overhears somebody insulting her. Don Kasjo has an unexpected admirer. While working a hair salon, Spiker gets a makeover. The girls learn about the time of the dinosaurs. Czaja and Anastasiya have an argument. A surprise guest comes to the house. Ola visits the team.
| 137 | 9 | "Episode 9" | 60 minutes | 26 May 2019 | 68 261 |
The team has a wild house party. Klaudia gets revenge on an aggressive guest. Ewa argues with an ex-boyfriend. In the morning Don Kasjo plays a prank on Dzik. The group goes bungee jumping. Stifler and Anastasiya have fun in the pool.
| 138 | 10 | "Episode 10" | 60 minutes | 2 June 2019 | 76 765 |
At the costume party, Stifler talks with a female fan. This causes his first disagreement with Anastasiya. Ewelina and Spiker misbehave after having too many drinks. The next day the team takes a trip to Zegrze. They witness a rescue on the frozen lake before taking a swim themselves. Back in Warsaw, the boys get dressed up for a special performance.
| 139 | 11 | "Episode 11" | 60 minutes | 9 June 2019 | 159 112 |
Ewa, Ewelina, and Czaja play a prank. The boys come home to find the door blocked and their bags packed. The group goes to a bowling alley where Spiker and Czaja have the best luck. Anastasiya shares some tricks with Stifler. Don Kasjo starts to become jealous of their relationship and acts out. He ends up having a big fight with most of the team. Klaudia manages to calm him down.
| 140 | 12 | "Episode 12" | 60 minutes | 16 June 2019 | 80 183 |
Emotions run high during the team's final night out. Don Kasjo defends the girls from an anti-fan. Piotr tries to seduce Ewa without success. Stifler breaks up a fight on the way home. Ewelina comforts Ewa when Piotr's behaviour upsets her. Dzik and Spiker get sick from drinking too much. The next day Stifler and Anastasiya get tattoos together. Jacek has one more surprise: before everyone goes home, they will attend two parties.
| 141 | 13 | "Episode 13" | 60 minutes | 24 June 2019 (Player.pl) | N/A |
The team travels to Poznań for their club events. At the first party, Mała and Klaudia are interested in the same man. Ptyś and his girlfriend Oliwia have dinner with Stifler and Anastasiya. Wojtek surprises the group at their second party.

=== Series 12 (2019) ===
| No. overall | No. in season | Title | Original release date | Viewers (millions) |
|---|---|---|---|---|
| 142 | 1 | "Episode 1" | 22 September 2019 | TBA |
The team arrives in Mielno. Newly single Anastasiya has an awkward reunion with Stifler, who leaves for a body building competition. Ewelina's friends approve of her new figure. Jacek says they will be visited by potential new members. Asia and Paweł come soon after. That evening Hungarian celebrity Gabo arrives and makes a big impression on the girls.
| 143 | 2 | "Episode 2" | 29 September 2019 | TBA |
The team has an eventful first night out. Anastasiya and Asia become good friends. Paweł gets very sick after drinking too much. Ewa is annoyed when Dzik dances with another woman right after kissing her. Ewelina is conflicted about her attraction to Gabo. Stifler returns to the team.
| 144 | 3 | "Episode 3" | 6 October 2019 | TBA |
During a night out, Gabo is in a bad mood until Mała and Spiker save the day. Stifler is too tired to party after his travels. Don Kasjo is the victor of a competition held by the girls. The team goes paint balling. Jacek tells the team that Asia and Paweł will be leaving.
| 145 | 4 | "Episode 4" | 20 October 2019 | TBA |
Ewelina has an accident. Two newcomers arrive at the house. Diva quickly befriends the entire team. Pedro bonds with Anna at the club. Dzik's jealousy goes too far, leaving Ewa in tears. Mała's attempt to resolve their quarrel backfires. Gabo tries to figure out who stole his food.
| 146 | 5 | "Episode 5" | 27 October 2019 | TBA |
The team goes to a western fair in Kołobrzeg, where Anna impresses the team while horseback riding. Gabo invites Mała on a friendly date. Don Kasjo and Diva have an argument at the club, while Gabo has trouble communicating. Back at the house, the girls catch Dzik and Pedro with women. Anastasiya loses her temper when she learns the sleep room is occupied.
| 147 | 6 | "Episode 6" | 3 November 2019 | TBA |
Diva and Ewelina receive a difficult and smelly punishment for their laziness. Spiker and Mała awake to a chicken in their bedroom. Dzik impresses the other boys at the gym. Don Kasjo and Pedro decide to play a prank. The team receives a visit from singer Miły Pan. Anastasiya and Anna bond during a night out.
| 148 | 7 | "Episode 7" | 10 November 2019 | TBA |
The girls argue on the way home. The conflict escalates at the house where Ewelina violently confronts Anna. Mała and Ewa side with Ewelina, while Anna finds support from Anastasiya. Don Kasjo has a successful night. He celebrates by teaming up with Pedro to play a prank. Spiker tries to educate Gabo about Polish food.
| 149 | 8 | "Episode 8" | 17 November 2019 | TBA |
Jacek informs the group that Anna and Diva will stay. He also says there will be a new visitor. Don Kasjo's friend Sasha arrives at the house. Ptyś visits the house and notices that Stifler has changed. They have a serious conversation about his future with the team.
| 150 | 9 | "Episode 9" | 24 November 2019 | TBA |
Stifler invites the team to dinner, where he tells them he is leaving. They are shocked, but accept his decision. Gabo and Sasha have a great night at the club, while Anastasiya is sad about Stifler's departure. Diva and Don Kasjo bond on the dance floor. Pedro invites a girl to the team's amusement park trip.
| 151 | 10 | "Episode 10" | 1 December 2019 | TBA |
At a party Dzik only has eyes for Ewa. She makes it clear that their romance is over. Mała and Ewelina drink too many kamikazes. Don Kasjo defends Diva from anti-fans. Ewelina is not pleased to find Anastasiya sleeping in her bed. The team rides race cars in Koszalin. Dzik and Don Kasjo host a silly contest, complete with a unique trophy.
| 152 | 11 | "Episode 11" | 8 December 2019 | TBA |
Emotions run high during a night out. Gabo flirts with Ewa and Dzik insults her. Don Kasjo tries to give him advice. Dzik decides it is best to leave the team. Mała finds the situation amusing, which causes a fight with Ewa and Ewelina. In the morning, everybody resolves their quarrels. However, Mała decides it is time for her to leave. She has an emotional farewell with her friends. The team's spirits are lifted when Wojtek visits them.
| 153 | 12 | "Episode 12" | 15 December 2019 | TBA |
At the club, Anna's talents impress Wojtek. Don Kasjo is still sad about Dzik leaving. After Ewa rejects Gabo, he rekindles a romance from the gym. Asia and Paweł come to the house party. One guest insults Asia, which leads to a big fight. Sasha argues with Anastasiya. Spiker and Diva go to bed early. Pedro and Anna have accidents and go to the hospital.
| 154 | 13 | "Episode 13" | 22 December 2019 (Player.pl) | TBA |
The team reunites in Warsaw. Gabo gives them a special welcome. Jacek informs them that he chose which of their visitors will become permanent. Asia and Diva are the lucky ones. The team goes to a party, where Ewa and Gabo deepen their friendship. The next day Ewelina invites the team to watch her take part in a wrestling match.

=== Series 13 (2020) ===
| No. overall | No. in season | Title | Original release date | Viewers (millions) |
|---|---|---|---|---|
| 155 | 1 | "Episode 1" | 6 September 2020 | TBA |
The team reunites in Warsaw. Dzik returns to the show, to the delight of his friends. New members Marceli and Milena meet them at the house. The partying starts right away. Asia and Gabo look after Milena when she drinks too much. Don Kasjo and Asia share a kiss.
| 156 | 2 | "Episode 2" | 9 September 2020 | TBA |
At the club Spiker gets very drunk and starts an "ice fight." Anastasiya tries to get Don Kasjo's attention. However, he only has eyes for Asia. She is sad until Gabo comes to the rescue. The next morning, Jacek sends the team to their first attraction: a unique Escape Room.
| 157 | 3 | "Episode 3" | 13 September 2020 | TBA |
Ewelina and Marceli bond during a night out. Asia and Don Kasjo have a fight after he flirts with another woman. The argument continues at the house, leaving Asia in tears. Milena comforts her and gives advice. The next day Ewelina, Diva, and Spiker go to work for a dog groomer.
| 158 | 4 | "Episode 4" | 16 September 2020 | TBA |
Marceli's moonshine receives a mixed reception from the team. Anastasiya gets into a fight during a night out. Back at the house, Dzik and Don Kasjo have an argument. The party continues in the pool. Anastasiya, Ewa, and Ewelina team up to play a prank on the boys. One guest stays the night.
| 159 | 5 | "Episode 5" | 20 September 2020 | TBA |
A bungee jumping attraction comes to the Warsaw Shore house. Asia and Don Kasjo are forced to go to work together at a restaurant. During a night out, Ewa and Dzik reconcile while Milena and Gabo deepen their friendship. Marceli dances with Anastasiya, which causes a disagreement between him and Diva.
| 160 | 6 | "Episode 6" | 23 September 2020 | TBA |
After a long night, the team is waken up early for aqua-fit training. Ewa, Gabo, and Marceli have a hard work day at the hardware store. During a zoo visit, Don Kasjo is afraid of the small animals. Anastasiya is in her element on a group date at a fancy restaurant. Ewa and Ewelina host a spontaneous house party.
| 161 | 7 | "Episode 7" | 27 September 2020 | TBA |
Milena runs into trouble while zip lining. Gabo's appetite makes a big impression on the team. Anastasiya celebrates her birthday at a club in Kielce. Meanwhile, Ewelina is very jealous when Marceli kisses another woman. She decides to have fun with Gabo. Asia and Ewa have a fight.
| 162 | 8 | "Episode 8" | 30 September 2020 | TBA |
Dzik shows off his fighting skills in a Sumo match. The girls have a serious conversation about what happened the previous night. Jacek is disappointed about the team's recent aggression. Anastasiya and Gabo spend an evening at home. They decide to play a prank. Milena is too drunk to go to the party. Later she wakes up in a pile of mattresses. A romantic gesture from Don Kasjo rekindles his romance with Asia.
| 163 | 9 | "Episode 9" | 4 October 2020 | TBA |
Anastasiya receives a helicopter ride as a birthday present. She asks Diva to accompany her. Marceli takes Ewelina out on a romantic date. The team gets creative during a night out. Milena meets up with her friends and introduces them to Asia. Back at the house, Ewelina and Marceli spend the night in the sleep room.
| 164 | 10 | "Episode 10" | 7 October 2020 | TBA |
The team goes roller skating. Asia and Pedro play a prank on Don Kasjo while he is sleeping. The boys attend a ballet class. At a costume party, Milena gets closer with Don Kasjo. Gabo's night out goes wrong and he ends up in the hospital.
| 165 | 11 | "Episode 11" | 11 October 2020 | TBA |
The team receives a special visitor: Nathan from Geordie Shore. Diva and Anastasiya are very interested in their English guest. Later, Ewa catches Spiker in bed with Nathan. Marceli and Ewelina spend a night at the house while the rest of the team goes to a party.
| 166 | 12 | "Episode 12" | 14 October 2020 | TBA |
After a fight with Nathan, Anastasiya avoids the team. However, everybody reconciles before a big house party. Several guests from past seasons come. Ptyś brings several friends. Bartek and Anna Tokarska have fallen in love and gotten engaged. Alan immediately befriends Nathan. Anastasiya and Ewelina have a fight. Ewa defends Ewelina.
| 167 | 13 | "Episode 13" | 14 October 2020 (Player.pl) | TBA |
The team reunites in Poznań to support Dzik in a competition. Marceli and Ewelina have moved in together. However, she believes Dzik is trying to ruin their relationship. At the event, former members Ptyś, Trybson, Eliza, Julia, Filip, Wojtek, and Stifler join them. Ewelina supports Dzik's opponent. After losing, he publicly insults her. Most of the team is disappointed in Dzik. However, Don Kasjo stays loyal to his best friend. Ewelina leaves the hotel the team is staying at. Before leaving Poznań, she meets Marceli for a serious discussion.

=== Series 14 (2020-2021) ===
| No. overall | No. in season | Title | Original release date | Viewers (millions) |
|---|---|---|---|---|
| 168 | 1 | "Episode 1" | 15 November 2020 | TBA |
The team arrives at the house, which looks very different. After the previous season, Ewelina left Marceli and reconciled with Dzik. New members Kinga and Maciek make a big impression on the entire team. Ptyś visits and announces that he is their new boss. Milena and Kinga have a fight after drinking too much.
| 169 | 2 | "Episode 2" | 22 November 2020 | TBA |
On the way to the club, Kinga flirts with Dzik. Ewa is jealous when she sees Ewelina talking to Maciek. Tensions come to a boil between the two girls. Pedro sleepwalks at night, causing a funny situation with Ewa and Diva. The next day Paulina arrives at the house. However, everyone is still recovering from the events of the previous night.
| 170 | 3 | "Episode 3" | 29 November 2020 | TBA |
As punishment, Milena and Kinga have to clean while the rest of the team has fun at the beach. Ptyś comes to give warnings and tell them about an upcoming attraction. Arnold arrives at the house. At the club Ewa and Maciek get closer, while Pedro misses his girlfriend.
| 171 | 4 | "Episode 4" | 6 December 2020 | TBA |
After a long night, Dzik wakes up outside. Ewa stays home with him while the rest of the team goes skydiving. Spiker and Paulina have the best luck while wake boarding. Ewelina and Arnold disappear together during a night out, leading to speculation among their friends. Pedro's girlfriend Laura surprises him.
| 172 | 5 | "Episode 5" | 13 December 2020 | TBA |
Pedro informs his friends that he will be leaving the team. Maciek considers leaving as well after a fight with Asia. However, he decides to stay. Ewa and Ewelina reconcile. After working at a barber shop with Spiker and Diva, Don Kasjo returns with a new hair style. Paulina leaves the show after seriously injuring her leg.
| 173 | 6 | "Episode 6" | 20 December 2020 | TBA |
Dzik's jealousy leads to another disagreement with Ewa. Don Kasjo and Maciek also have a fight. In the morning, Ptyś has a serious talk with the team. Ewelina and Arnold continue getting closer when they go to work together. The team goes on a camping trip.
| 174 | 7 | "Episode 7" | 27 December 2020 | TBA |
Love is in the air by the campfire. Kinga and Dzik end up in a tent together. Ewelina and Arnold share a kiss, while Ewa and Maciek finally get a chance to bond. Everybody is in a good mood until Ewa goes too far during a game. In the morning, Asia confides in Ewelina about what happened the previous night.
| 175 | 8 | "Episode 8" | 3 January 2021 | TBA |
A snake shows up at the house. While most of the team is scared, Kinga befriends their surprise guest. Ewelina confronts Spiker and Diva about their gossiping. Things get heated at the club. Maciek defends Diva when a fan offends him.
| 176 | 9 | "Episode 9" | 10 January 2021 | TBA |
Maciek gets very drunk during a party. Dzik gets very upset when Ewa refuses to rekindle their romance. Most of the team is amused, but Kinga feels sorry for him. The next morning new team member Michał arrives at the house.
| 177 | 10 | "Episode 10" | 17 January 2021 | TBA |
The team goes for a ride on electric bicycles. The fun ends when Milena and Asia have a collision. Michał unintentionally offends Diva and Milena. However, all is forgiven during a night at the club. Spiker and Ewa show off their talents while working at the car wash.
| 178 | 11 | "Episode 11" | 24 January 2021 | TBA |
Kinga is very jealous when Dzik flirts with another woman. Ewa and Ewelina resolve their feud. Don Kasjo arranges a romantic night in the sleep room for Ewa and Maciek. The team has a day of fun and pranks at the water park.
| 179 | 12 | "Episode 12" | 31 January 2021 | TBA |
The team hosts a large outdoor party to end the season. Maciek and Ewa decide to end their relationship. In the morning Arnold plays a prank on his sleeping roommates. Dzik apologizes to Kinga and they decide to be friends.
| – | – | "Extra" | 7 February 2021 (Player.pl) | TBA |
The team reminisces about the season and shares some unaired moments.

=== Series 15 (2021) ===
| No. overall | No. in season | Title | Original release date | Viewers (millions) |
|---|---|---|---|---|
| 180 | 1 | "Episode 1" | 28 March 2021 | TBA |
Six new team members arrive at the house. The party starts right away. Lena gets very drunk and tries to kiss Kamil. However, he is more interested in Oliwia. The current team is surprised by their new houseguests. Maciek is happy to reunite with his friend Dominik.
| 181 | 2 | "Episode 2" | 4 April 2021 | TBA |
The team receives a video call from Ewelina and Arnold. Ptyś reminds everybody that clubs are closed due to the pandemic. Therefore, all parties will take place at the house. Don Kasjo flirts with Patrycja. Dominik helps Milena and Diva when they find Kamil sleeping in their bed.
| 182 | 3 | "Episode 3" | 11 April 2021 | TBA |
Everyone is happy when Spiker arrives at the house. Kamil and Dominik impress during an art lesson. The team's cook participates at their party that evening. Jez and Lena have a disagreement. After another argument, Lena questions if she should go home.
| 183 | 4 | "Episode 4" | 18 April 2021 | TBA |
Diva convinces Lena to stay. Later she reconciles with Maciek. In the morning, Ptyś informs the team that their cook needs a day off. Therefore, Patrycja and Don Kasjo are in charge of the kitchen. The team receives a visit from the fortune teller.
| 184 | 5 | "Episode 5" | 25 April 2021 | TBA |
Oliwia flirts with a handsome singer. Jez gets very drunk and makes a mess in the bedroom. Diva and Maciek celebrate their birthdays. Ewa, Milena, Spiker, and Patrycja prepare a special cake for them. Dominik helps the girls with their presents.
| 185 | 6 | "Episode 6" | 9 May 2021 | TBA |
The birthday party for Diva and Maciek is a huge success. Oliwia and Dominik have a disagreement about Maciek's present. Kamil and Kinga get closer. Patrycja helps Don Kasjo after he drinks too much. The next day the team rides in monster trucks.
| 186 | 7 | "Episode 7" | 16 May 2021 | TBA |
Pole dancing stimulates the senses and creates new acquaintances. Pedro comes to visit, longing for team events. Dzik makes an important decision - his longing for his beloved is stronger than the will to play. Dominik goes too far when arguing with a guest. When confronted, he refuses to listen to the team. A distraught Kinga decides to contact Ptyś.
| 187 | 8 | "Episode 8" | 23 May 2021 | TBA |
It turns out that Dzik's departure is not the end of goodbyes. Ptyś asks Dominik to leave the team. There are also returns, but not everyone is happy to see Alan. This day shows who is really in shape. Kamil excels during the football game. In the evening, Oliwia flirts with Alan.
| 188 | 9 | "Episode 9" | 30 May 2021 | TBA |
The gossip turns into a conspiracy when Ewa reconciles with Alan. As the emotions subside, the boys form a "pot team". Horseback riding is only a warm-up. Jez helps the cook prepare a special drink for the crew's sleigh ride. A ceramics lesson reveals hidden talents.
| 189 | 10 | "Episode 10" | 6 June 2021 | TBA |
Buongiorno! Michał wakes up the crew after an all-night party. While everyone else takes part in the total demolition, Alan and Oliwia enjoy a romantic afternoon. In the evening, Spiker and Patrycja have a disagreement during a singing lesson. Sequins reign supreme when Sławomir comes to visit.
| 190 | 11 | "Episode 11" | 13 June 2021 | TBA |
Michał and Lena have a friendly competition during training. That evening the team visits a casino. Ewelona and Arnold pay a visit to check on their friends. Eventually Kasjo and Patrycja come to an agreement in the bedroom. Alan and Oliwia also strengthen their friendship.
| 191 | 12 | "Episode 12" | 20 June 2021 | TBA |
It's time for the last house party. There are guests including Julia and Don Kasjo's brother. While Don Kasjo hosts an unusual competition, Patrycja bonds with Lena. A cold swim cures the crew's morning hangover. That evening a farewell dinner takes place in the atmosphere of memories of the winter season.
| – | – | "Extra" | 27 June 2021 | TBA |
Cast members look back at Series 15.

=== Series 16 (2021) ===
| No. overall | No. in season | Title | Original release date | Viewers (millions) |
|---|---|---|---|---|
| 192 | 1 | "Episode 1" | 19 September 2021 | TBA |
The team arrives in Łeba. Don Kasjo's special entrance does not impress Patrycja. New member Sarna immediately gets the girls' attention. Ewelina and Arnold reunite with their friends. Ptyś stops by and tells stories of series 4. The party continues at the beach.
| 193 | 2 | "Episode 2" | 26 September 2021 | TBA |
Diva arrives right in time for the first club event. Lena is devastated when she hears Kamil may have a bet involving her. Sarna expects to have a successful night. However, it is Jez who connects with many women. Kamil and Patrycja go to the sleep room, causing an argument.
| 194 | 3 | "Episode 3" | 3 October 2021 | TBA |
The team's first activity is horseback riding. Oliwia, Patrycja, and Sarna come up with a plan while working at the stables. Before the "Panty Conquerors" enter battle, the team conquers a colourful event. Kamil notices a threat in Sarna, who is Lena's target at the club.
| 195 | 4 | "Episode 4" | 10 October 2021 | TBA |
There is a conflict between Kamil and Jez. Don Kasjo helps resolve their differences and becomes the reigning "Panty Conqueror". Milena is too tired to go to work. Diva and Spiker prepare surprises for the weddings of summer camp.
| 196 | 5 | "Episode 5" | 17 October 2021 | TBA |
Pedro and his friend Mikołaj join the team for the weddings. A grand celebration takes place at the villa. During the after party, Mikołaj's behaviour annoys the team. Thanks to the help of a wingman, Kamil has a very successful night.
| 197 | 6 | "Episode 6" | 24 October 2021 | TBA |
Arnold breaks up a fight between Milena and Kamil. Diva impresses while working at the fish market. Back at the house, the "pot team" makes a loud return. The group goes to an amusement park. As punishment for her laziness, Milena has to clean the whole house.
| 198 | 7 | "Episode 7" | 31 October 2021 | TBA |
Sarna, Jez, and Kamil form an alliance. In a sparkling clean house, the "Three Musketeers" do their best to impress their goddesses. Spiker's guest tries to impress Milena. The team takes a trip to Charbrowo. They discover that farm life is not only idyllic, but also an exciting race.
| 199 | 8 | "Episode 8" | 7 November 2021 | TBA |
The team creates a movie. Don Kasjo gives advice to Sarna before a night out. At the club, Milena fights with an aggressive guest while Lena is jealous of Sarna's success. An intimate moment between Spiker and Kamil creates a big drama.
| 200 | 9 | "Episode 9" | 21 November 2021 | TBA |
The level of adrenaline rises when the team goes parachuting. Afterwards, they relax on a luxury catamaran cruise. Patrycja meets a faithful admirer at the club in Gdańsk. Jez and Kamil have a successful night after resolving their latest quarrel.
| 201 | 10 | "Episode 10" | 28 November 2021 | TBA |
Kayaks awaken the spirit of competition. Dzik's unexpected visit sends the team to a double party! Sarna is better at picking up than apologizing, while Kamil struggles to resist Lena.
| 202 | 11 | "Episode 11" | 5 December 2021 | TBA |
A quick morning training starts a new day! The flyboard is not an easy challenge, but it is harder for the crew to understand Don Kasjo's disappearance.
| 203 | 12 | "Episode 12" | 12 December 2021 | TBA |
Self defense secrets can be useful, but not everyone sees the point in cleaning a cutter. Memorial tattoos turn out to be a cure for pain. The Four Aces take the reins during the last night!
| – | – | "Extra" | 12 December 2021 | TBA |

=== Series 17 (2022) ===
| No. overall | No. in season | Title | Original release date | Viewers (millions) |
|---|---|---|---|---|
| 204 | 1 | "Episode 1" | 18 September 2022 | TBA |
On the way to the villa, emotions run high. The crew has a good feeling. There are five freshmen waiting at the venue! The roe deer finally joins the large group. A house near Wrocław has barely survived.
| 205 | 2 | "Episode 2" | 25 September 2022 | TBA |
The team is in a bubbly mood at their first party. The start of the season is not the only cause for celebration. The day after the melange is full of activity.
| 206 | 3 | "Episode 3" | 2 October 2022 | TBA |
Some are lazing around, others are cleaning. The dance cleaning service doesn't just have a good nose: as soon as Kamil shows up, the team takes an interest in Ola. Did Lena get discouraged? It's time to find out.
| 207 | 4 | "Episode 4" | 9 October 2022 | TBA |
Kamil's pranks lead to team tensions and yellow cards. A true lumberjack is not afraid of the axe. A shower for two is much more enjoyable than a dip in the pool, which results in testicular injuries.
| 208 | 5 | "Episode 5" | 16 October 2022 | TBA |
Jealousy can be dealt with at a distance, but in the fight for the sake of a friend, Jez prefers to spice it up with a worthy "dill". Serious talks are waiting for the team.
| 209 | 6 | "Episode 6" | 23 October 2022 | TBA |
A successful event brings new acquaintances. Kamil and Sarna fight for the favors of beautiful women, and Lena faces a love dilemma.
| 210 | 7 | "Episode 7" | 30 October 2022 | TBA |
When it's time for a house party, the villa comes to life. Alan will work with Olivia as an imam and Wictoria will face a test of loyalty. The announcer begins his own choreography, Lena experiences her drama, and Jez suddenly disappears.
| 211 | 8 | "Episode 8" | 6 November 2022 | TBA |
The male cats are loaded with rifles and ready for action! The ropes course will prove to be a challenge, and a test of knowledge and royal magic awaits the crew at the beach bar.
| 212 | 9 | "Episode 9" | 20 November 2022 | TBA |
Only a few can overcome fear and jump for dreams, but the whole team in crazy costumes is going to the party! It pays to be nice: Sequento wins Milena's heart.
| 213 | 10 | "Episode 10" | 27 November 2022 | TBA |
The team makes it all the way to the Czech Republic, where daydreaming takes on literal meaning. Dense environment and more yellow cards.
| 214 | 11 | "Episode 11" | 4 December 2022 | TBA |
| 215 | 12 | "Episode 12" | 11 December 2022 | TBA |
| – | – | "Extra" | 18 December 2022 | TBA |

=== Series 18 (2023) ===
| No. overall | No. in season | Title | Original release date | Viewers (millions) |
|---|---|---|---|---|
| 216 | 1 | "Episode 1" | 19 March 2023 | TBA |
Celebrating their 18th season in Warsaw, the team arrives in style at a luxurious villa! We will meet new faces, and debutants will not miss the baptism.
| 217 | 2 | "Episode 2" | 26 March 2023 | TBA |
At the first party, kissing and arguing warm up the atmosphere even more. Humor leaves Sarna with the arrival of the Boss and the announcement of the punishments. In a Bodypainting activity, the bodies acquire color.
| 218 | 3 | "Episode 3" | 2 April 2023 | TBA |
Sarna bravely bears the punishment, and the team will go to Radom!. The group seized Spiker's body and several hearts. Piotr circulates between Ola and Angelika, and Eliasz becomes an easy target for the girls.
| 219 | 4 | "Episode 4" | 16 April 2023 | TBA |
Sarna manages to redeem himself with Angelika. Oliwia feels sorry. Compulsive buying! Lena is the greatest "gem" of the second hand. Enchanted by the illusions, the team also succumbs to the magic of a pink limousine.
| 220 | 5 | "Episode 5" | 23 April 2023 | TBA |
The night is filled with friendship and scenes of jealousy. Sarna deepens with the new acquaintance. Lena's mysterious relationship with her ex-boyfriend: doesn't old love rust?.
| 221 | 6 | "Episode 6" | 7 May 2023 | TBA |
It's house party time! And there are familiar faces in the crowd. Performances, dances and... proposals on stage! Ewelona enchants with her voice, Alan flirts with Angelika. Although jealousy in itself says a lot, the party is conducive to confessions.
| 222 | 7 | "Episode 7" | 14 May 2023 | TBA |
The house party is coming to an end, but it's still not enough for some. Oliwia's attention turns to a handsome friend. More fights! Drinks, sausages, cucumbers and helicopters fly in front of your eyes.
| 223 | 8 | "Episode 8" | 21 May 2023 | TBA |
Warmed up by a burlesque performance, the team spends a hot afternoon in the sauna. Sarna finds himself in the role of a father, with a child crawling under his care. It was relaxing, time to get fit!
| 224 | 9 | "Episode 9" | 28 May 2023 | TBA |
Wiktoria says goodbye to the team. Jealousy is in my head! Alan's presence annoys Piotrek and Ola distances himself from Eliasz. The little boy conquers the fan's heart, but the night ends in drama: Milena and Sequento leave the house.
| 225 | 10 | "Episode 10" | 4 June 2023 | TBA |
Dzik and Kasjusz are back in action! Milena and Sequento also return. Oliwia seduces Kasjusz and makes him jealous. Ángelika, the queen of dramas: her rejection and torn pants cause scandals. Eliasz follows Ola like a shadow.
| 226 | 11 | "Episode 11" | 11 June 2023 | TBA |
| 227 | 12 | "Episode 12" | 18 June 2023 | TBA |
It's going to be a tough ride!. After the adrenaline rush behind the wheel of a monster truck, the team goes to Ostrołęka to start a fat ballet. Eliasz tries his luck among the fans and Angelika, offended by Piotrek, looks for a handsome man.
| 228 | 13 | "Episode 13" | 25 June 2023 | TBA |
The tactics don't matter, it's the podium that counts! The last party is a real mix of lots of fun, lots of kissing and loud scandals. Jealousy reaches its limit, boys against Maly. The Śląska gang won't let the team sleep!.

=== Series 19 (2023) ===
| No. overall | No. in season | Title | Original release date | Viewers (millions) |
|---|---|---|---|---|
| 229 | 1 | "Episode 1" | 17 September 2023 | TBA |
| 230 | 2 | "Episode 2" | 24 September 2023 | TBA |
| 231 | 3 | "Episode 3" | 1 October 2023 | TBA |
| 232 | 4 | "Episode 4" | 8 October 2023 | TBA |
| 233 | 5 | "Episode 5" | 15 October 2023 | TBA |
| 234 | 6 | "Episode 6" | 22 October 2023 | TBA |
| 235 | 7 | "Episode 7" | 29 October 2023 | TBA |
| 236 | 8 | "Episode 8" | 5 November 2023 | TBA |
| 237 | 9 | "Episode 9" | 12 November 2023 | TBA |
| 238 | 10 | "Episode 10" | 19 November 2023 | TBA |
| 239 | 11 | "Episode 11" | 26 November 2023 | TBA |
| 240 | 12 | "Episode 12" | 3 December 2023 | TBA |
| 241 | 13 | "Episode 13" | 10 December 2023 | TBA |

=== Series 20 (2024) ===
| No. overall | No. in season | Title | Original release date | Viewers (millions) |
|---|---|---|---|---|
| 242 | 1 | "Episode 1" | 17 March 2024 | TBA |
Ready to celebrate the anniversary edition, the team reaches the colorful villa. The partygoers include new people and Jez and his snow-white smile.
| 243 | 2 | "Episode 2" | 24 March 2024 | TBA |
The club's dance floor is full of people dancing, the girls hug Jez and Mały hugs Magda. The team gets serious seeing the guests and the extreme attraction.
| 244 | 3 | "Episode 3" | 7 April 2024 | TBA |
In Ostrołęka the band will warm up the audience!. Spiker is horny for the honey cheese and Angelika is horny for Jez, who finally falls asleep in Grzesiek's arms.
| 245 | 4 | "Episode 4" | 14 April 2024 | TBA |
Don Kasjo joins the fun with the gang! The night is full of wild parties and scenes of jealousy. Mały guy is chased by a "kitten", and Jez's snow-white smile attracts not only Diana.
| 246 | 5 | "Episode 5" | 21 April 2024 | TBA |
Fun housewives will encourage the team to spend an unforgettable night and prepare a night party at home. Pedro arrives at the event directly from the playing field, expanding the group of veterans among the numerous guests.
| 247 | 6 | "Episode 6" | 28 April 2024 | TBA |
| 248 | 7 | "Episode 7" | 5 May 2024 | TBA |
A strong hangover and the announcement of punishments are echoes of an epic house party, and now it's time to perform real stunts. The wine tasting prepares the group for the upcoming party, but Jez suffers some painful karma. Lena spends the day in the arms of her new boyfriend.
| 249 | 8 | "Episode 8" | 12 May 2024 | TBA |
| 250 | 9 | "Episode 9" | 19 May 2024 | TBA |
While Olaf is thinking about a date, Nathan shows up at the house!. Some people feel their legs shaking, others are speechless: the BDSM night show works in a similar way and prepares the team for the party.
| 251 | 10 | "Episode 10" | 26 May 2024 | TBA |
A quiet morning in the company of alpacas turns into euphoria when seeing Diva, who takes the team to a colorful world of happiness and excitement. A friendship develops between Ola and Nathan.
| 252 | 11 | "Episode 11" | 2 June 2024 | TBA |
Grzegorz takes over the sex shop and Olaf puts a stormy end to his adventure. The team receives more Legends and says goodbye to Nathan.
| 253 | 12 | "Episode 12" | 9 June 2024 | TBA |
Working with a hangover can be a nightmare, but becoming a mermaid is a dream come true! From the underwater depths we jump onto the dance floor and Kasjo joins the party. Kasia's presence contributes to divisions and arguments.
| 254 | 13 | "Episode 13" | 16 June 2024 | TBA |

=== Series 21 (2024) ===
| No. overall | No. in season | Title | Original release date | Viewers (millions) |
|---|---|---|---|---|
| 255 | 1 | "Episode 1" | 22 September 2024 | TBA |
Szczecin welcomes the team of Warsaw Shore. It's time for crazy beach parties!. Emotions rise every time the doors of the fabulous villa open.
| 256 | 2 | "Episode 2" | 29 September 2024 | TBA |
The team started the season brilliantly: with a big party!
| 257 | 3 | "Episode 3" | 6 October 2024 | TBA |
The team recharge their batteries by the sea before the party, where the boys bravely put their plan into practice.
| 258 | 4 | "Episode 4" | 13 October 2024 | TBA |
In Berlin, a daring and high-profile trip awaits the team. Belly and Fabio join the adventure.
| 259 | 5 | "Episode 5" | 20 October 2024 | TBA |
Adam's courtship turns into a drama and Juliet's into a fruitful romance.
| 260 | 6 | "Episode 6" | 27 October 2024 | TBA |
This house party is a real fire! Luckily, Ola has her own firefighter and Belly has her own Bobson - you never know when you'll have to run to get water, which is literally boiling in the hot tub. Adam will definitely not forget this night, the rest will remember it thanks to their tattoos. Total freestyle!
| 261 | 7 | "Episode 7" | 3 November 2024 | TBA |
The team is resting after the house party, but Ewelona is not sleeping: it's time to clean up and fly through the sky! Grzegorz is close to love, and Michał and Angelika are in conflict again. Belly and Fabio's farewell is a mixture of sadness and joy, but unfortunately Bobson ruined it. It's going to be a difficult journey!
| 262 | 8 | "Episode 8" | 17 November 2024 | TBA |
It's not just the salt water that's cheering the team up: Adam's return is another cause for celebration, and the breaking of the female code is another cause for scandal. Painting male nudes and knocking them down helps to ease some emotions, but in Mielno another surprise awaits us.
| 263 | 9 | "Episode 9" | 24 November 2024 | TBA |
After a crazy fun in Mielno, it was time to say goodbye to Belly and Fabio.
| 264 | 10 | "Episode 10" | 1 December 2024 | TBA |
The Boss is putting things in order, but some details come to light that cause chaos. While the boys are staying together in the chill-out area at home, drama breaks out in the pub. After an intense night, yoga relaxes the atmosphere a bit and a special date awaits Oliwia.
| 265 | 11 | "Episode 11" | 8 December 2024 | TBA |
The Boss announces a big attraction and the survey is just an introduction to other emotions. Julita searches for Adam, Angelika tests Bobson and drama awaits the new relationship. A fashion show in Berlin full of music, dance and colors ends in heartbreak for Ola.
| 266 | 12 | "Episode 12" | 15 December 2024 | TBA |
Excitement, drama and goodbyes in Mielno! The penultimate event of the season, the last for Spiker. Angelika and Bobson have adventures, but love between Jez and Oliwia blossoms. The boys will enjoy a walk through the mud, while the girls will enjoy a prank and bad vibes.
| 267 | 13 | "Episode 13" | 22 December 2024 | TBA |
The final event was a real journey without limits. Sparks fly between Ola and Michał and Angela's jealousy takes its toll. Fortunately, Bobson keeps his fiery temper in check. Christmas morning and the last cruise put an end to an unforgettable and "divine" holiday!

== Specials ==
| Featured season | Title | Duration | Polish viewers | Original Airdate |
|---|---|---|---|---|
| Season 1 | "Best Bits" | 60 minutes | TBA | 26 January 2014 |
A look back at the most memorable moments from the first series.
| Season 1 | "Reunion" | 60 minutes | TBA | 2 February 2014 |
Katarzyna Kępka hosts as the cast reunite to discuss the events of the first series.
| Season 3 | "The Trybsons, Part I" | 60 minutes | TBA | 27 September 2015 |
Eliza and Trybson discuss getting to know each other and falling in love during series 1. They get even closer after they go home. Eliza's pregnancy is a complete surprise. Trybson moves to Tuliszów so they can start a life together. Eliza gives birth to a baby girl.
| Season 3 | "The Trybsons, Part II" | 60 minutes | TBA | 4 October 2015 |
The new parents adjust to life with Victoria. Trybson plans his proposal to Eliza. He surprises her during a romantic evening. The lovebirds travel to a fancy hotel. Trybson trains hard for an upcoming wrestling match while Eliza releases her first single.
| Season 14 | "Extra" | 45 minutes | TBA | 7 February 2021 (Player.pl) |
The team reminisces about the season and shares some unaired moments.
| Season 15 | "Extra" | 43 minutes | TBA | 27 June 2021 (Player.pl) |
| Season 16 | "Extra" | 43 minutes | TBA | 12 December 2021 (Player.pl) |
This season was very intense for the team, so Kamil and Jez decided to additionally share with the viewers a few "cherries on the cake" that should not be missed!.
| Season 17 | "Extra" | 43 minutes | TBA | 18 December 2022 (Player.pl) |
