= Czekanka =

- Village
- Location within Poland
- Coordinates: 50°29′N 19°15′E
- Country: Poland
- Voivodeship: Silesian
- County: Będzin
- Gmina: Siewierz
- Population: 128
- Website: http://www.czekanka.pl

Czekanka [t͡ʂɛˈkaŋka] is a village in the administrative district of Gmina Siewierz, within Będzin County, Silesian Voivodeship, in southern Poland.
