= Przedwarężyn =

- Village
- Location within Poland
- Coordinates: 50°23′N 19°10′E
- Country: Poland
- Voivodeship: Silesian
- County: Będzin
- Gmina: Siewierz

Przedwarężyn [pʂɛdvaˈrɛ̃ʐɨn] is a village in the administrative district of Gmina Siewierz, within Będzin County, Silesian Voivodeship, in southern Poland.
