= Dziewki =

- Village
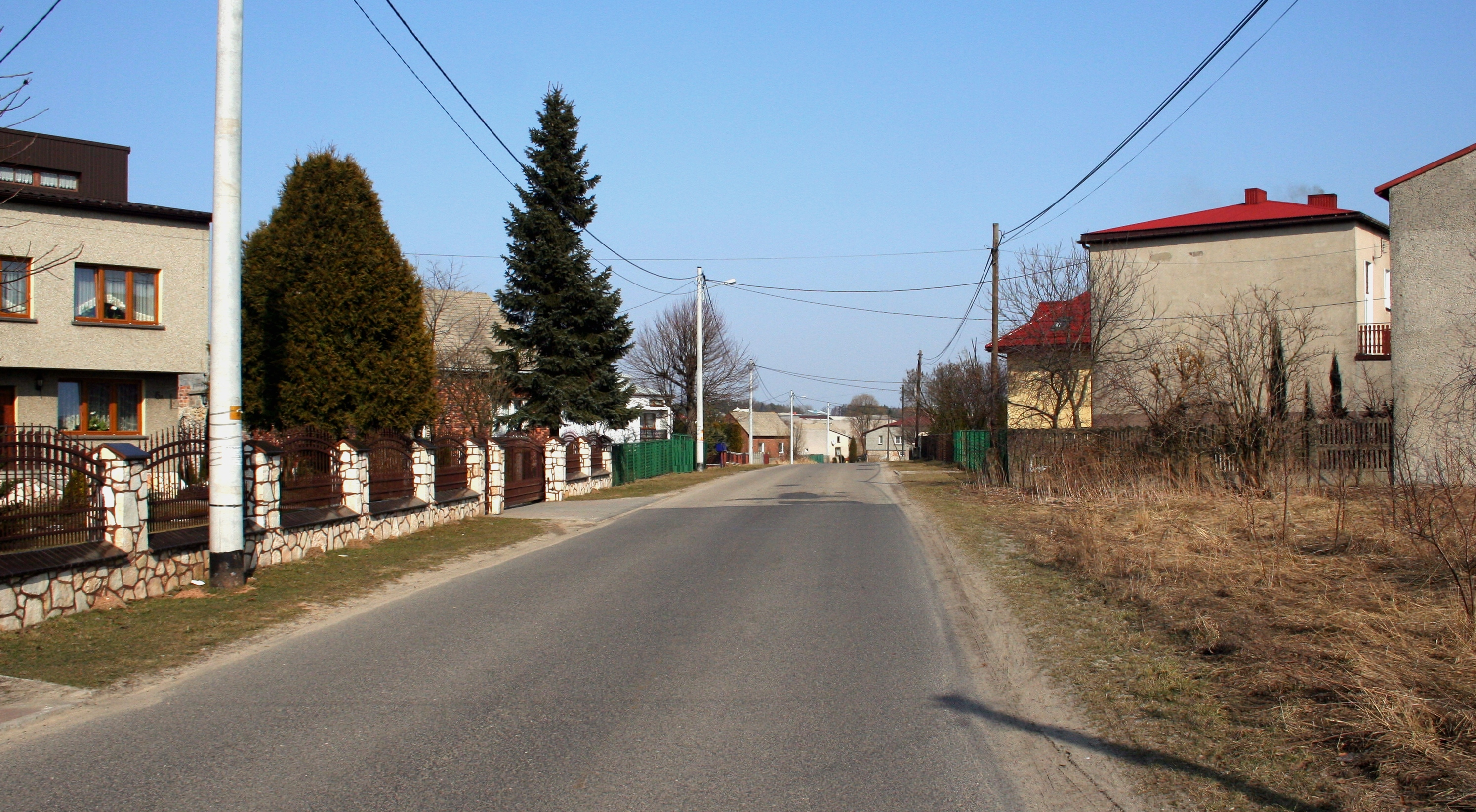

- Location within Poland
- Coordinates: 50°30′N 19°13′E
- Country: Poland
- Voivodeship: Silesian
- County: Będzin
- Gmina: Siewierz
- Population: 313

Dziewki [ˈd͡ʑɛfkʲi] is a village in the administrative district of Gmina Siewierz, within Będzin County, Silesian Voivodeship, in southern Poland.
