= Dzierżawa, Silesian Voivodeship =

Dzierżawa
- Village
- Location within Poland
- Coordinates: 50°31′N 19°15′E
- Country: Poland
- Voivodeship: Silesian
- County: Będzin
- Gmina: Siewierz
- Population: 7

Dzierżawa [d͡ʑɛrˈʐava] is a village in the administrative district of Gmina Siewierz, within Będzin County, Silesian Voivodeship, in southern Poland.
