= Vojkovice =

Vojkovice may refer to places in the Czech Republic:

- Vojkovice (Brno-Country District), a municipality and village in the South Moravian Region
- Vojkovice (Frýdek-Místek District), a municipality and village in the Moravian-Silesian Region
- Vojkovice (Karlovy Vary District), a municipality and village in the Karlovy Vary Region
- Vojkovice (Mělník District), a municipality and village in the Central Bohemian Region

== See also ==
- Wojkowice (disambiguation)
