= Leśniaki =

Leśniaki may refer to the following places:

- Leśniaki, Gmina Rusiec in Łódź Voivodeship (central Poland)
- Leśniaki, Gmina Szczerców in Łódź Voivodeship (central Poland)
- Leśniaki, Masovian Voivodeship (east-central Poland)
- Leśniaki, Będzin County in Silesian Voivodeship (south Poland)
- Leśniaki, Częstochowa County in Silesian Voivodeship (south Poland)
