= Marcinków, Silesian Voivodeship =

Marcinków
- Village
- Location within Poland
- Coordinates: 50°25′30″N 19°12′32″E
- Country: Poland
- Voivodeship: Silesian
- County: Będzin
- Gmina: Siewierz
- Population: 134

Marcinków [marˈt͡ɕiŋkuf] is a village in the administrative district of Gmina Siewierz, within Będzin County, Silesian Voivodeship, in southern Poland.
