= Gołuchowice =

Gołuchowice may refer to the following places:

- Gołuchowice, Lesser Poland Voivodeship (south Poland)
- Gołuchowice, Będzin County in Silesian Voivodeship (south Poland)
- Gołuchowice, Zawiercie County in Silesian Voivodeship (south Poland)
