= Brudzowice =

- Village
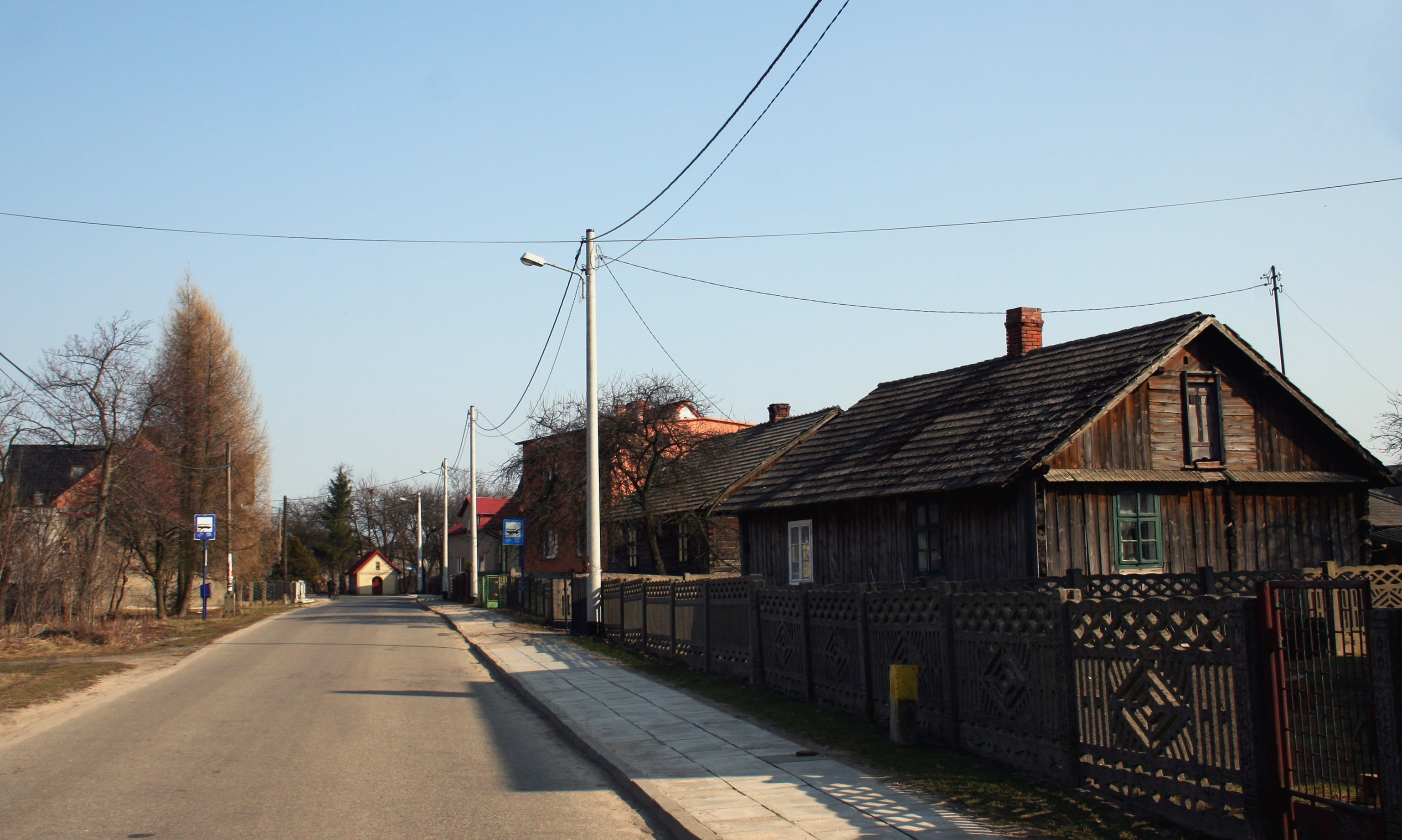
- Road through the village

- Location within Poland
- Coordinates: 50°30′N 19°11′E
- Country: Poland
- Voivodeship: Silesian
- County: Będzin
- Gmina: Siewierz
- Population: 1,221

Brudzowice [brud͡zɔˈvʲit͡sɛ] is a village in the administrative district of Gmina Siewierz, within Będzin County, Silesian Voivodeship, in southern Poland.
