= Nowa Wioska =

Nowa Wioska may refer to the following places in Poland:

- Nowa Wioska, Lower Silesian Voivodeship (south-west Poland)
- Nowa Wioska, Kuyavian-Pomeranian Voivodeship (north-central Poland)
- Nowa Wioska, Greater Poland Voivodeship (central Poland)
- Nowa Wioska, Będzin County in Silesian Voivodeship (south Poland)
- Nowa Wioska, Racibórz County in Silesian Voivodeship (south Poland)
- Nowa Wioska, Gmina Gubin, Krosno County in Lubusz Voivodeship (west Poland)
- Nowa Wioska, Świebodzin County in Lubusz Voivodeship (west Poland)
- Nowa Wioska, Pomeranian Voivodeship (north Poland)
