= Wojkowice Kościelne =

- Village
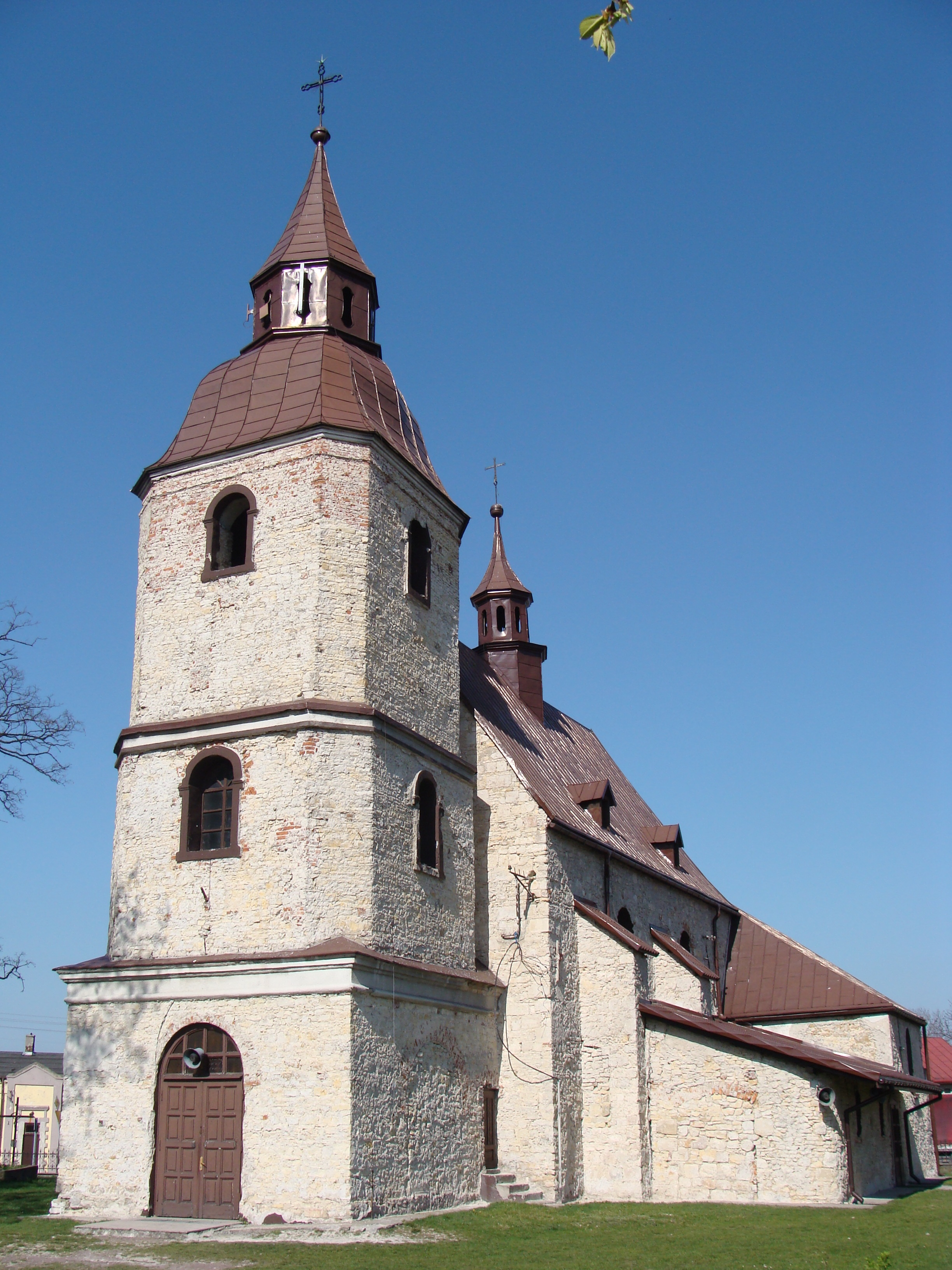
- Saint Martin Church

- Location within Poland
- Coordinates: 50°24′N 19°12′E
- Country: Poland
- Voivodeship: Silesian
- County: Będzin
- Gmina: Siewierz

Population
  - Total: 1,251
- Postal code: 42-510

Wojkowice Kościelne [vɔi̯kɔˈvʲit͡sɛ kɔɕˈt͡ɕɛlnɛ] is a village in the administrative district of Gmina Siewierz, within Będzin County, Silesian Voivodeship, in southern Poland.
