= Tuliszów =

- Village
- Location within Poland
- Coordinates: 50°26′N 19°12′E
- Country: Poland
- Voivodeship: Silesian
- County: Będzin
- Gmina: Siewierz
- Population: 119

Tuliszów [tuˈlʲiʂuf] is a village in the administrative district of Gmina Siewierz, within Będzin County, Silesian Voivodeship, in southern Poland.
