= Gmina Siewierz =

Gmina Siewierz Siewierz Commune
- Gmina
- Coat of arms
- Interactive map of Gmina Siewierz
- Coordinates (Siewierz): 50°28′24″N 19°13′59″E
- Country: Poland
- Voivodeship: Silesian
- County: Będzin
- Seat: Siewierz

Area
  - Total: 115.76 km^{2} (44.70 sq mi)

Population (2019-06-30)
  - Total: 12,460
  - Density: 107.6/km^{2} (278.8/sq mi)
  - Urban: 5,581
  - Rural: 6,879
- Website: http://www.siewierz.pl

Gmina Siewierz is an urban-rural gmina (administrative district) in Będzin County, Silesian Voivodeship, in southern Poland. Its seat is the town of Siewierz, which lies approximately 18 kilometres (11 mi) north-east of Będzin and 30 km (19 mi) north-east of the regional capital Katowice.

The gmina covers an area of 115.76 square kilometres (44.7 sq mi), and as of 2019 its total population is 12,460.

== Villages ==
Apart from the town of Siewierz, Gmina Siewierz contains the villages and settlements of Brudzowice, Czekanka, Dzierżawa, Dziewki, Gołuchowice, Hektary, Kuźnica Piaskowa, Kuźnica Podleśna, Kuźnica Warężyńska, Leśniaki, Marcinków, Nowa Wioska, Podwarężyn, Podwarpie, Przedwarężyn, Słowik, Tuliszów, Warężyn, Wojkowice Kościelne, Zawarpie and Żelisławice.

== Neighbouring gminas ==
Gmina Siewierz is bordered by the towns of Dąbrowa Górnicza, Myszków and Poręba, and by the gminas of Koziegłowy, Łazy, Mierzęcice and Ożarowice.

== Twin towns – sister cities ==
Gmina Siewierz is twinned with:

- Edelény, Hungary
