= Wojkowice =

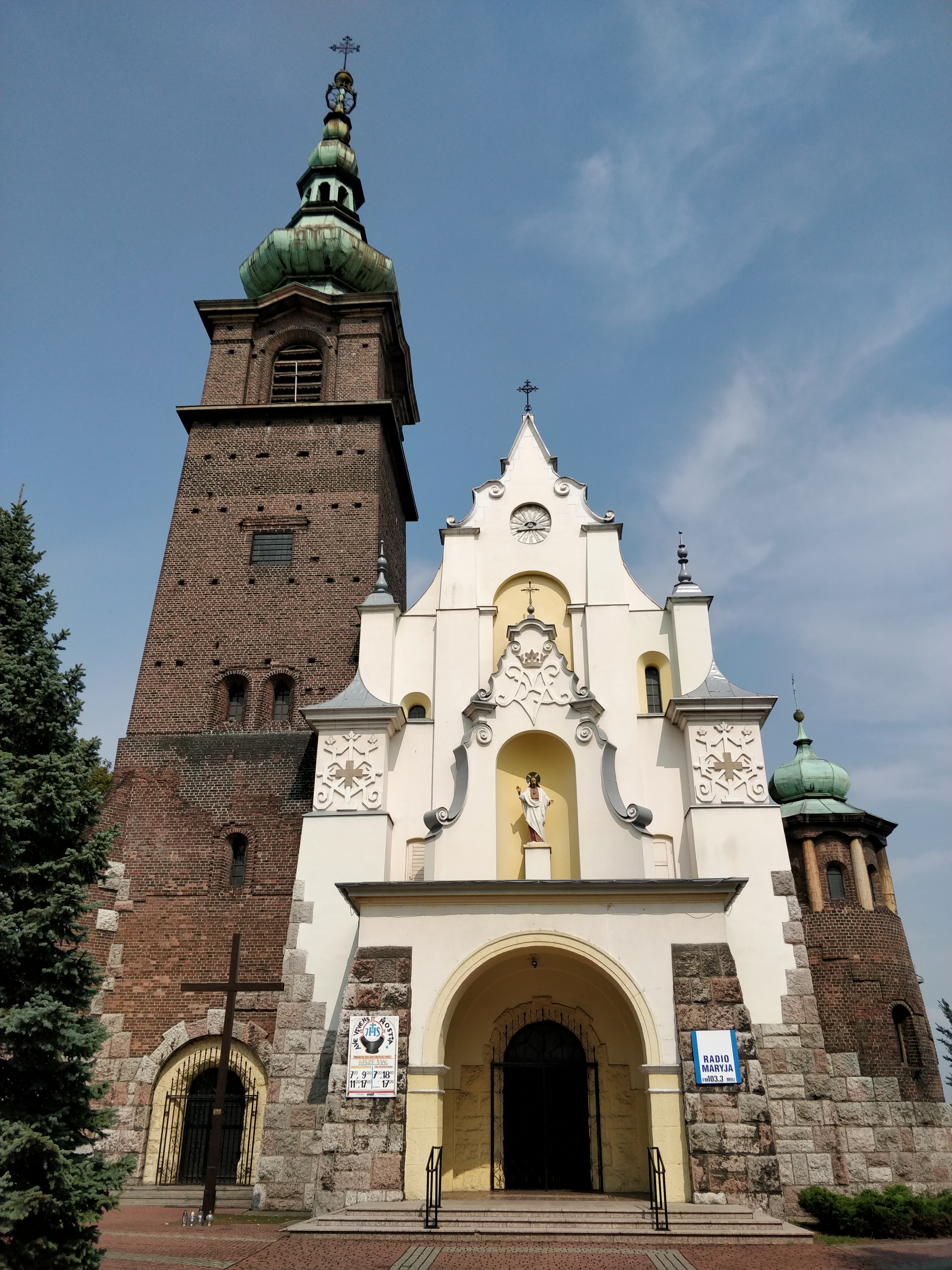
- Church of Saint Anthony of Padua in Wojkowice

- Flag Coat of arms

- Location within Poland
- Coordinates: 50°22′N 19°3′E
- Country: Poland
- Voivodeship: Silesian
- County: Będzin
- Gmina: Wojkowice (urban gmina)
- First mentioned: 1271

Area
  - City: 12.79 km^{2} (4.94 sq mi)

Population (2019-06-30)
  - City: 8,927
  - Density: 698.0/km^{2} (1,808/sq mi)
  - Urban: 2,746,000
  - Metro: 5,294,000
- Time zone: UTC+1 (CET)
  - Summer (DST): UTC+2 (CEST)
- Postal code: 42-580
- Vehicle registration: SBE
- Primary airport: Katowice Airport
- Website: http://www.wojkowice.pl

Wojkowice [vɔi̯kɔˈvʲit͡sɛ] is a town in the Silesian Voivodeship in southern Poland, located in the Dąbrowa Basin, near Katowice. Wojkowice is located in the Silesian Highlands, on the Brynica river (tributary of the Vistula), and historically belongs to Lesser Poland. Its name comes from ancient Polish given name Wojek, which might have been a diminutive of Wojslaw. Several other locations in Poland have been named in a similar fashion – Wojslawice, Wojkowo, Wojkow, Wojkowa.

The town used to be in Katowice Voivodeship, but has been part of the Silesian Voivodeship since the formation of the voivodeship in 1999. Wojkowice is one of the cities of the 2.7 million conurbation – Katowice urban area and within a greater Katowice-Ostrava metropolitan area populated by about 5,294,000 people. The population of the town is 8,927 (2019).

== Location and districts ==
Wojkowice borders the gmina of Bobrowniki, and the towns of Będzin (the district of Grodziec), Siemianowice Śląskie (the district of Przełajka), and Piekary Śląskie (the districts of Dąbrowka Wielka and Brzozowice-Kamień). In 2002, the area of the town was 12.77 km^{2} (4.93 sq mi), out of which arable land was 61%. Wojkowice in its current form was created on 31 December 1961, out of the merger of two settlements (called "colonies"): Wojkowice Komorne and Żychcice. On 18 July 1962, Wojkowice was granted town rights.

== History ==
The settlement of Wojkowice Komorne was first mentioned in 1271, while the existence of Żychcice (Zyhcych) was first documented in 1277. In that year, a Roman Catholic parish was opened in nearby Kamień, together with church of St. Peter and Paul. The area of Wojkowice was probably destroyed in the devastating Mongol invasion of Poland (1240s). Jan Długosz in his works mentions Wojkowice, but does not write about Żychcice. In the late Middle Ages, the area belonged to the Silesian Dukes of Bytom and Cieszyn, who after Mongol raids initiated a program of settlement, founding several new villages.

In the 15th century the area of Wojkowice became property of Bishops of Kraków, as part of Duchy of Siewierz. In the 1470s Jan Długosz wrote in his Liber beneficiorum that Wojkowice Komorne was a village in the parish of Siewierz. The Duchy of Siewierz existed until 1790, when it was merged with the Kraków Voivodeship of the Lesser Poland Province. In the late 1780s, the population of Wojkowice Komorne was 214, with 32 houses. Iron ore was already mined in the area. Both villages (Wojkowice Komorne and Żychcice) remained part of Polish–Lithuanian Commonwealth until 1795. After the Third Partition of Poland, the territory of former Duchy of Siewierz was seized by the Kingdom of Prussia, as part of the newly established province of New Silesia (October 1795).

Prussian authorities invested heavily in industrialization of the region. In 1797 they opened a small coal mine, and employed a number of residents of the province in the enterprises located in the Province of Silesia. During the Napoleonic Wars, New Silesia was annexed into the Duchy of Warsaw, ending 12 years of Prussian rule. In 1807, Wojkowice became part of Kalisz Department, Lelów- Siewierz County. In 1815, the Duchy of Warsaw was turned into Russian-controlled Congress Poland, remaining under Russian control until World War I. In 1867, Wojkowice was part of Będzin County, Piotrków Governorate, where it remained until 1918. In the late 19th century there was a coal, calamine and lead mine in Wojkowice Komorne. Wojkowice Komorne had a population of 737 in the late 19th century.

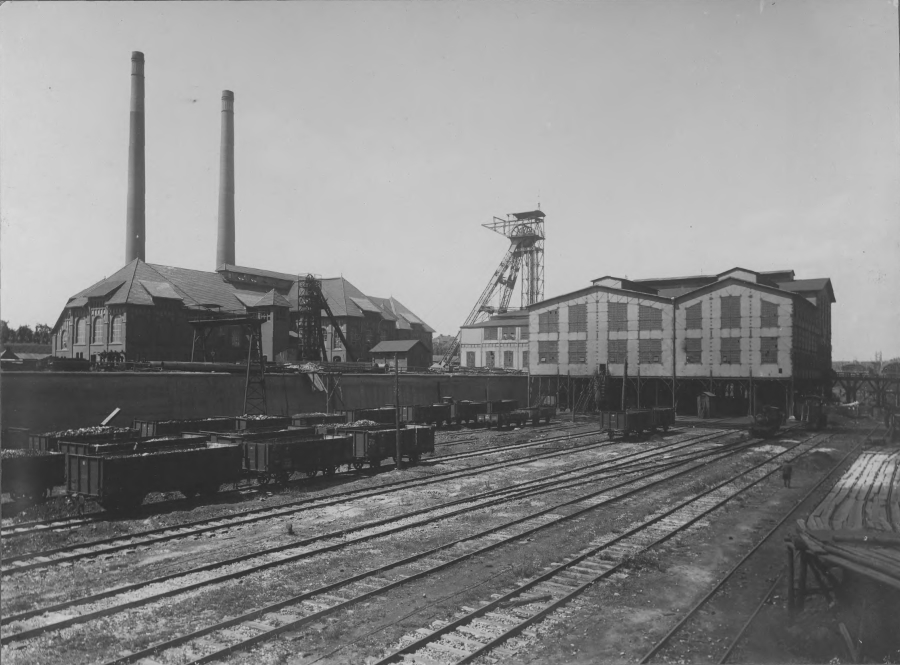
Jowisz coal mine in the interbellum

In 1914, Zagłębie Dąbrowskie was captured by the Central Powers, and remained under joint German–Austrian occupation until November 1918, when Poland regained independence. In the Second Polish Republic Wojkowice, with population of 4,000, was part of Będziny County, Kielce Voivodeship.

After the invasion of Poland, which started World War II in September 1939, the Będzin County was directly annexed into Nazi Germany, and then made part of Gau Upper Silesia. Two local Polish policemen were murdered by the Russians in the Katyn massacre in 1940. The German administration operated the E755 forced labour subcamp of the Stalag VIII-B/344 prisoner-of-war camp in the settlement. In early 1945, the German occupation ended and Wojkowice was restored to Poland, although with a Soviet-installed communist regime, which then stayed in power until the Fall of Communism in the 1980s.

In early 1945, Wojkowice returned to Kielce Voivodeship, but in August 1945 it was transferred to Katowice Voivodeship (until 1950, called Silesia – Dabrowa Voivodeship). Until 1954, Wojkowice was part of the gmina of Bobrowniki. In 1926, local residents tried to create a separate gmina of Wojkowice, but their efforts were rejected by the government.

On December 31, 1961, Żychcice-Kamice was merged with Wojkowice Komorne. The new settlement was named Wojkowice and received town charter on July 18, 1962. In February 1977 Wojkowice became a district of Będzin, and remained so until January 1, 1992.

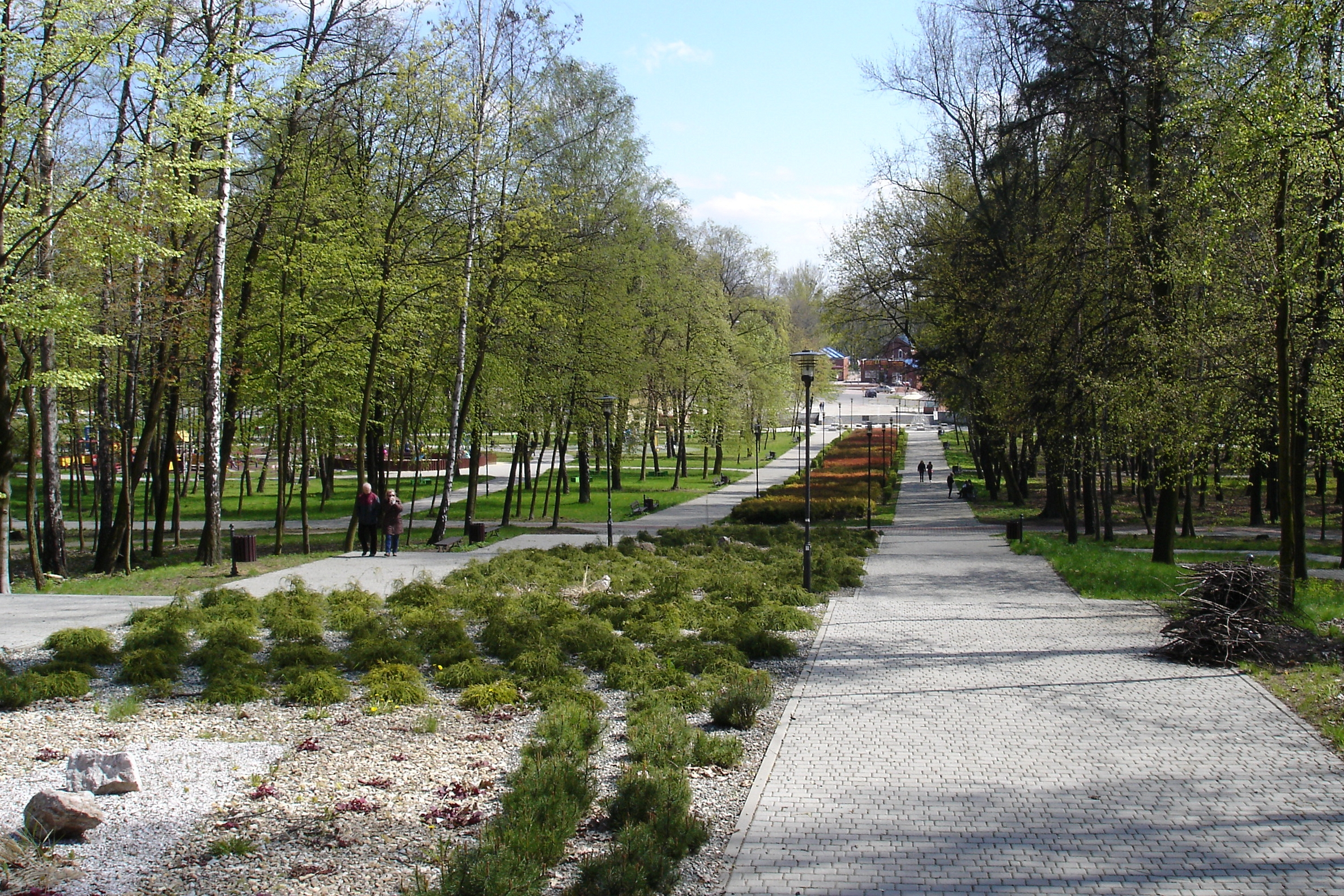
Park Miejski ("Municipal Park")

== Transport and industry ==
Wojkowice lies 5 km (3 mi) from National Road Nr. 94, which goes from Zgorzelec to Kraków, and which is an alternative route of the Motorway A4. Furthermore, some 7 km (4 mi) away goes National Road Nr. 86 (European route E75). Wojkowice used to have a rail station on the route from Tarnowskie Góry to Dąbrowa Górnicza Zabkowice. In 1957–2006, there was a tram connection to Będzin. In 2001, Saturn Cement Plant was closed, and in 2006, Jowisz Coal Mine ceased operation. Wojkowice is home to a large prison (Zaklad Karny Wojkowice), which uses the complex of a POW camp, built by the Germans in the 1940s. The prison itself was opened here in 1959.

== Sports ==
Wojkowice is home to a sports club Górnik Wojkowice, whose football team played in Polish Second Division in 1968–69 and 1973–75.

== Twin towns – sister cities ==
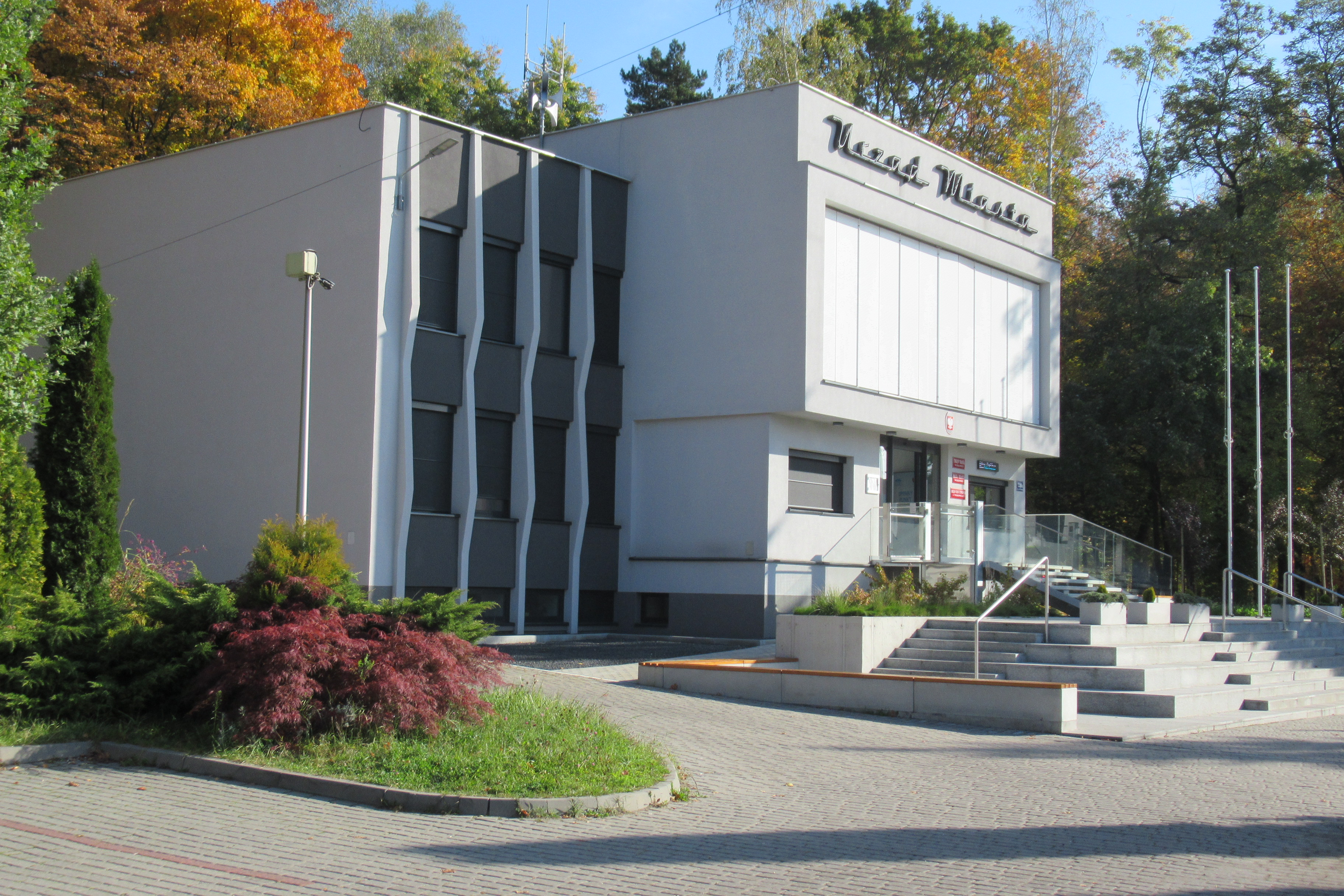
Town hall

Wojkowice is twinned with:

- Łapsze Niżne, Poland
- Sjenica, Serbia
