= Vojkovice (Brno-Country District) =

- Municipality
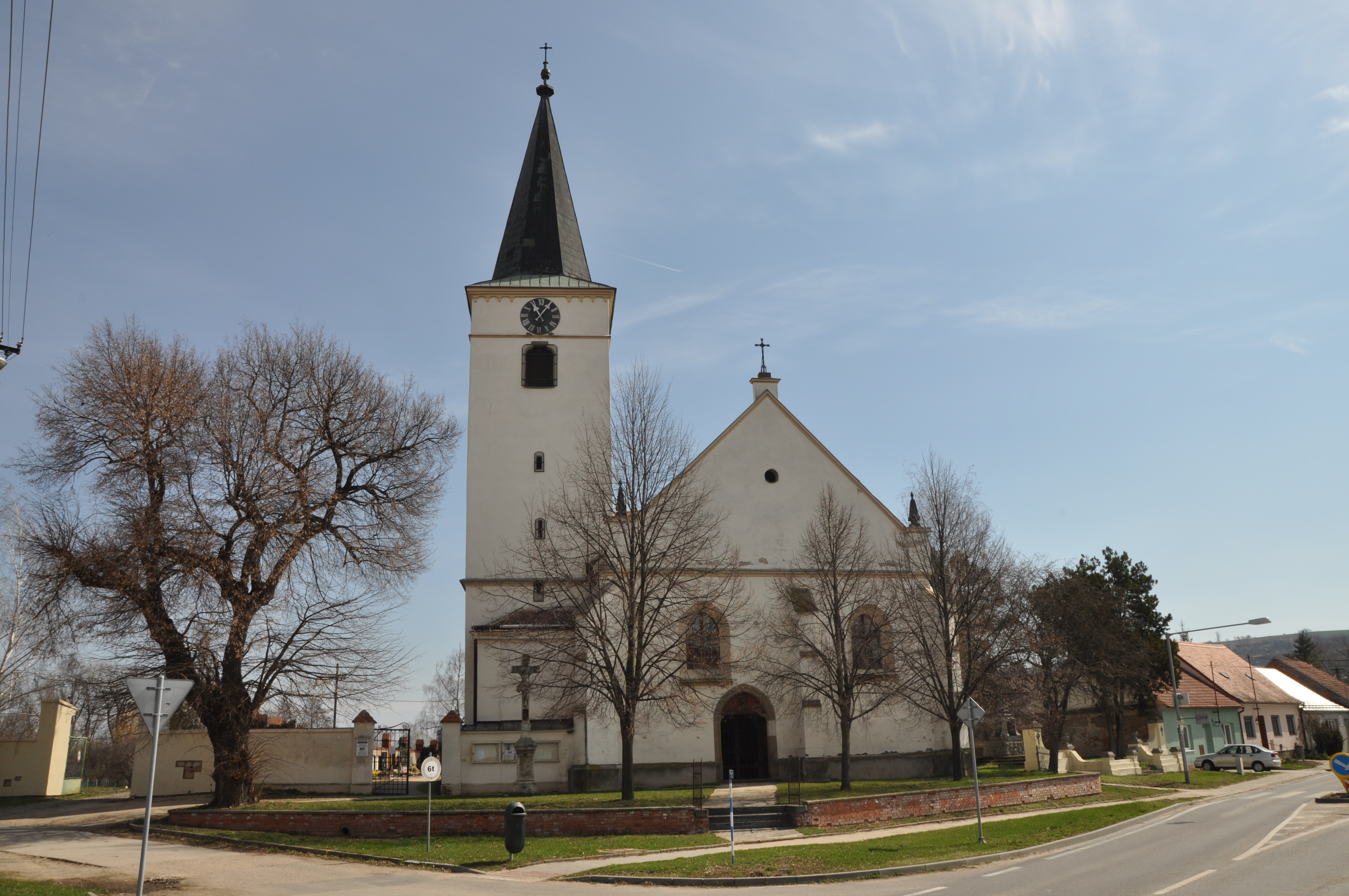
- Church of Saint Lawrence

- Flag Coat of arms

- Location in the Czech Republic
- Coordinates: 49°3′5″N 16°36′30″E
- Country: Czech Republic
- Region: South Moravian
- District: Brno-Country
- First mentioned: 1141

Area
  - Total: 6.98 km^{2} (2.69 sq mi)
- Elevation: 182 m (597 ft)

Population (2026-01-01)
  - Total: 1,186
  - Density: 170/km^{2} (440/sq mi)
- Time zone: UTC+1 (CET)
  - Summer (DST): UTC+2 (CEST)
- Postal code: 667 01
- Website: www.vojkovice.info

Vojkovice is a municipality and village in Brno-Country District in the South Moravian Region of the Czech Republic. It has about 1,200 inhabitants.

== Geography ==
Vojkovice is located about 15 kilometres (9 mi) south of Brno. It lies in the Dyje–Svratka Valley. The village is situated on the right bank of the Svratka River.

== History ==
The first written mention of Vojkovice is in a deed of Bishop Jindřich Zdík from 1141.

== Demographics ==
Historical population

| Year | Pop. | ±% |
|---|---|---|
| 1869 | 598 | — |
| 1880 | 645 | +7.9% |
| 1890 | 674 | +4.5% |
| 1900 | 643 | −4.6% |
| 1910 | 683 | +6.2% |

| Year | Pop. | ±% |
|---|---|---|
| 1921 | 777 | +13.8% |
| 1930 | 822 | +5.8% |
| 1950 | 804 | −2.2% |
| 1961 | 861 | +7.1% |
| 1970 | 839 | −2.6% |

| Year | Pop. | ±% |
|---|---|---|
| 1980 | 888 | +5.8% |
| 1991 | 965 | +8.7% |
| 2001 | 990 | +2.6% |
| 2011 | 1,082 | +9.3% |
| 2021 | 1,207 | +11.6% |

Source: Censuses

== Transport ==
Vojkovice is located on the railway line Tišnov–Židlochovice via Brno.

== Sights ==
The main landmark of Vojkovice is the Church of Saint Lawrence. Originally a Gothic church, it was rebuilt several times. Its current form dates from 1828. The church complex also includes a cemetery and a neo-Gothic chapel, built in 1793–1815.
