= Będzin County =

Będzin County Powiat będziński
- County
- Flag Coat of arms

- Location within the voivodeship

- Division into gminas
- Coordinates (Będzin): 50°20′N 19°7′E
- Country: Poland
- Voivodeship: Silesian
- Seat: Będzin
- Gminas: Total 8 (incl. 4 urban): Będzin; Czeladź; Sławków; Wojkowice; Gmina Bobrowniki; Gmina Mierzęcice; Gmina Psary; Gmina Siewierz

Area
  - Total: 368.02 km^{2} (142.09 sq mi)

Population (2019-06-30)
  - Total: 148,516
  - Density: 403.55/km^{2} (1,045.2/sq mi)
  - Urban: 109,694
  - Rural: 38,822
- Car plates: SBE
- Website: www.starostwo.bedzin.pl

Będzin County (Polish: powiat będziński) is a unit of territorial administration and local government (powiat) in Silesian Voivodeship, southern Poland. It came into being on 1 January 1999 as a result of the Polish local government reforms passed in 1998. Its administrative seat and largest town is Będzin, which lies 13 kilometres (8 mi) north-east of the regional capital Katowice. The county contains four other towns: Czeladź, 3 km (2 mi) west of Będzin, Wojkowice, 7 km (4 mi) north-west of Będzin, Sławków, 20 km (12 mi) east of Będzin, and Siewierz, 18 km (11 mi) north-east of Będzin.

The town of Sławków, which became part of Będzin County in 2002 when it was transferred from Lesser Poland Voivodeship to Silesian Voivodeship, forms an exclave. It is separated from the rest of the county by the cities of Dąbrowa Górnicza and Sosnowiec.

The county covers an area of 368.02 square kilometres (142.1 sq mi). As of 2019 its total population is 148,516. The most populated towns are Będzin with 56,624 inhabitants, Czeladź with 31,545 inhabitants and Wojkowice with 8,927 inhabitants.

== Neighbouring counties ==
Będzin County is bordered by Myszków County to the north, Zawiercie County to the north-east, the city of Dąbrowa Górnicza and (through Sławków) Olkusz County to the east, the city of Sosnowiec to the south, the cities of Siemianowice Śląskie and Piekary Śląskie to the west, and Tarnowskie Góry County to the north-west.

== Administrative divisions ==
The county is subdivided into eight gminas (four urban, one urban-rural and three rural). These are listed in the following table, in descending order of population.

Gmina	Type	Area (km^{2})	Population (2019)	Seat
Będzin	urban	37.1	56,624	
Czeladź	urban	16.6	31,545	
Gmina Siewierz	urban-rural	115.8	12,460	Siewierz
Gmina Psary	rural	46.0	12,190	Psary
Gmina Bobrowniki	rural	52.0	12,077	Bobrowniki
Wojkowice	urban	12.8	8,927	
Gmina Mierzęcice	rural	51.3	7,676	Mierzęcice
Sławków	urban	36.6	7,017	
