= Ogrodzieniec Castle =

Ruins of a medieval castle in Poland

Coordinates: 50°27′12″N 19°33′12″E

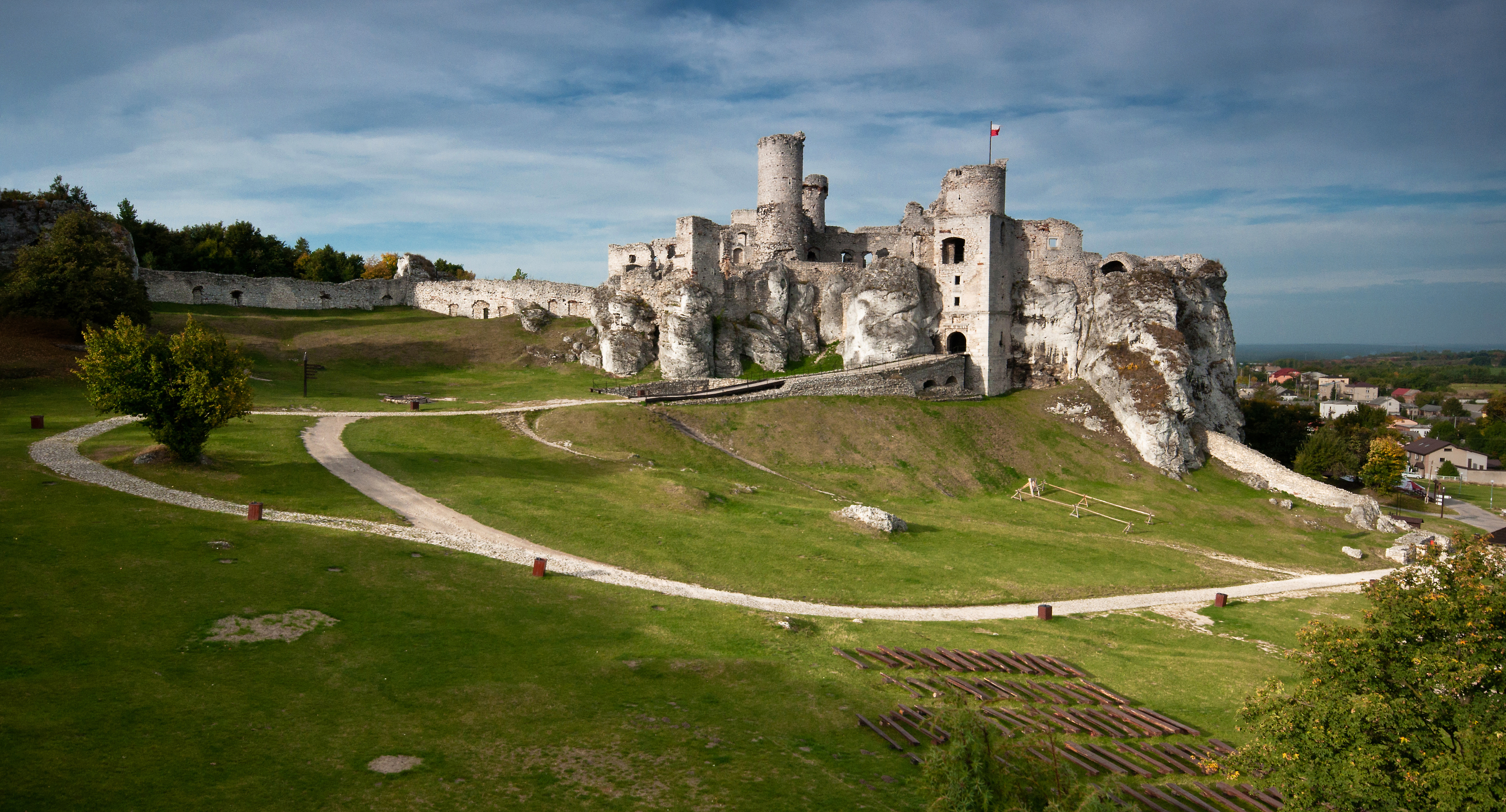
Ogrodzieniec Castle

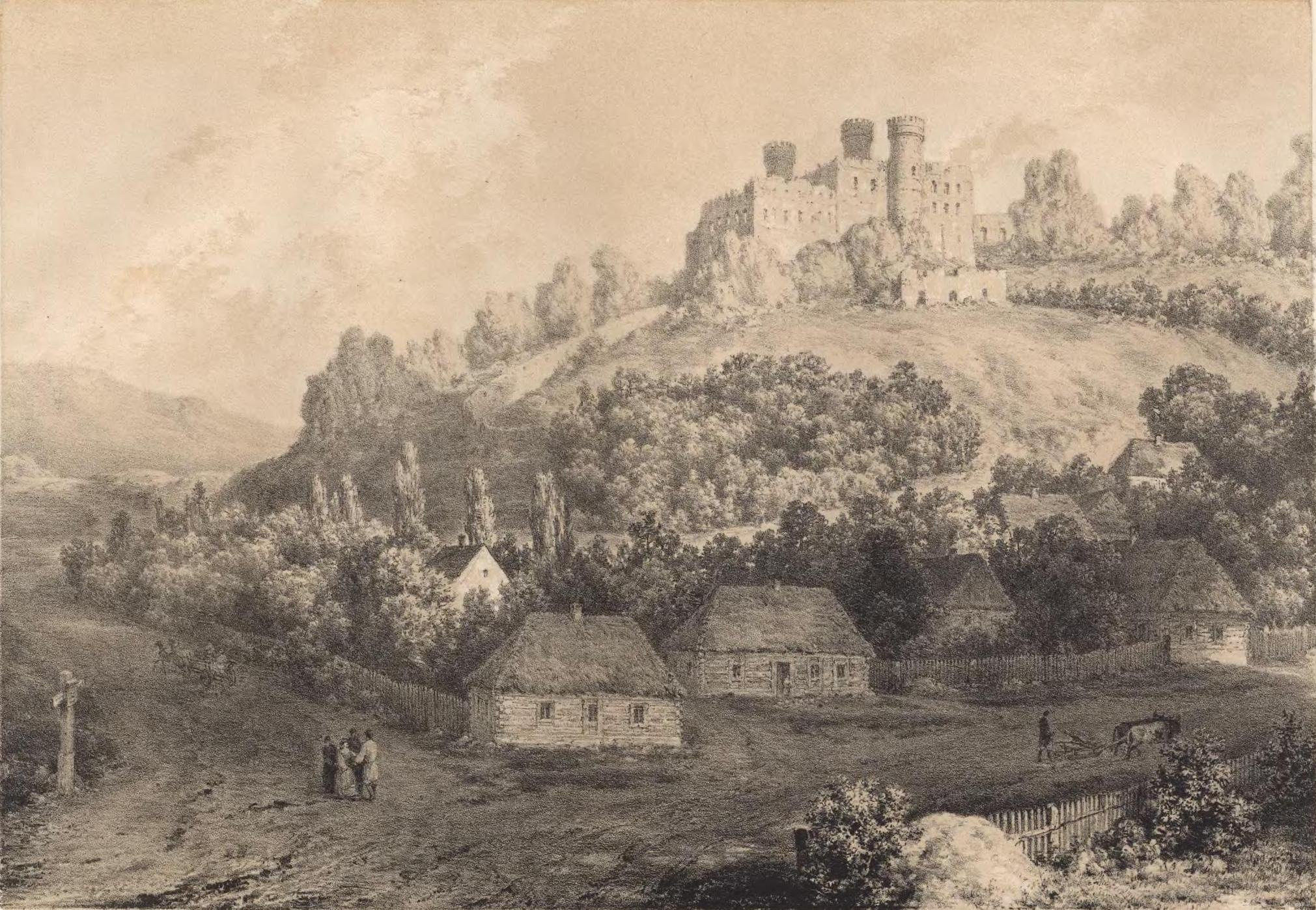
Ogrodzieniec Castle in the 19th century, by Napoleon Orda

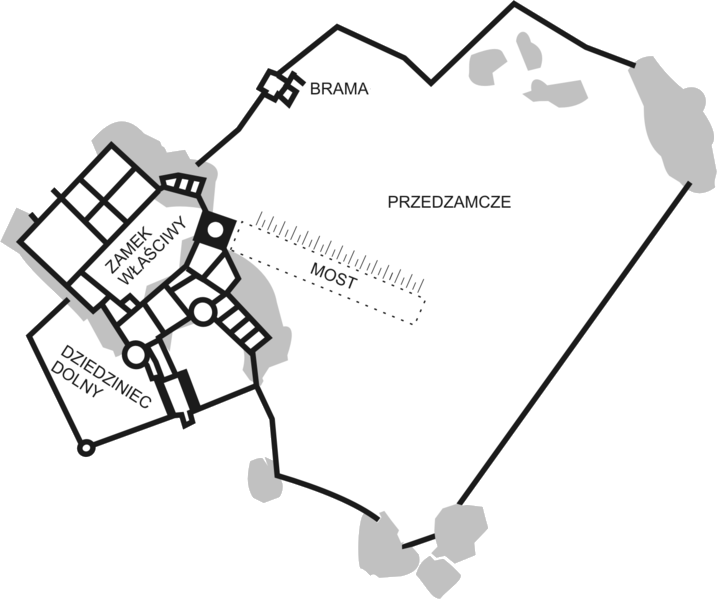
Draft of the Ogrodzieniec Castle

Ogrodzieniec Castle is a ruined medieval castle in Podzamcze, near Ogrodzieniec, the south-central region of Poland called Polish Jura. Originating in the 14th century the castle was rebuilt several times in its long history. It is situated on the top of 515.5-metre-high Castle Mountain (Polish: Góra Zamkowa), the highest hill of the Kraków-Częstochowa Upland. The ruins are open to visitors and are a part of Trail of the Eagles' Nests, a hiking trail that connects a number of well known castles in the region.

== History ==
The history of fortifications on the top of Ogrodzieniec Castle Mountain goes back to the early 12th century and the reign of Boleslaus III Wrymouth. It was during his rule when the first stronghold was built on the top of the hill. This first keep, made largely of earth and wooden ramparts, was razed to the ground in 1241 during the Mongol Invasion of Europe. In the middle of the 14th century a new gothic castle was built here to accommodate the Włodek Sulima family. Surrounded by three high rocks, the castle was well integrated into the area. The defensive walls were built to close the circuit formed by the rocks, and a narrow opening between two of the rocks served as an entrance.

In 1470, the castle and lands were bought by the wealthy Cracovian townsmen, Ibram and Piotr Salomon. Then, Ogrodzieniec became the property of Jan Feliks Rzeszowski, the rector of Przemyśl and the canon of Kraków. Around 1488, the castle was owned by Jan and subsequently Andrzej Rzeszowski and, later, the Pilecki and Chełmiński families. In 1523 the castle was bought by Jan Boner. After his death, the castle passed to his nephew, Seweryn Boner, who replaced the medieval stronghold with a renaissance castle in 1530–1545.

In 1562, the castle became the property of the Great Marshal of the Crown Jan Firlej, as a result of his marriage to Zofia, the daughter of Seweryn Boner. In 1587, the castle was captured by the Austrian archduke Maximilian III, the rejected candidate to the Polish-Lithuanian throne. In 1655, it was partly burnt by the Swedish troops, who – deployed there for almost two years – damaged the buildings considerably. From 1669 on, the castle belonged to Stanisław Warszycki, the Kraków's castellan, who managed to partly rebuild the castle after the Swedish devastations.

About 1695, the castle changed hands once again, becoming the property of the Męciński family. Seven years later, in 1702, over half of the castle burned in a fire set by troops of Charles XII of Sweden. After that fire, it was never rebuilt. About 1784, the ruined castle was purchased by Tomasz Jakliński. The last tenants left the devastated castle about 1810. The next owner was Ludwik Kozłowski, who used the remains of the castle as a source of building material and sold many items from castle to merchants.

The last proprietor of the castle was the neighbouring Wołoczyński and Antosiewicz family. After the Second World War, the castle was nationalized. The work to preserve the ruins and open them to visitors was started in 1949 and finished in 1973.

== Interesting facts ==
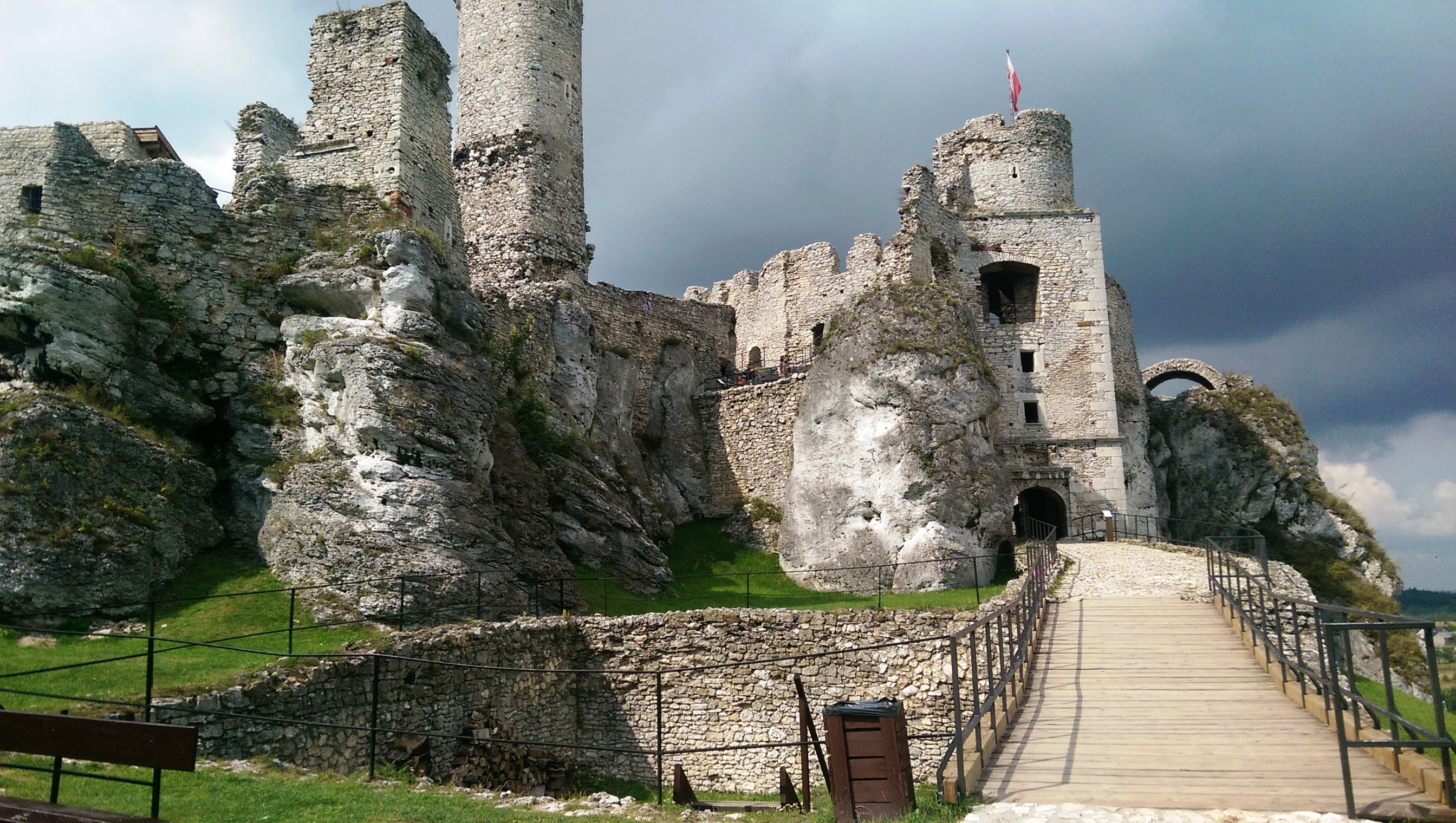
View of the ward.

On the bottom floor, fragments of the renaissance frescos of lilies are still visible.

Close to the castle, on the market of Podzamcze village, stands a chapel built from architectural elements (portal, volutes, cornice) of the castle. Inside the chapel are original elements of the castle chapel: the vault keystone, round shot said to have fallen into the castle during the Swedish Deluge (1655–1660), and a Renaissance Our Lady sculpture. The sculpture has been painted in the folk style (with oil paint) by the locals, obscuring its original appearance.

According to local folklore, the Ogrodzieniec Castle is haunted by the "Black Dog of Ogrodzieniec", seen prowling the ruins at night, pulling a heavy chain. The dog is said to be the soul of the Castellan of Kraków, Stanisław Warszycki, whose soul also supposedly haunts the ruins of the Dańków Castle, where it appears as a headless horseman.

== In film and television ==
In 1973, Ogrodzieniec Castle was used for outdoor scenes in television series Janosik.

In 1980, film The Knight by Lech Majewski was shot in the castle.

In 1984, the castle was used by the band Iron Maiden in their video feature Behind The Iron Curtain, as a backdrop for the song "Hallowed Be Thy Name".

In 1995, the castle was used to depict ruins of the old Spellbinder's castle in Australian television series Spellbinder.

In 2001, the ruins were used as scenery for Andrzej Wajda's film The Revenge. For the purpose of filmmaking, parts of the castle interiors were temporarily reconstructed. Those recreations remained in place for a time being even after the shooting ended.

In 2018, the ruins of the castle were used during filming of The Witcher – Netflix's 2019 series, starring Henry Cavill.

== Gallery ==
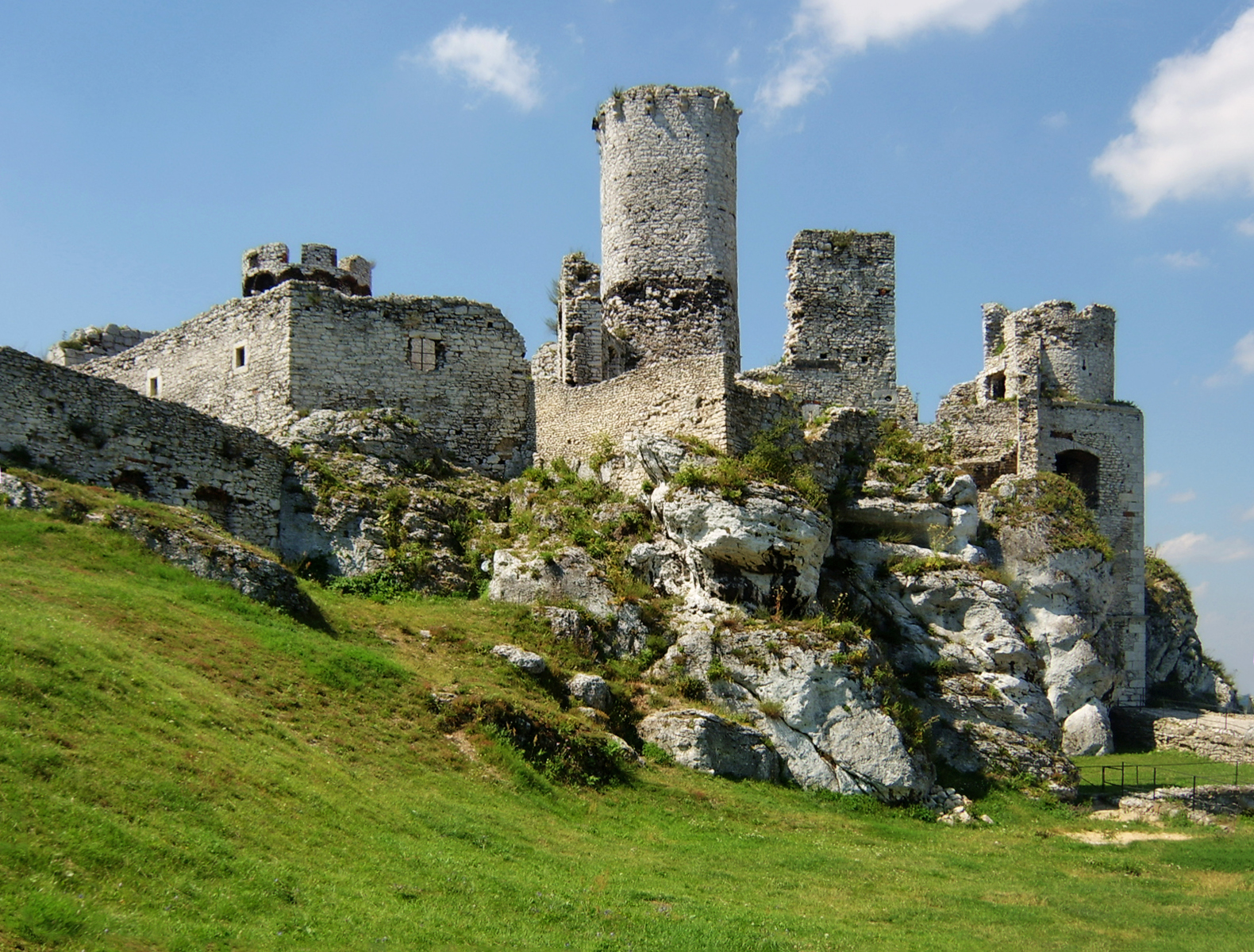
The Ogrodzieniec Castle- view from the East

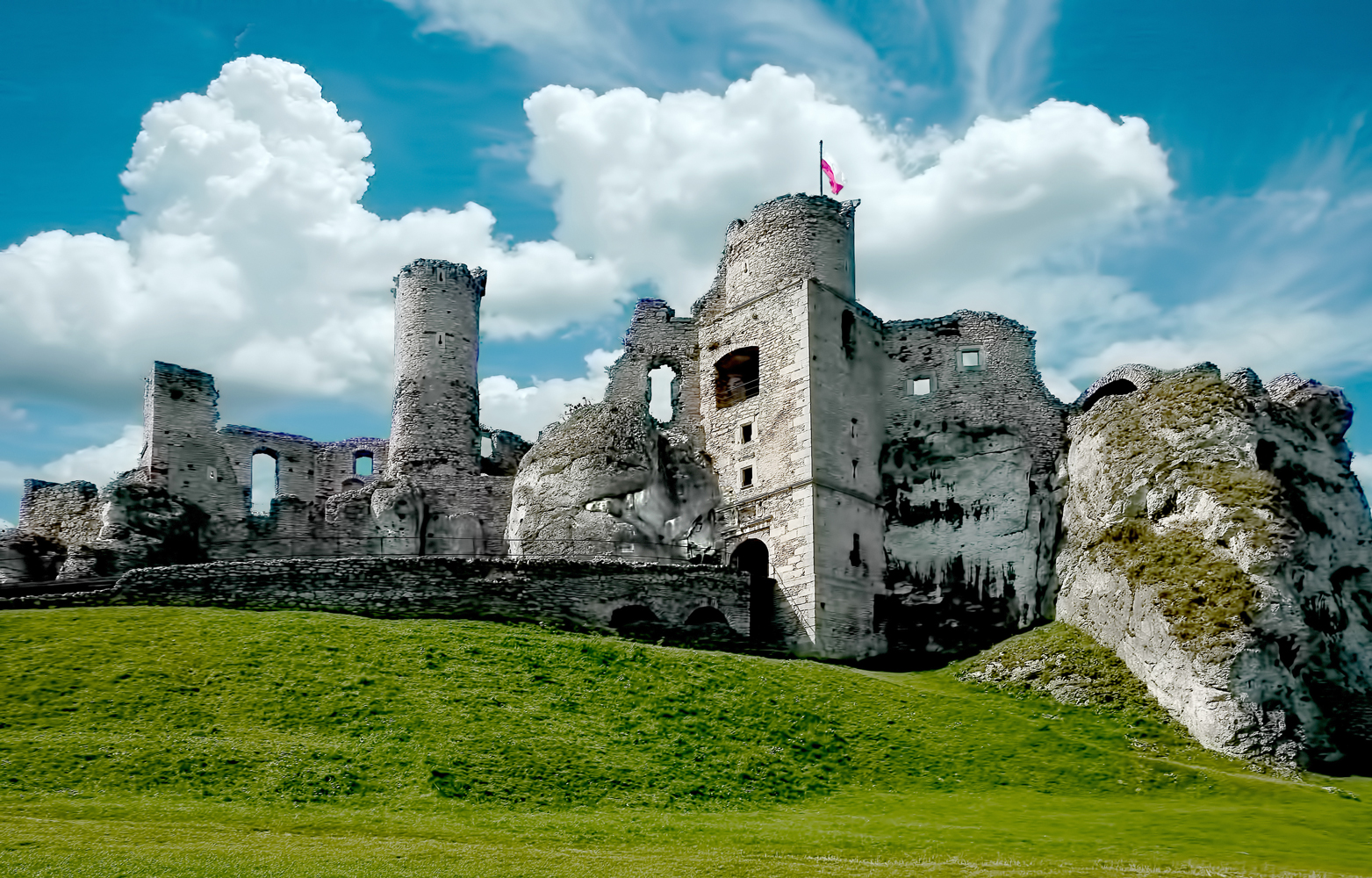
Panorama of the castle

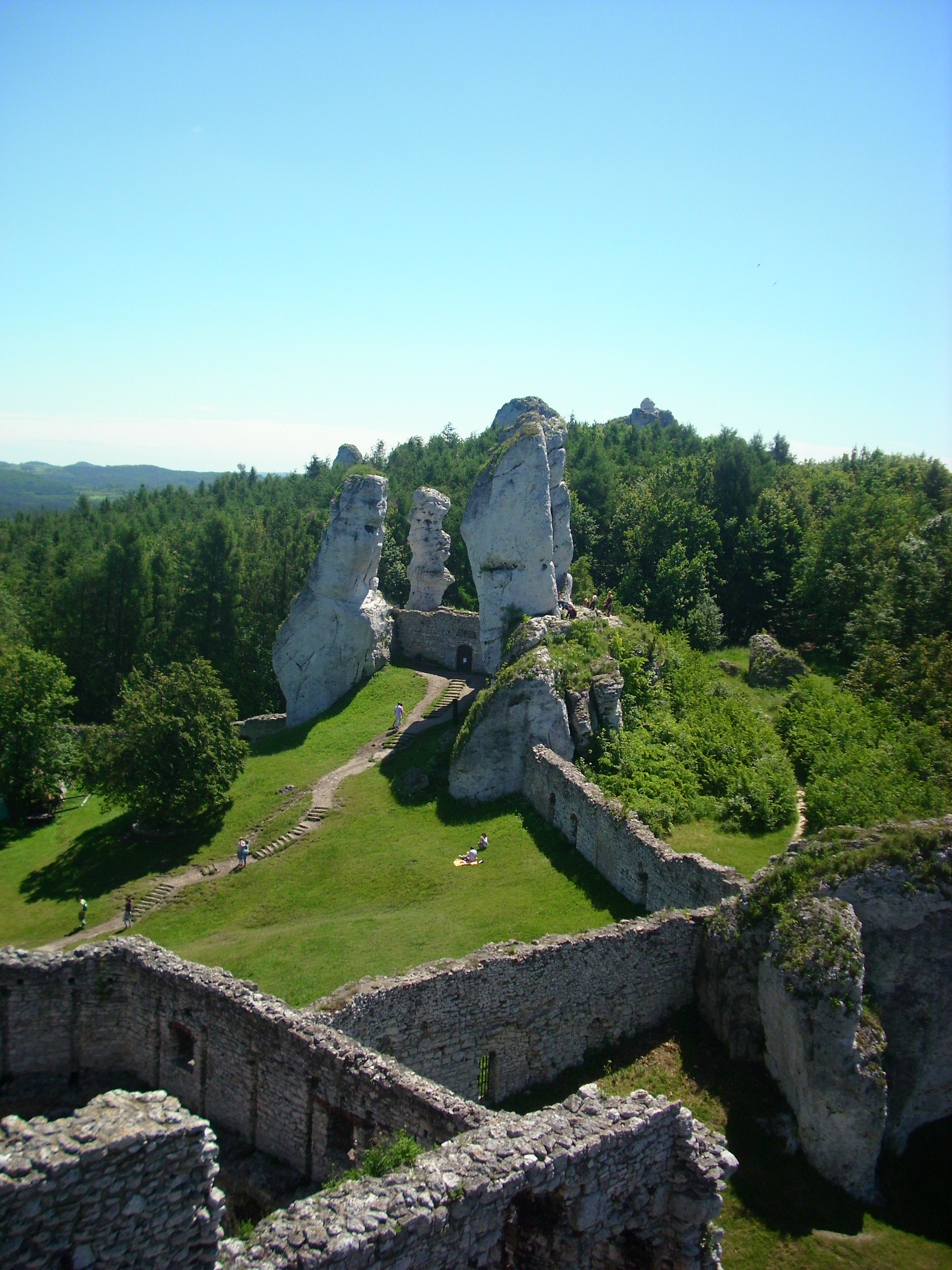
The torture chamber as seen from the tower

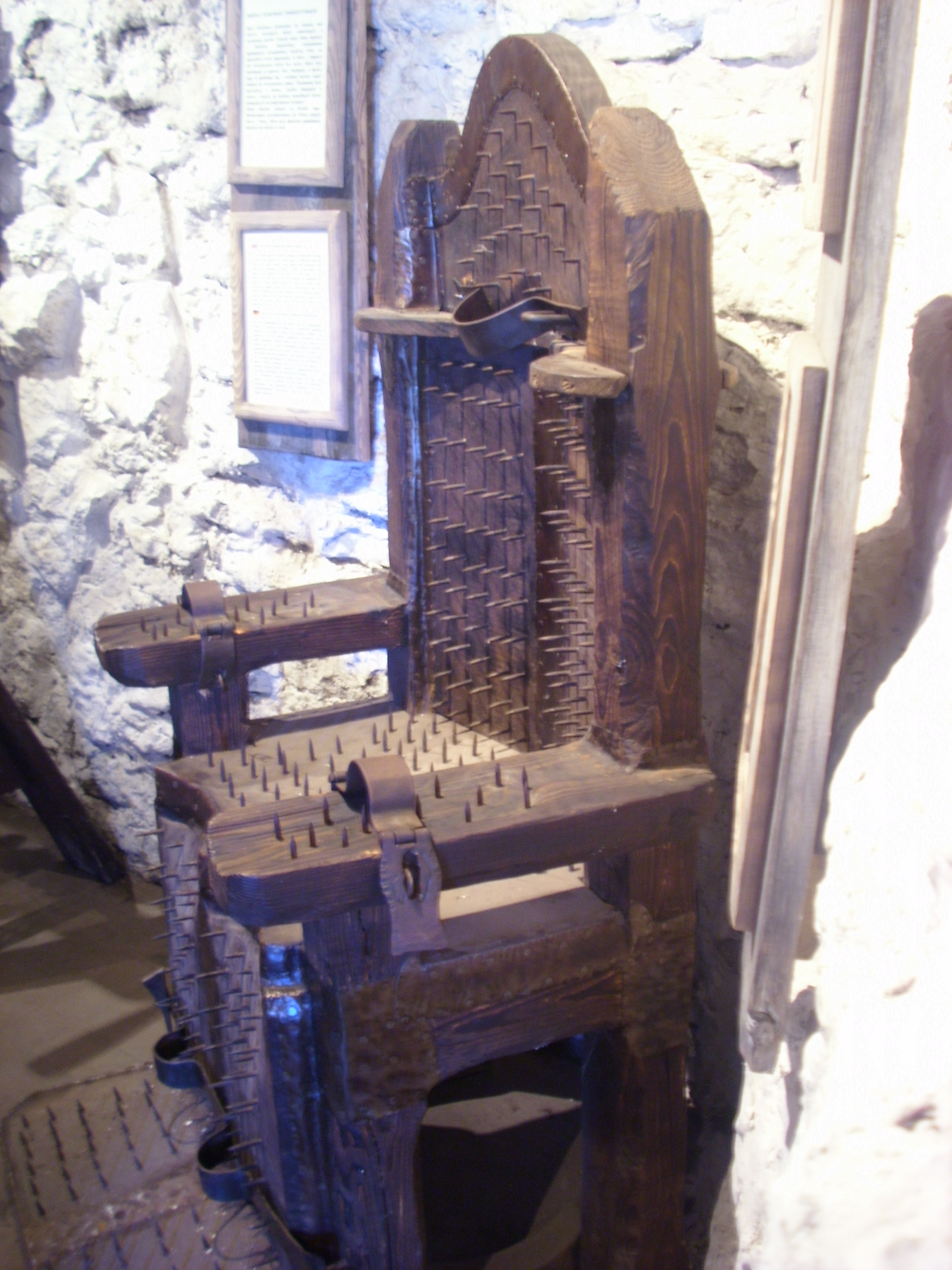
The torture chamber

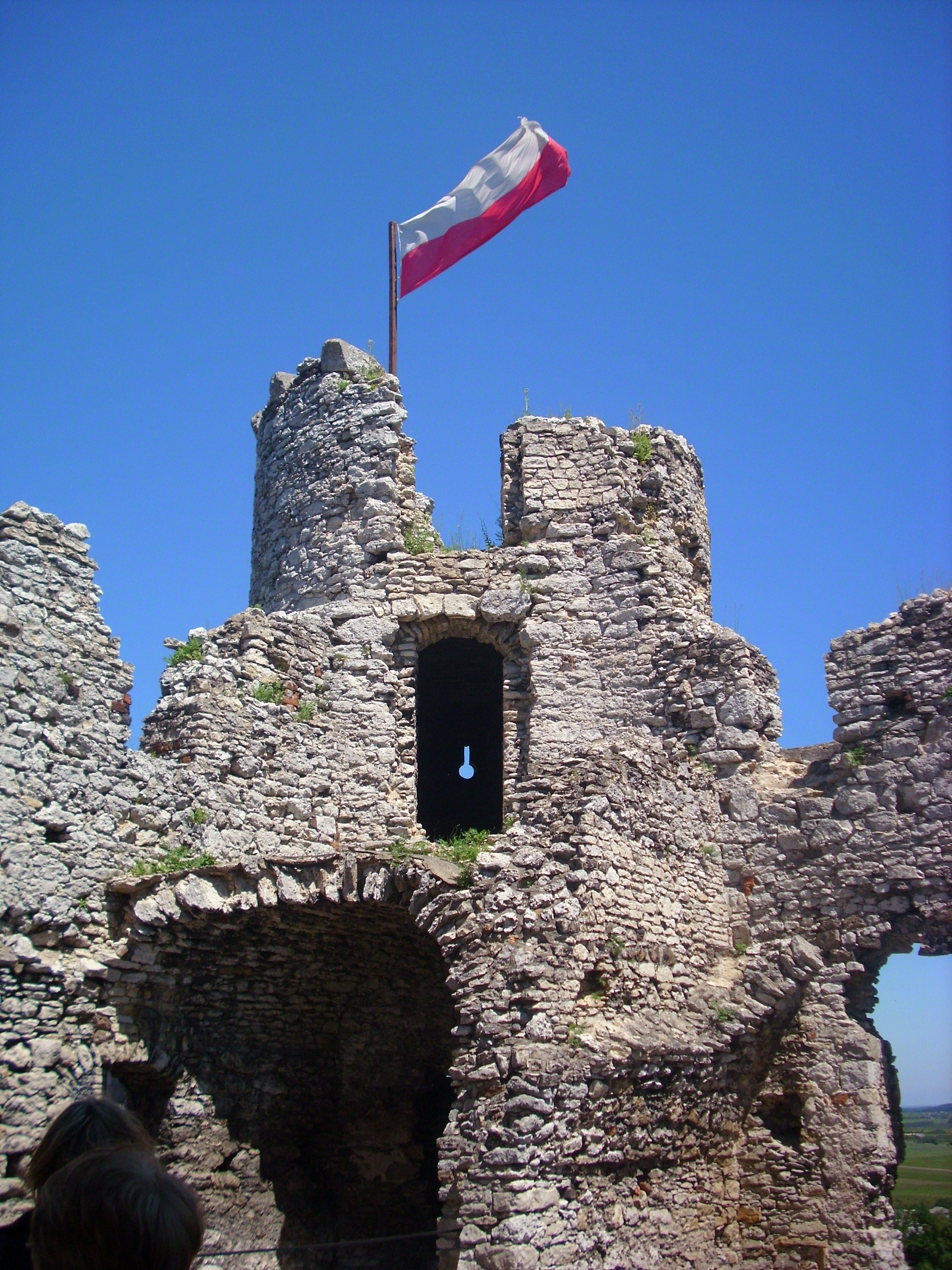
A tower of the Ogrodzieniec Castle with the Polish flag

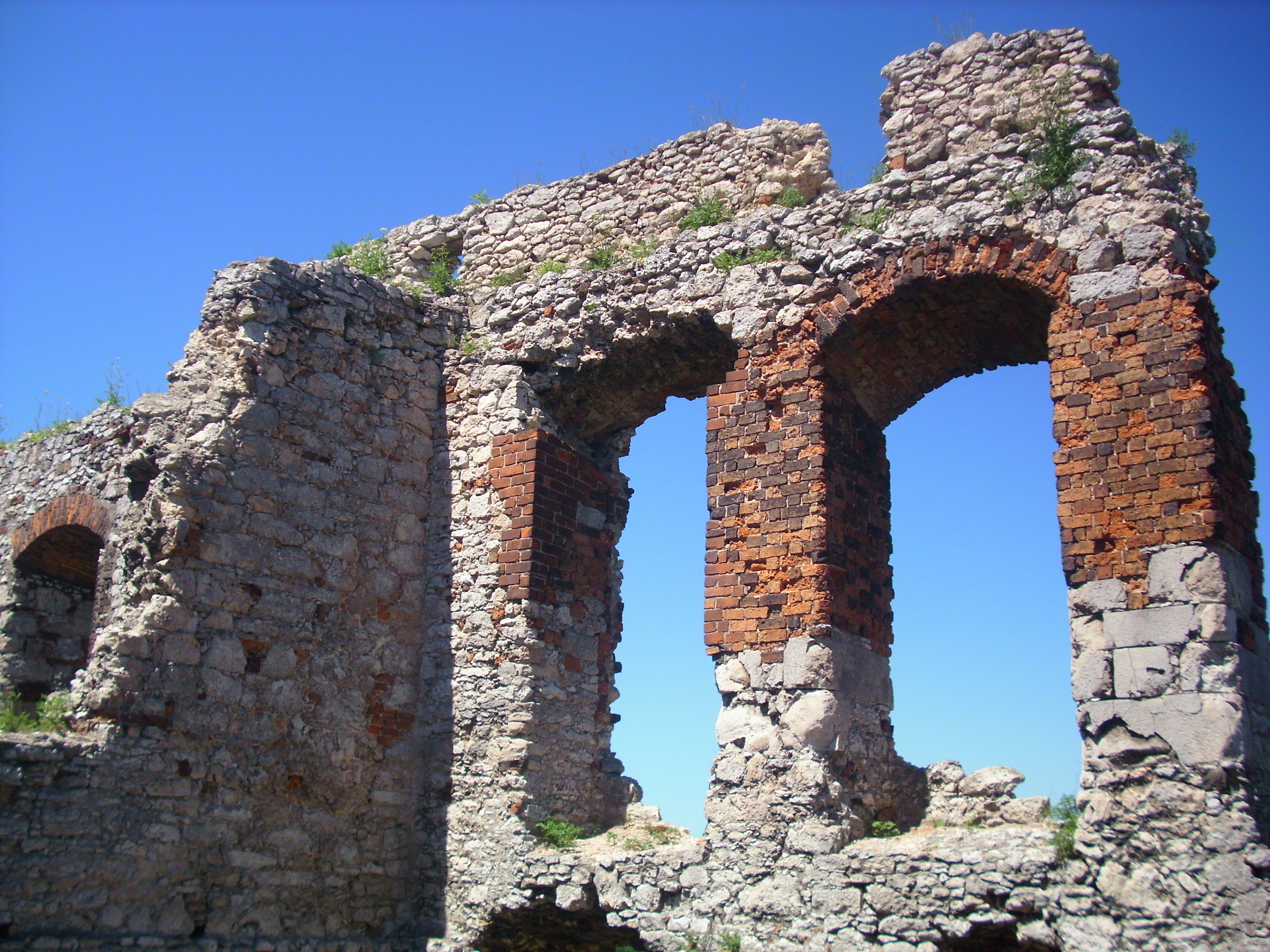
The castle windows

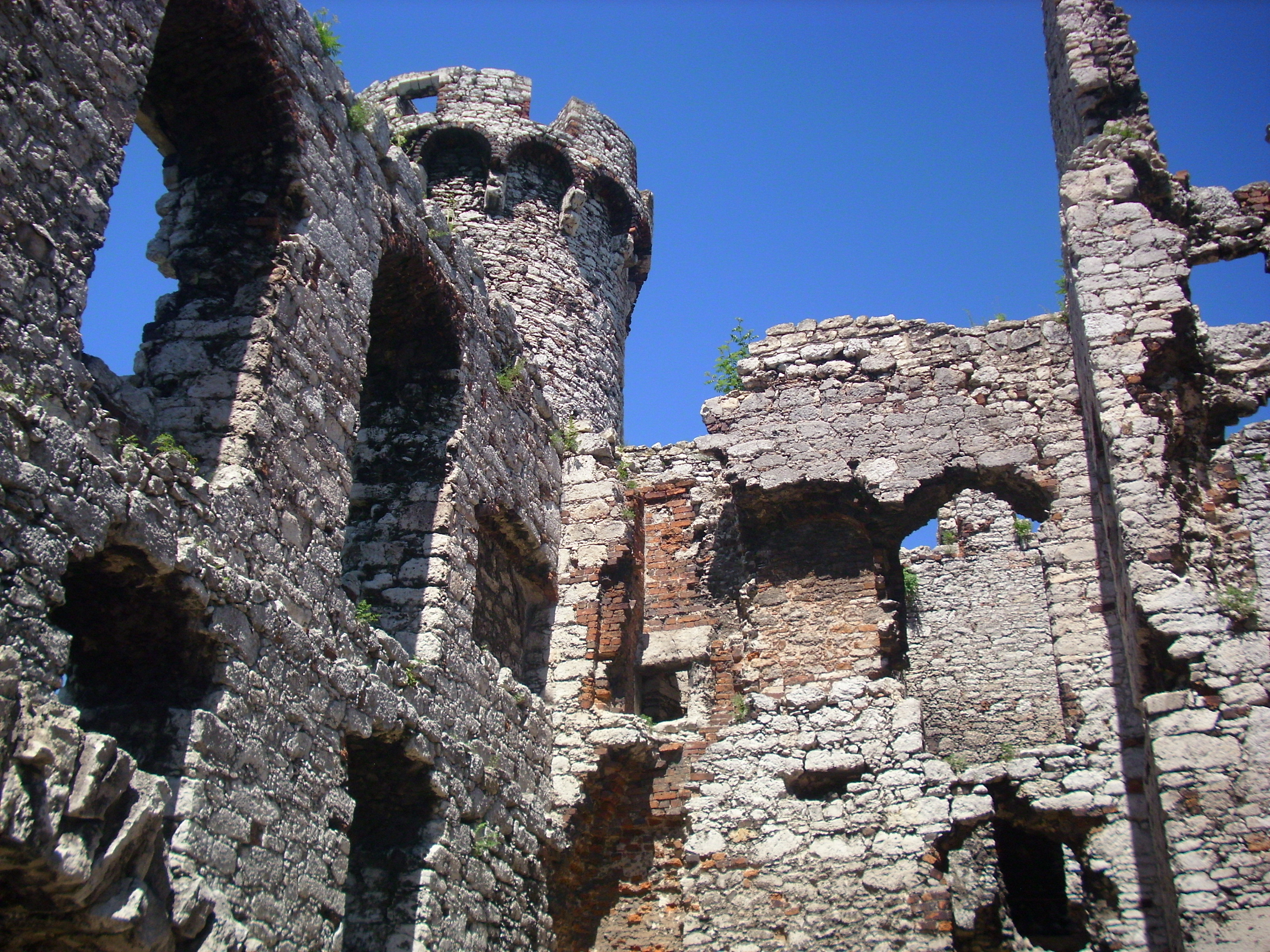
The castle walls

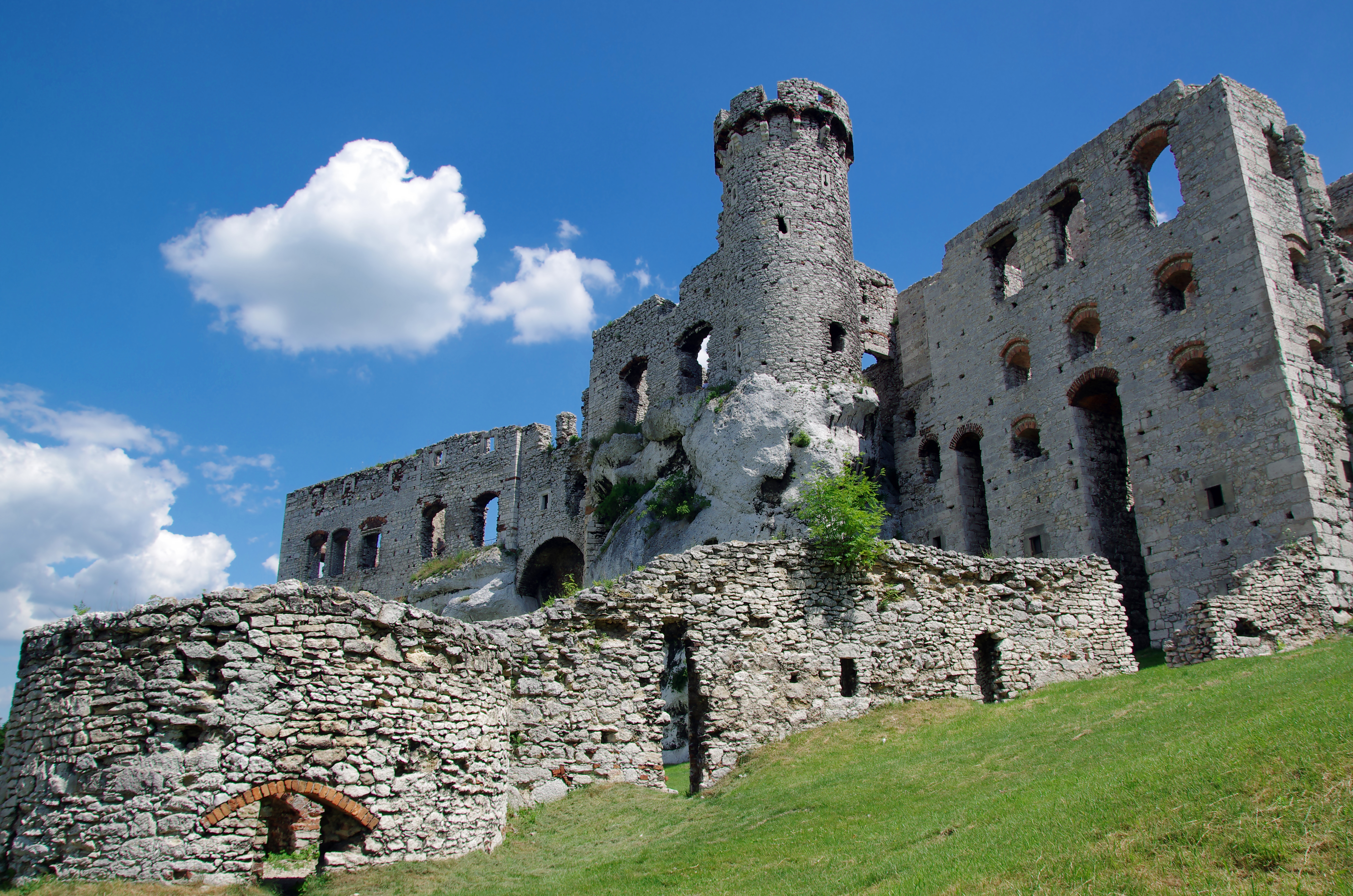
The castle walls

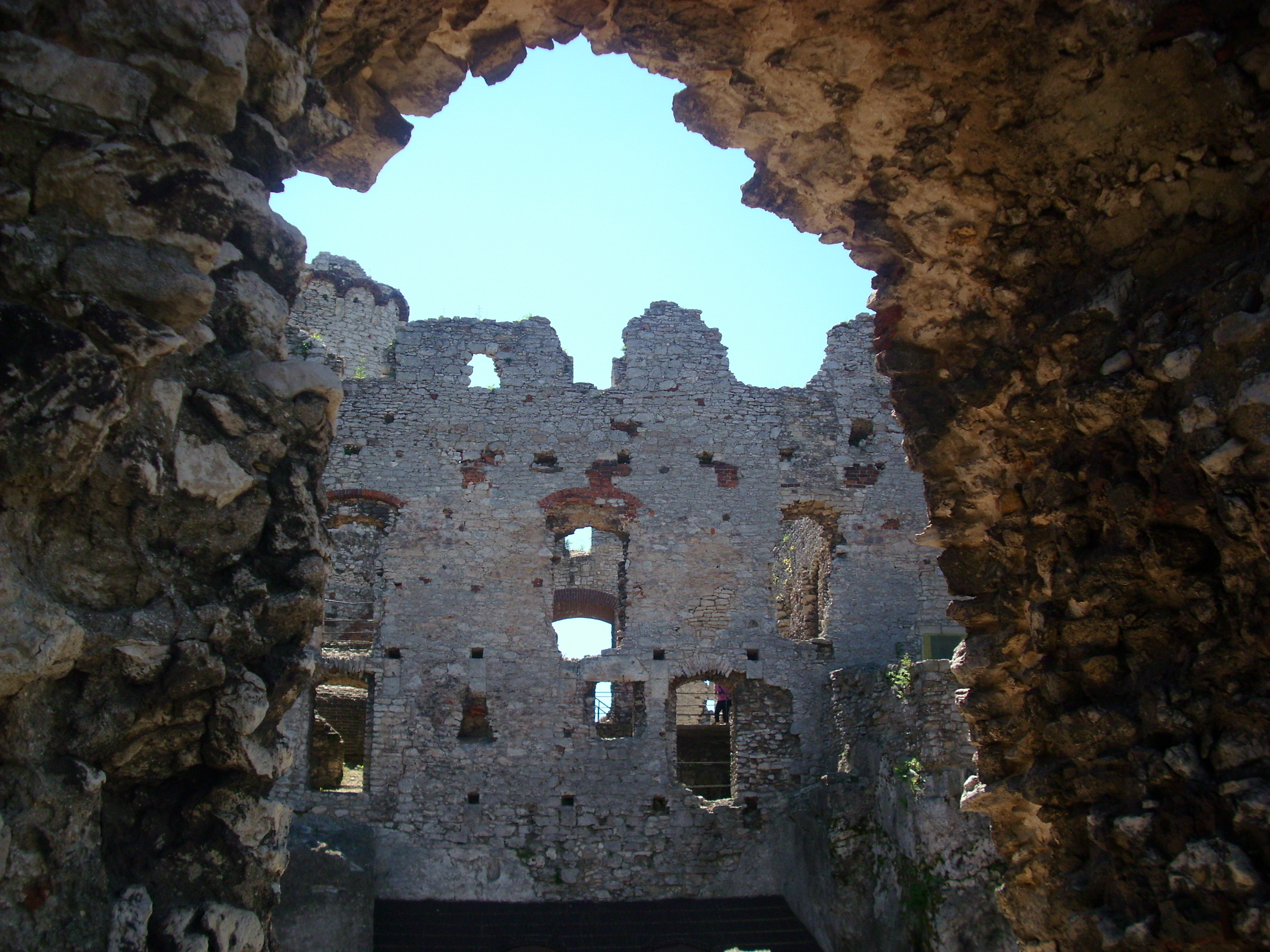
The castle walls

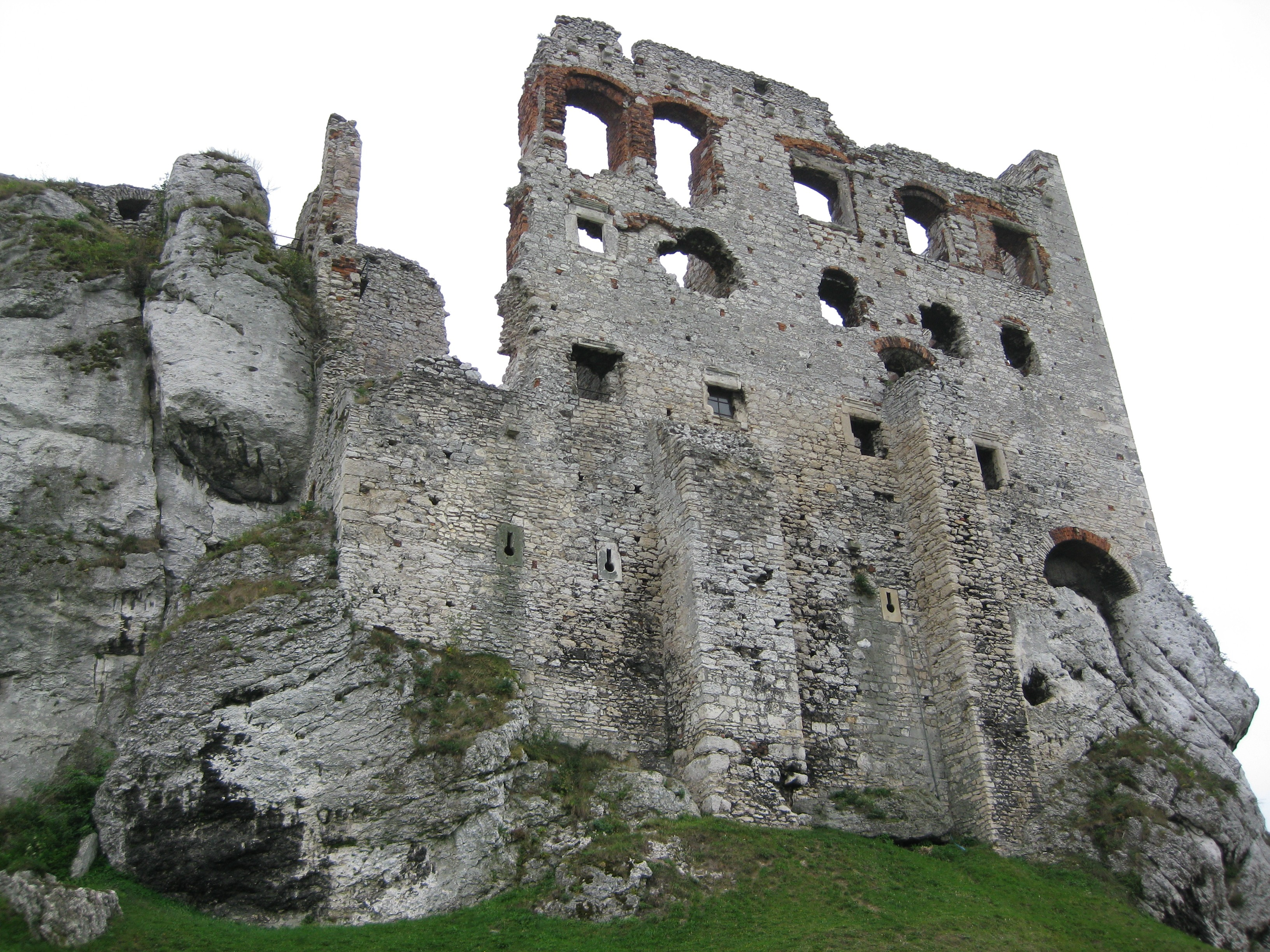
The South wall of the Ogrodzieniec Castle (2012-08-26)

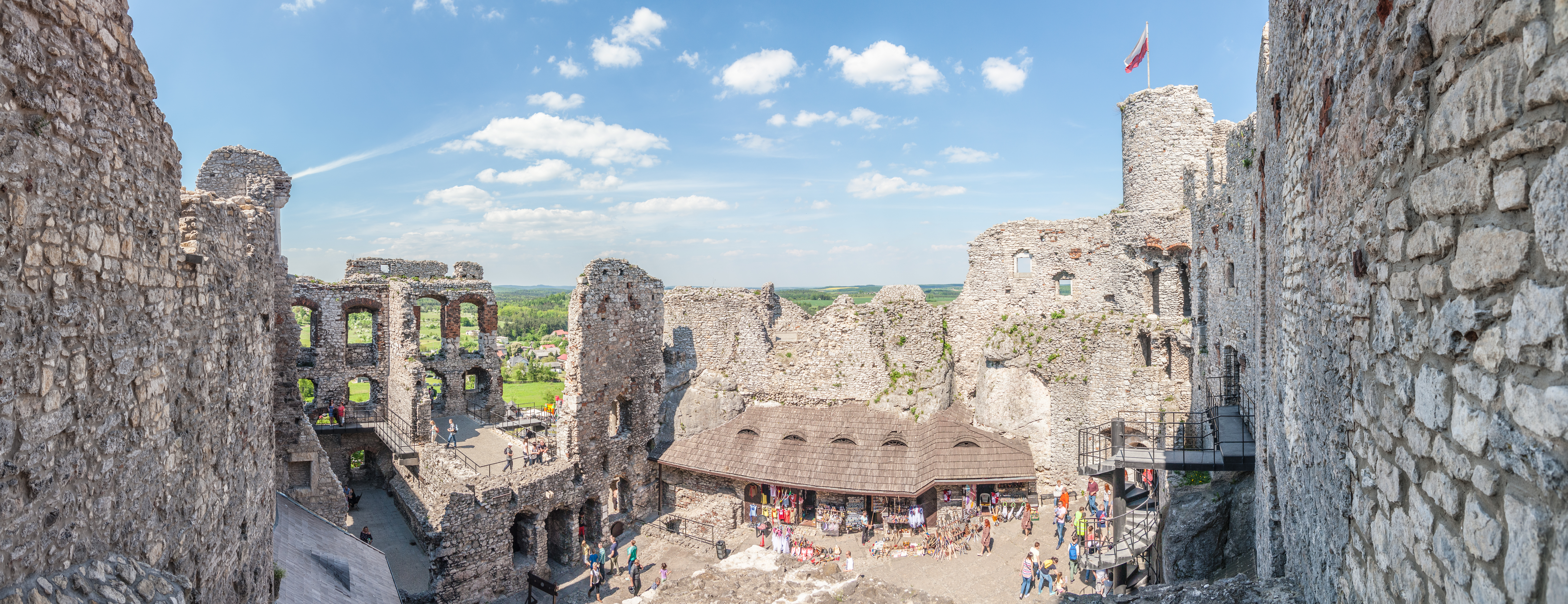
Inside castle

== See also ==
- Ogrodzieniec
- Trail of the Eagle's Nests
- Castles in Poland
