= Danków Castle =

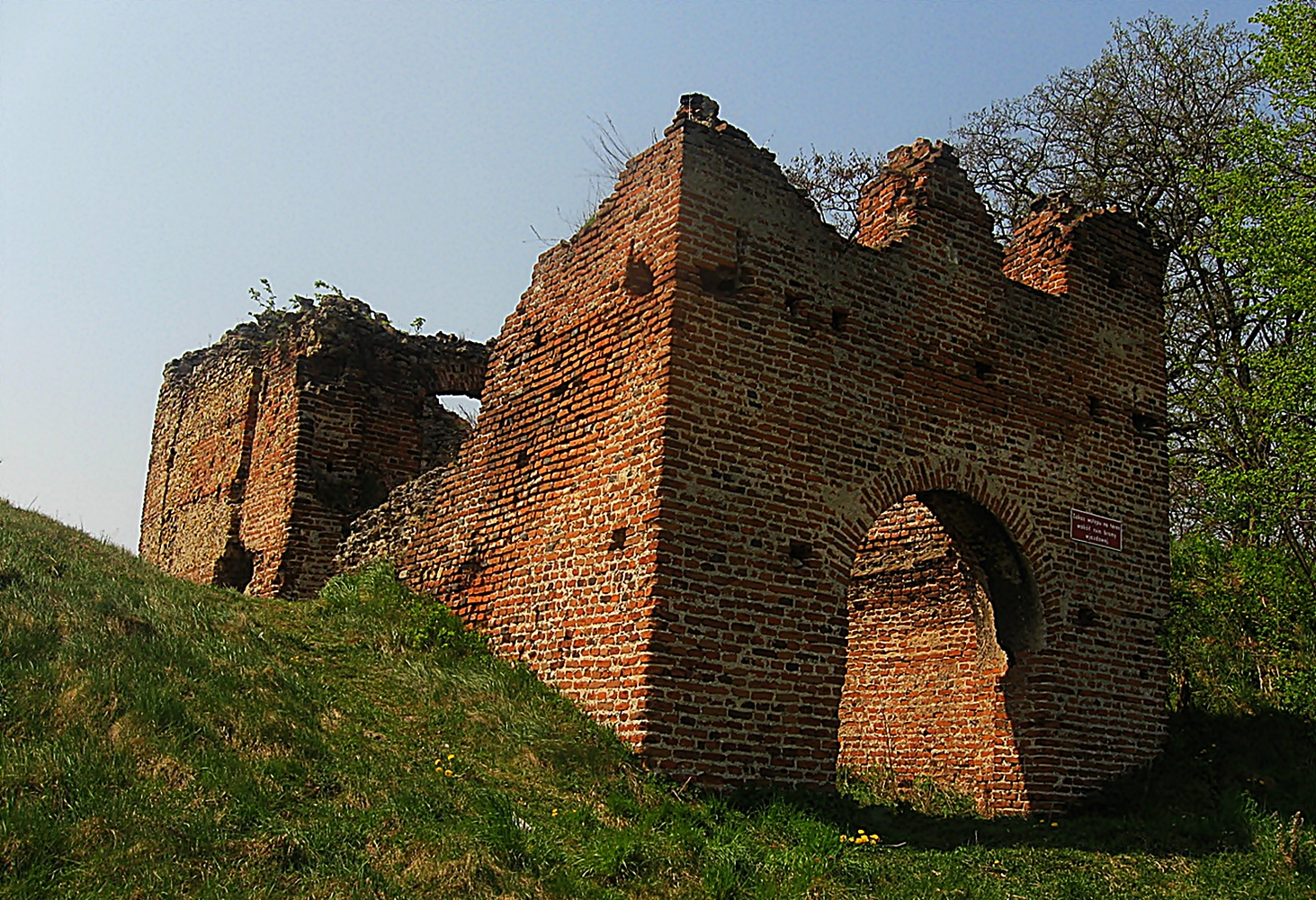
- Krzepicka Gate

- Location of the Danków Castle in Poland
- 50°59′55″N 18°48′02″E
- Location: Danków, Silesian Voivodeship, in Poland

History
- Built: 15th century

Site notes
- Architectural style: Gothic-Renaissance

Danków Castle - a fifteenth-century fortress, composed of bastions safeguarding a now non-existent Gothic-Renaissance castle ground.

In 1581, Danków passed into the ownership of the Warszycki family. In 1632, Stanisław Warszycki is said to have completed the construction of the castle’s early modern fortifications. He built a bastion fortress based on principles associated with the Old Dutch and French schools of military architecture. The fortifications are regarded as a rare example in Poland of the application of ideas formulated by the French military engineer Jean Errard de Bar-le-Duc. On the eastern side, the castle was protected by a large artificial lake. The most prominent building within the complex was the masonry Saint Stanislaus church, while the rest of the buildings have not yet been identified.

During the Swedish Deluge in 1655, the castle was probably not attacked by the Swedes and was one of the few places in Poland that remained unconquered. This may have resulted either from negotiations with the occupiers or from the fact that the fortress was exceptionally modern, heavily fortified, and well supplied. In 1657, Danków hosted King John II Casimir Vasa, Queen Marie Louise Gonzaga, Stefan Czarniecki, and senators returning to the country. For several months, the castle served as a political and administrative centre of the Polish–Lithuanian Commonwealth, where diplomatic negotiations were held, foreign envoys were received, and royal orders and correspondence were issued.

The castle later passed to Michał Warszycki and then to Stanisław Warszycki, Crown Sword-bearer. Through the dowry of his daughter Emercjanna, it came into the possession of the Lithuanian hetman Ludwik Konstanty Pociej, and after his death it was sold to the Poniński family, followed later by the Wessel family. In 1768, an inventory described the castle as ruined or abandoned. Within the fortifications there remained the large masonry church, a kitchen, a ruined storehouse, and brick cellars. In 1767, the remaining buildings had burned after a lightning strike. In the 19th century, the indebted estate was taken over by Joachim Kempner, and by 1823 the castle was already described as a ruin.

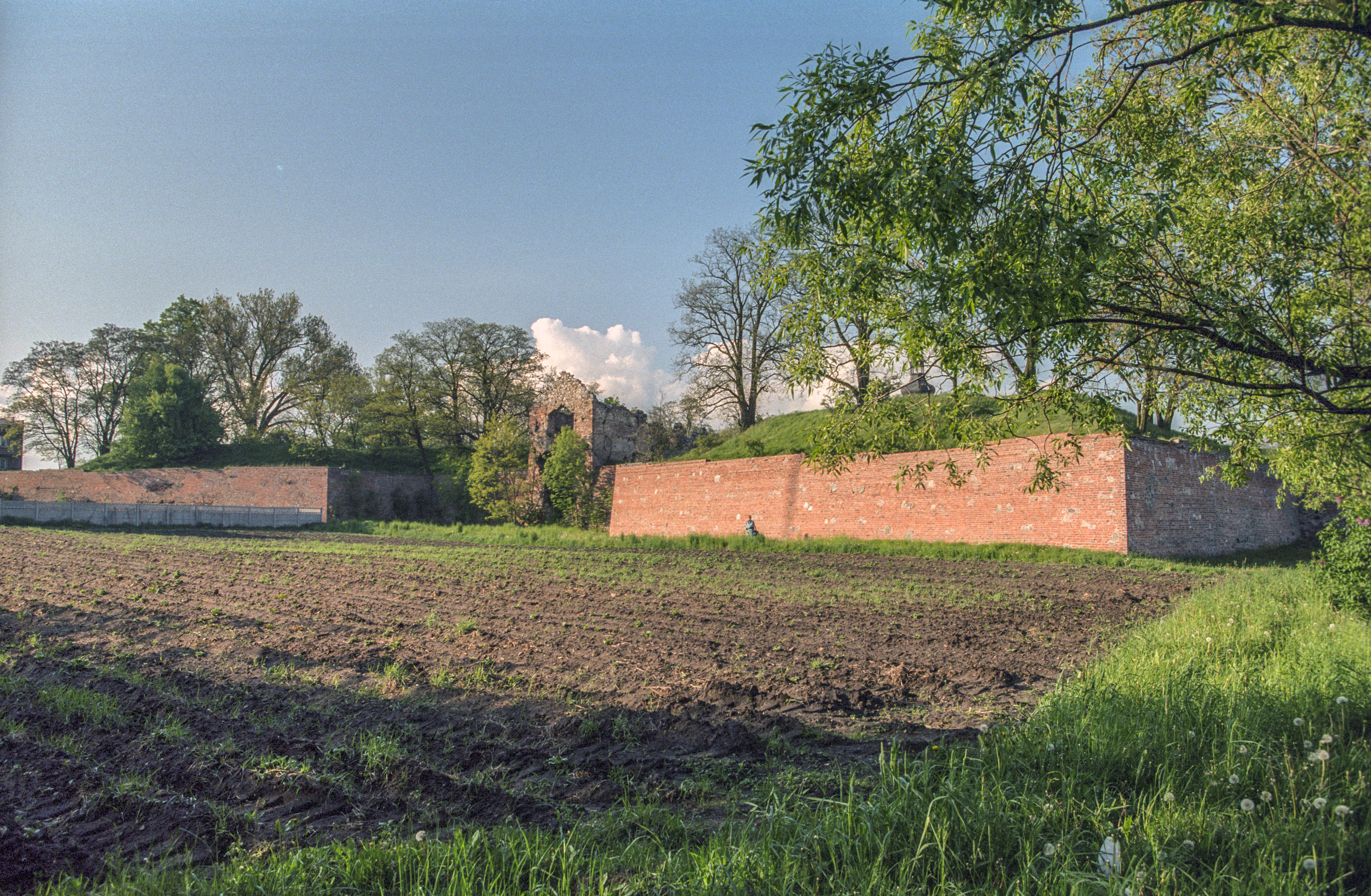
Castle gate and bastions
