= Stanisław Warszycki =

Stanisław Warszycki of Abdank coat of arms (c. 1600 – 1680/1681) was a noble (szlachcic) and magnate in the Polish–Lithuanian Commonwealth.

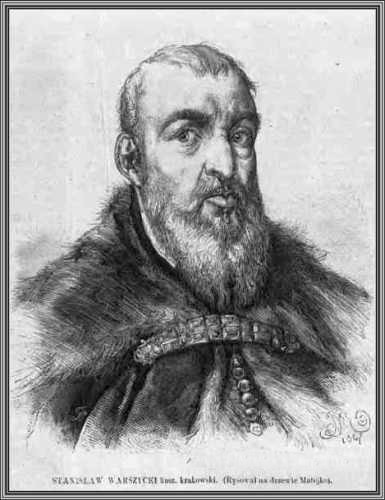
Portrait of Stanislaw Warszycki by Jan Matejko

Starosta of Piotrków, Voivode of Mazowsze (1630–1651), Castellan of Cracow (from 1651). He was known for his loyalty to his king and country, and gained fame as a good military commander and especially as a keen investor dedicated to developing his lands, but there are also many legends about his cruelty — although it is likely many of the latter were spread by his enemies. There are now several places in Poland which claim his ghost appears there.

== Biography ==
In his youth he studied at the University of Padua.

He was known for his interest in economics of his estates. He ordered the creation of many fishing ponds and canals, as well as manufactures: his estates supported several cloth and pottery manufacturers and brick factories. He encouraged the immigration of foreign craftsman to his estates. However it also appears that he or some of his overseers were responsible for some serfs' unrest; there are also legends of his cruelty towards the peasantry.

In 1632 he married Helena Wiśniowiecka, daughter of Konstanty Wiśniowiecki. Her dowry included estates at Pilica and Smoleńsk. They had one son, Jan Kazimierz Warszycki, and two daughters, Anna Helena and Teresa.

From 1632 he fortified his village of Danków to such an extent (moat, wall with towers) that it withheld the Swedish assault during the Swedish invasion of Poland. It was possibly not attacked by them, and remained Warszycki base of operations for the duration of the war. It was probably the only fortified village in the entire country. In his manor at Danków he received prominent personalities of his era, including king of Poland Jan II Kazimierz, queen Ludwika Maria Gonzaga, hetman Stefan Czarniecki (however, some sources indicate he received them at Pilica or Ogrodzienic), and other senators of Poland (he, as a voivode and later castellan, was a senator himself). Danków fortifications remained a notable place long after Warszycki's death, but by the 19th century the castle was in ruins and today only ruins of outer walls remain.

In 1651 he expanded the fortifications at Pilica castle. He is generally known for constructing, rebuilding or expanding many fortifications in his dominions. He also sponsored the construction of at least one church and donated money to the Jagiellonian University.

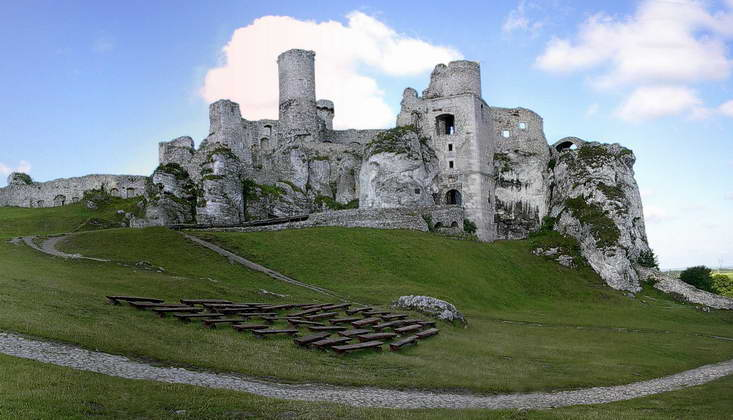
The castle ruins at Ogrodzieniec, one of many castles owned by Warszycki.

He remained loyal to the Polish state during the war with Sweden (when many powerful magnates defected to the Swedish side). He recaptured the castle at Pilica from the Swedish commander Lindorn. He relieved his manor at Danków and forced the Swedes to retreat from Krzepice and Ogrodzieniec. He took part in the defence of Częstochowa, where Swedes laid siege to the Jasna Góra Monastery. Stanisław sent some of his men with provisions (cows) and 12 cannons to defend the monastery.

During the Polish counteroffensive against the Swedes he took part in the fights against the Swedes in Siewierszczyzna (Severia). At some point he was ambushed by another magnate, Orzechowski. Warszycki barely escaped with his life and sued Orzechowski before the Crown Tribunal. Despite royal support for Orzechowski, Warszycki succeeded in securing a death penalty for his enemy. Although he gave Orzechowski the chance to evade the penalty if he would renounce his faith (he was a Polish brother), Orzechowski refused and consequently was executed by a firing squad.

In 1669 he bought from Mikołaj Firlej for 267,000 zlotys estates at Ogrodzieniec, Bydlin, Włodowice, Kromołów, Zawiercie, and silver mines near Olkusz. He spent much of his fortune rebuilding what was damaged during the Swedish invasion, including the castle at Ogrodzieniec.

He was known as a mediator and was active in the politics of Poland. Once, when an illness made him too weak to move, he ordered to be carried from Radom to Pilica to a Sejm (session of Polish parliament).

His and his wife's epitaphs are to be found in Jasna Góra.

== Folklore ==
Warszycki became a rather prominent character in many legends. Danków was said to have vast dungeons filled with treasures and in contemporary Poland there were stories that Warszycki sold his soul to the Devil to enlist his help in the construction of the fortifications. The Devil supposedly took him to hell before he died.

His enemies also accused him of being cruel to his peasants; in Ogrodzienic he presumably constructed a 'cave of tortures'. Another story tells of how he became furious that his wife received a male guest, and suspecting them of an affair, blew up part of the castle. According to a variant of that story, he immured the unfaithful wife, before blowing up that part of the castle. Another just limits the penalty to public flagellation. An alternative reason for his cruelty against his wife is that she attempted to poison him. Yet another story describes his greedy side and how he promised his daughter, Barbara, a dowry and then gave her nothing out of greed and spite. Or, in yet another variant, he had nothing to give because his treasures mysteriously disappeared. Whether he hid them, or they were stolen, or the devil took them... who knows.

Many of his former possessions have legends centered around him being a ghost. He haunts especially the Ogrodzieniec and Olsztyn castles, with chains, black dogs, and various accessories (sources vary).

On the other hand, there is a story about a great feast he once held for the poor people. He invited them to his castle in Pilica, ordered them to take a bath and gave them clean clothes. The source seems to indicate he also sponsored a charity in Pilica. To make matters more confusing, a female ghost immured in the castle is also rumored to appear at Pilica; her connection to Warszycki family is not known.

There is at least one story connected to his son, Jan Kazimierz, telling he was an extreme womanizer and his first wife left him on the very day of their marriage.

It is unknown if any of those stories bear much truth, they may also be connected to other members of his family, several of which also bore his name.

At least one story gives the year 1697 for the event, thus it would most certainly be related to a later Stanisław Warszycki. This story tells how that Stanisław wanted to buy a certain village. When its owner refused, Stanisław invited him and held a series of feasts and festivals for the guests over the period of several weeks. When the other noble returned home, he discovered that Warzycki's people have moved the entire village to his lands. When he returned to complain, Warszycki paid him a good price but refused to return the villagers.
