= Siege of Jasna Góra =

Part of the Second Northern War (1655)

Coordinates: 50.812569°N 19.097371°E

- Part of the Northern War of 1655–1660
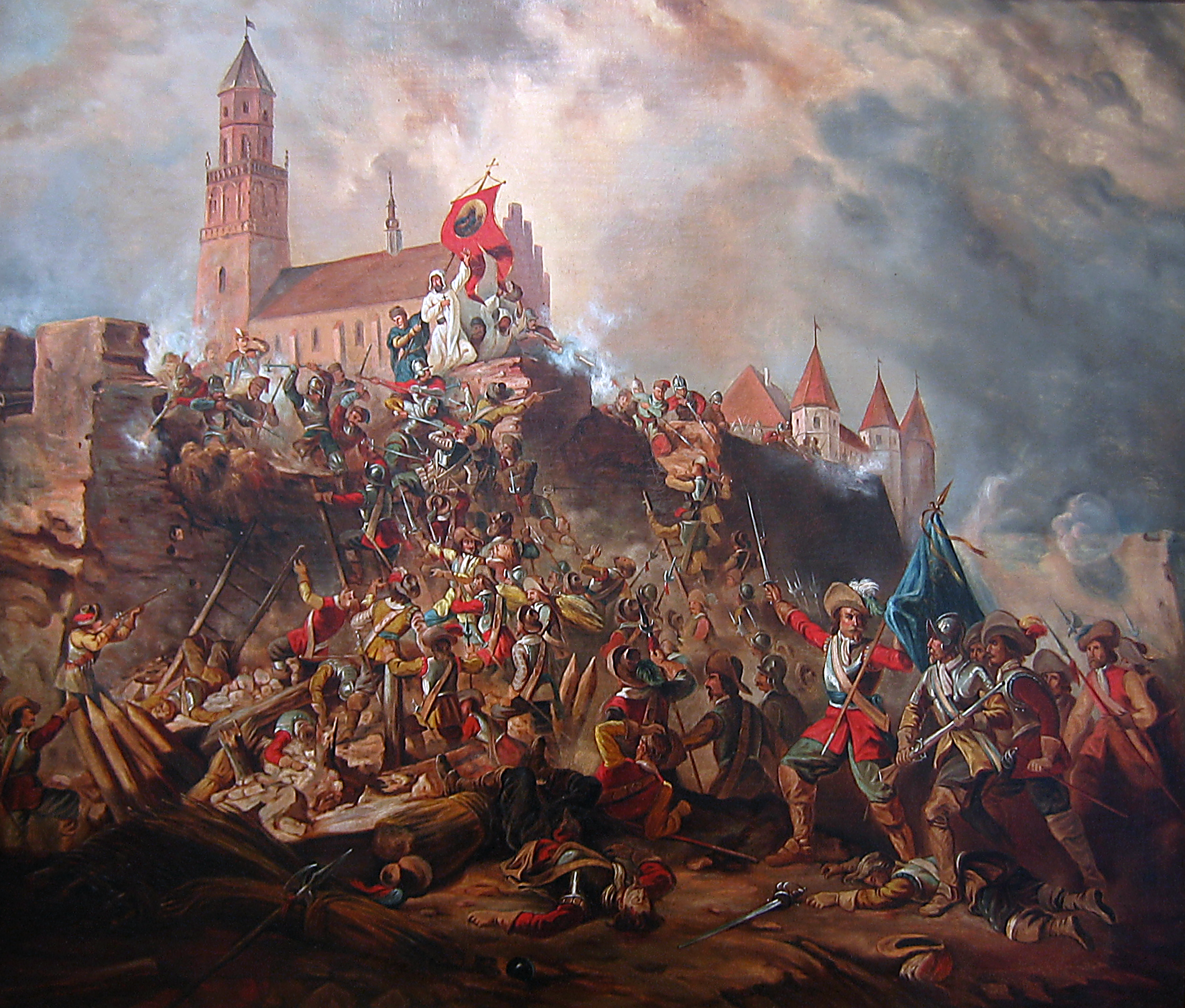
- The Siege of Clari Montis (Jasna Góra) in 1655. Franciszek Kondratowicz, XIX century
| Date | 18 November – 27 December 1655 |
| Location | Częstochowa, Kraków Voivodeship, Polish–Lithuanian Commonwealth |
| Result | Polish–Lithuanian victory |

Belligerents
| Swedish Empire | Polish–Lithuanian Commonwealth |

Commanders and leaders
| (Swedish Empire) Burchard von Lühnen | Augustyn Kordecki; Stanisław Warszycki |

Strength
| 3,200 | 310 |

Casualties and losses
| 300 killed and wounded | 12 killed and wounded |

The siege of Jasna Góra (also known less accurately as the battle of Częstochowa, Polish: Oblężenie Jasnej Góry) took place in the winter of 1655 during the Second Northern War, or 'The Deluge' – as the Swedish invasion of the Polish–Lithuanian Commonwealth is known. The Swedes were attempting to capture the Jasna Góra monastery in Częstochowa. Their month-long siege, however, was unsuccessful, as a small force consisting of monks from the Jasna Góra monastery led by their Prior and supported by local volunteers, mostly from the szlachta (Polish nobility), fought off the numerically superior Germans (who were hired by Sweden), saved their sacred icon, the Black Madonna of Częstochowa, and, according to some accounts, turned the course of the war.

== Prelude ==
The decade of the 1650s marked the end of the Golden Age of Poland, as it had become embroiled in a series of wars, particularly the Chmielnicki Uprising and the Russo-Polish War (1654–1667). In 1655 the Swedes decided to take advantage of the weakness of the Commonwealth to revive the Polish-Swedish War, which had been simmering for the past century. The Swedish forces quickly overran much of the Commonwealth territory. In late 1655 the Polish king, John II Casimir, took refuge in Habsburg Silesia, in the Głogówek Castle. Despite that, the Commonwealth forces were still not defeated, and the Swedes decided to secure the fortified Jasna Góra monastery, an important fortress near the Silesian border, well known for its riches.

On 6 August 1655, on this grim news, a council of war was held in the monastery of Jasna Gora under the leadership of Teofil Bronowski, the Priorship of Augustine Kordecki, and garrison commander of the fortress Colonel Jan Pawl, coat-of-arms Cellari. We begin the preparations of the fortified monastery of Jasna Gora for armed defense.

— Nova Gigantomachia in Claro Monte Czestochoviensi, 1658

As the Swedes approached, the monks feared that the Protestants would loot their Catholic sanctuary, seeing as the great European religious war of the 17th century, the Thirty Years' War, had barely ended. Thus the sacred icon was replaced with a copy and the original moved on November 7 in secret to the castle in Lubliniec, and later to the Pauline monastery in Mochów between the towns of Prudnik and Głogówek. The monks also bought about 60 muskets, and ammunition, and hired 160 soldiers to support the 70 fighting-capable monks. The defence forces were also aided by about 80 volunteers, among them 20 nobles, including Stanisław Warszycki. The monastery had good artillery: 12–18 light cannons (from 2 to 6 pounders) and twelve 12 pounders.

In the meantime the Swedes, seeing that they could not take the monastery by surprise, attempted to negotiate. On November 8 the Swedes (300 cavalry under Jan Wejhard) requested the right to garrison the monastery; however, they were refused the right to enter. The Prior of the monastery, Augustyn Kordecki, while repeatedly requesting aid from the King of Poland, John II Casimir, offered to recognise Charles X Gustav of Sweden as King to prevent a military conflict. He received a document from the Swedes that promised safety to the monastery, but on November 18 he refused to let another Swedish unit in. The Swedish commander, General Burchard Müller von der Luhnen, with a 2,250-strong force (1,800 cavalry, 100 dragoons, 300 infantry and 50 artillerymen) with 10 cannons (albeit light — eight 6 pounders and two 4 pounders), after futile negotiations with Kordecki, decided to start the siege, which would continue until the night of December 26 to 27.

== Battle ==
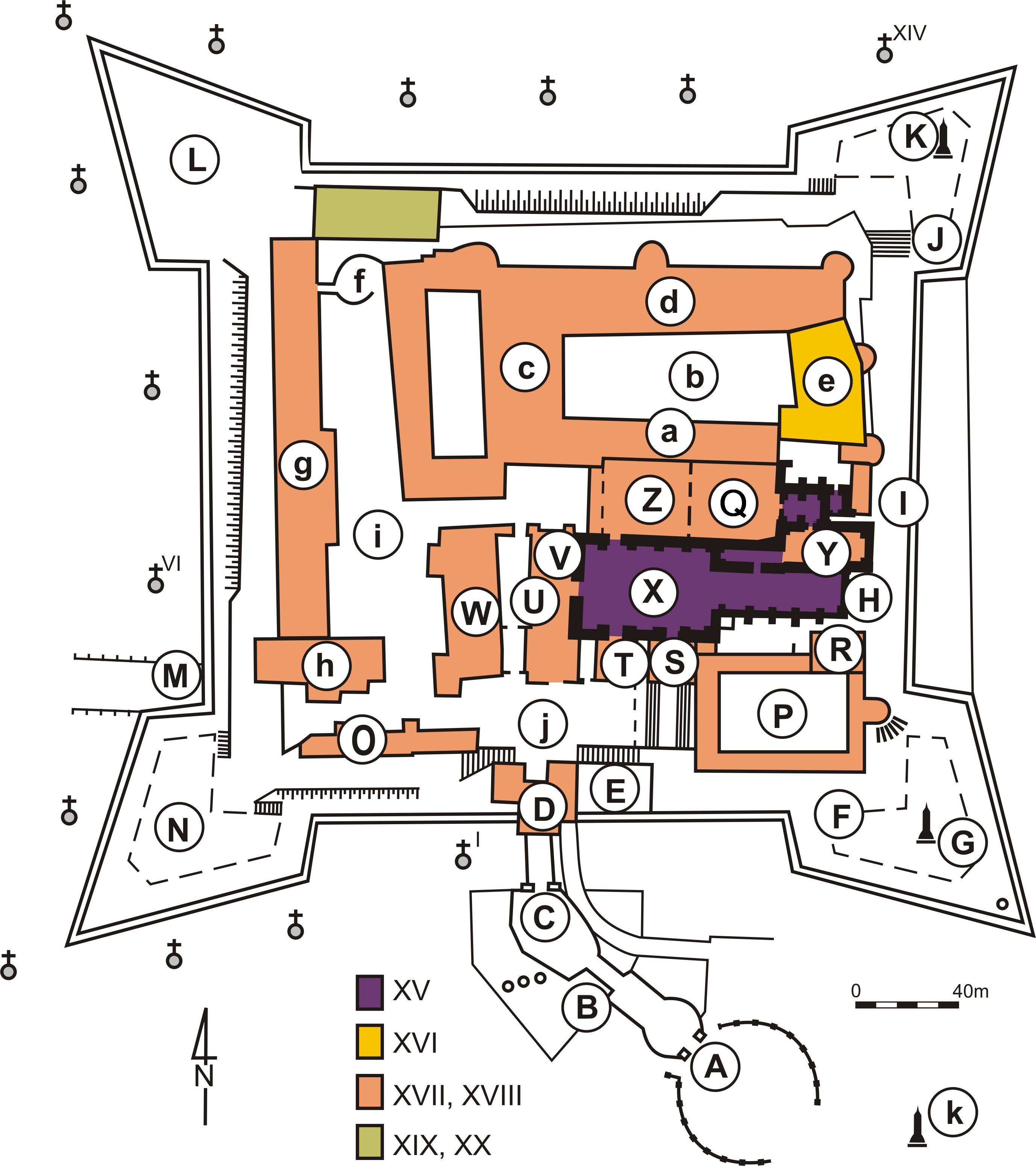
Plan of Jasna Góra monastery. Click on the image to see more detailed explanation.

The siege began on November 18. The Swedes had a numerical advantage, but inferior artillery compared to that mounted in the monastery. On November 28 the besieged under the leadership of Piotr Czarniecki made a surprise sortie and destroyed two Swedish cannons. Negotiations followed, which bore no fruit – the Swedes arrested two monks but released them afterwards. As Kordecki did not agree to surrender the monastery, the fighting resumed. Near the end of November the Swedes received reinforcements – about 600 men with 3 cannons. On December 10 the Swedes brought in heavy siege artillery – two 24-pounders and 4 12-pounders, with 200 men. The Swedes finally had heavier caliber artillery than the defenders, although they still had fewer cannons than the monastery. At that point the Swedish besiegers were at the height of their strength, with 3,200 men (including 800 Poles who served the Swedish king) and 17 cannons. The Swedish army at Jasna Góra, although commonly referred to as 'the Swedes', was in fact mostly composed of German mercenaries. With the new artillery the Swedes significantly damaged the northern walls, as well as the bastion of Holy Trinity.

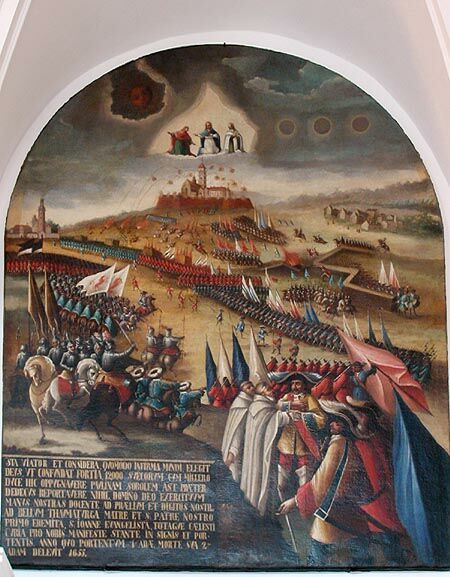
Swedish siege of Jasna Góra in 1655. Oil on canvas, 17th century. Malarnia Jasnogórska, Jasna Góra, Sala Rycerska.

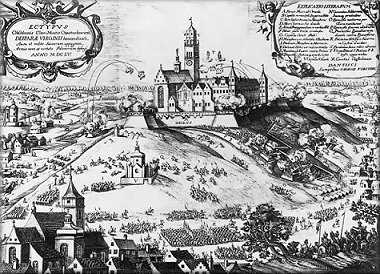
Defence of Jasna Góra, engraving reproduction.

On 14 December the Poles made another sortie, destroying one of the Swedes' redoubts as well as one of the 24-pounders. The Swedes then started to shell the south side, as well as digging tunnel. On December 20, the Poles led by Stefan Zamoyski sortied again, this time during the day shortly after noon. They destroyed two cannons and killed most of the miners at the tunnel. On December 24 Kordecki refused to surrender once again, and the Swedes went back to shelling the northern side. During one of their most heavy barrages the second of their 24-pounders malfunctioned and was destroyed.

The Swedes then demanded a ransom of 60,000 talars to lift the siege, but Kordecki replied that while he would have paid before the fighting, the monastery now needed the money for repairs. Finally, on December 27, the Swedes decided to withdraw. They made several small attempts to take the monastery by surprise in the weeks to come, as the fortress became an increasingly important center for the local anti-Swedish guerrillas. The Polish side reported a few dozen casualties, while the Swedes, several hundred.

== Aftermath ==
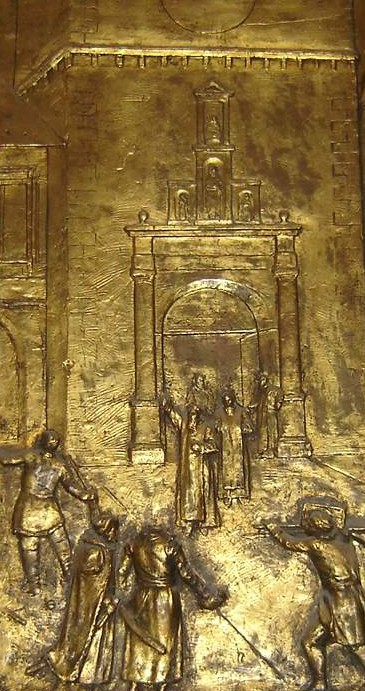
Defence of Jasna Gora. Nineteenth century relief

The fortified Jasna Góra monastery was the only stronghold in Poland that the Swedish invaders failed to capture. Historians disagree over the importance of the defence of Jasna Góra in turning the tide of the war. In December, when the Swedes lifted their siege, the Polish forces had begun to gain the upper hand, and the defence of Jasna Góra, an important symbol for the Poles, was certainly a significant morale boost. However, to what extent the defence of Jasna Góra motivated the defenders is still an open issue.

In 1658 Augustyn Kordecki published a book, Nova Gigantomachia in Claro Monte Czestochoviensi, in which he focused on the importance of the defense of Jasna Góra. A year later, Polish author Stanisław Kobierzycki built upon his description in Obsidio Clari Montis Częstochoviensis. In the nineteenth century, the defense of the monastery became widely popularized in a novel, The Deluge, by Henryk Sienkiewicz, one of the most popular Polish writers of his time and a Nobel Prize-winner (a 1974 movie was based on the novel).

The siege of Jasna Gora is commemorated on the Tomb of the Unknown Soldier, Warsaw, with the inscription "JASNA GORA 18 XI-26 XII 1655".
