= Augustyn Kordecki =

Polish prior

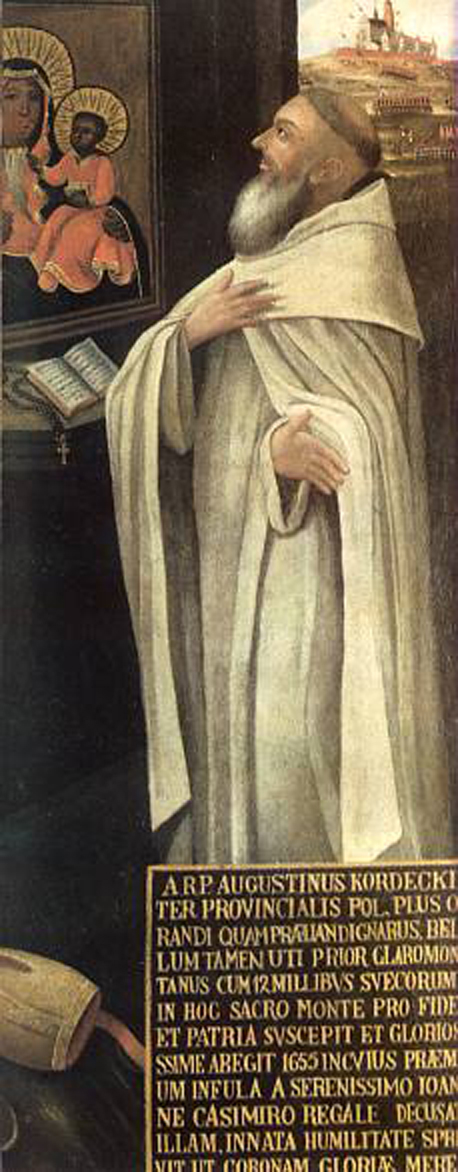
Augustyn Kordecki

Abbot Augustyn Kordecki (born Klemens Kordecki Ślepowron coat of arms; November 16, 1603 – March 20, 1673) was a prior of the Jasna Góra Monastery, Poland.

He was curate and provincial of the monastery. In 1655 during the Deluge he led the defence of the monastery against the Swedish troops.

== Life ==
Klemens Kordecki came from the Gniezno diocese. He was born to a bourgeois, large family of Marcin and Dorota (he had an older sister Katarzyna and a younger brother Tomasz). His father in the years 1615-1616 was the mayor. On November 16, 1603, he was baptized in the parish church of St. Catherine in Iwanowice, and the godparents were Maciej, son of the mayor, and Elżbieta Olbińska. At ul. Garbarska 14, in Iwanowice, there is an old wooden hut from the 18th century, which according to tradition is considered to be his birthplace.

Young Clement began his education in 1615 at the local parish school, which he graduated with a very good result, so his parents decided to educate him further. He was a pupil of the Junior High School of St. Mary Magdalene. In the years 1624–1628 he studied philosophy at the Jesuit college in Kalisz, and in 1628–1633 theology at the Jesuit college in Poznań.

The choice of the monastic life path could have been influenced by the Pauline monks they met during their studies. He entered the Pauline Order at the age of 30 and on March 19, 1633, he took the habit from the Provincial Superior, Father Bartłomiej Bolesławski, OSPPE, taking the religious name Augustyn and undergoing the novitiate under the direction of Father Adam Preacher OSPPE at Jasna Góra. Due to the epidemic in the fall of 1633, he left Jasna Góra, staying in the monastery farm in Konopiska. The novice master, Father Adam Kaznowiusz OSPPE, fell victim to the epidemic then. Father Tomasz Bieniaszewicz OSPPE was appointed in his place. After completing the novitiate, he was sent toWieluń, where he taught rhetoric to young people. He made his profession on March 25, 1634, in Jasna Góra on the hands of the provincial, Father Bartłomiej Bolesławski, OSPPE. The next day after making his profession, he received the first tonsure and four minor orders, and on April 1, 1634, he was ordained subdeaconate. Two weeks later, on Holy Saturday, April 15, 1634, he was deaconated in Gniezno, and on June 10, 1634, he was ordained a priest by the Primate, Archbishop. Jan Wężyk. His reading was then such works as: Treatise on God's love to St. Francis de Sales or the Sermons of St. Albert the Great.

Initially, he was entrusted with educational work, then from mid-December 1635 he was a lecturer at Jasna Góra, and in 1636 he was appointed deputy novice master in forming future Pauline monks. He was entrusted with this function again in October 1642. On October 15 of that year, he performed at Jasna Góra as ( Latin lector conferentiarum ), that is, lecturer of moral theology. He performed these duties again in Beszowa after March 2, 1645.

In July 1638 he appeared as a companion of a Jasna Góra discrete, i.e. a representative of the convent for the provincial chapter, at which he was elected prior of Wieluń. There are traces of his work in this monastery, which are indicated in the book of rents for the years 1638, 1639 and 1640. At the congress of priors and discretes, convened on February 15, 1640, by the then General Father Mikołaj Staszewski, OSPPE, to Jasna Góra, he was elected a representative of the Polish province in Rome for the revision of the monastic constitutions. However, this decision was soon withdrawn.

Then, in June 1641, he was the prior of the monastery in Wielgomłyny, where he stayed until December 27, and then returned to Jasna Góra. In October 1642, he appeared as a discrete of the Jasna Góra convent at the provincial chapter. On July 11, 1643, he was entrusted with the function of prior in Wieluń, as a result of the resignation of Father Tomasz Bieniaszewicz, OSPPE. In June 1644, at the provincial chapter, he was elected the second definitor of the province, as well as the prior of Jasna Góra. A few months later, on March 2, 1645, he resigned from this position and left for Beszowa to perform the duties of the sub-prince of the local monastery. In connection with the opening of the novice house at the church of St. Barbara near Jasna Góra on October 1, 1646, he took the vacant office of prior in Oporów, who was entrusted to him by Father Mikołaj Staszewski, OSPPE. At the provincial chapter on August 25, 1647, he was elected the fourth provincial definitor and prior of the monastery in Pińczów, where during his tenure, the construction of new organs in the local church of St. John. There are also information about his wedding and two baptisms. Then on May 10, 1650, he was elected the first definitor of the province, by its discrete to the general chapter, as well as the prior of Jasna Góra. On May 26, 1650, he left for the Hungarian province. As a result of subsequent elections at provincial chapters in July 1653, he became the third provincial definitor and prior of Jasna Góra until February 18, 1657, and from May 1, 1660, the Polish provincial. At the general chapter of Hungary in Máriavölgy, in May 1663, he received, in the fourth decisive vote, half of the votes for the office of general of the order, Fr. Pavel Ivanovich, OSPPE, as senior profession. Father Kordecki was elected vicar general, but he did not accept the election. At the following provincial chapters he was elected: on July 4, 1663, prior of Jasna Góra, on August 3, 1666, vicar of the province and prior of Jasna Góra, on August 12, 1669, prior of Jasna Góra, and on April 7, 1671, provincial of Poland.

During the times of Kordecki, music life flourished at Jasna Góra, a vocal-instrumental band composed of monks and lay people was active there. On June 22, 1670, on behalf of the monastery, he signed a document regulating the relations between the congregation and secular musicians. On the part of the musicians, the document was signed by the then conductor of the ensemble ( Latin: Magister Capellae ), Father Władysław Leszczyński, OSPPE.

In total, he performed the duties of prior in Wieluń twice, and was also prior in Wielgomłyny, Oporów and Pińczów. He was elected prior of Jasna Góra six times. He was the provincial of the Polish province three times. In addition, he ran for the office of general of the order. He was also elected vicar general and four times the definitor of the province

Father Augustyn Kordecki died, being the provincial during a visit to the monastery in Wieruszów, after fainting in the presence of praying confreres on March 20, 1673, around 4:00 pm. Funeral ceremonies took place the next day. The procession was led by three Paulines with the Prior of Wieruszów, and also the vicar of the province, Father Konstanty Jaroszewski, OSPPE. Body, buried after being transported to Jasna Góra Monastery on March 24, next to the body of Father Grzegorz Terecki, OSPPE, under the altar of St. Antoni the Abbot in the Chapel of St. Paul the First Hermit. In 1704 his remains were moved to the crypt under the Miraculous Picture chapeland placed in a separate urn in the most honorable place: under the altar of Our Lady and marked with the name of Kordecki. Currently, the urn with ashes is located in the second part of the Chapel of Our Lady, in the side wall, behind the glass. He was an exemplary monk, diligent, skillful and preventative in administration. Courageous and humble, and having a special honor and devotion to the Mother of God. It can be added that the monstrance with which he was to lead the procession during the battles with the Swedes is sometimes used only during the most important holidays.

=== The Swedish Deluge ===
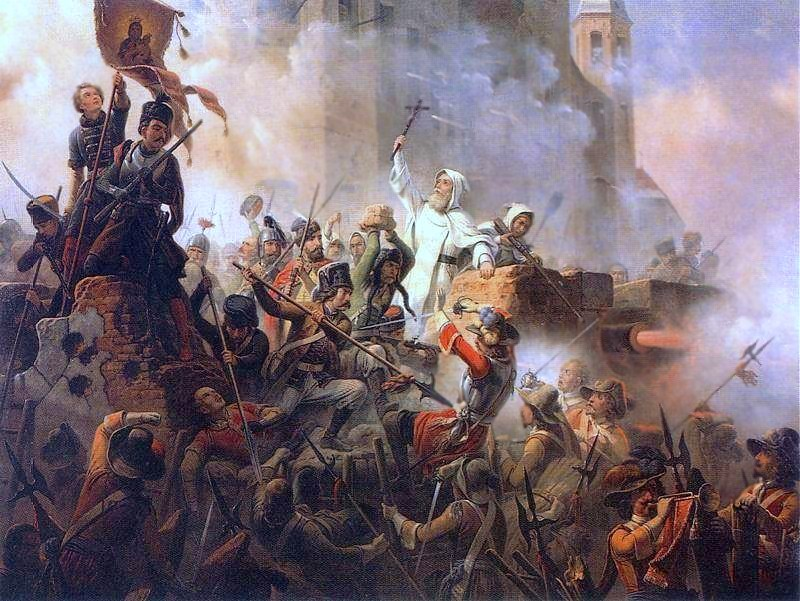
Stubborn defence of Jasna Góra on the ramparts (painted by January Suchodolski)

During the Swedish Deluge in 1655, his goal was to protect Jasna Góra from robbery and devastation by the Swedish army. For this purpose, he hid the painting of Our Lady of Częstochowa and placed a copy of it in the chapel. He sent a letter to King Charles X Gustav - now stored in the Stockholm archives, in which he agreed to surrender the fortress in exchange for a guarantee of the sanctuary's integrity. When he did not receive it, he decided to defend Jasna Góra with arms. He commanded the defense of the Jasna Góra fortress throughout the siege: from November 18 to December 27, 1655.

In the opinion of prof. Idzi Panic, Fr Augustine acted in a thoughtful manner and turned out to be an effective defender, and the letter to the Swedish king was intended to delay the attack.

== Mementoes ==
The most valuable mementoes left by father Augustyn Kordecki include:

- The Golden Monstrance, the so-called Kordecki from 1672 by the artist Wacław Grottke, which was his votive offering to the Mother of God for the victory over the Swedes (Jasna Góra collection);
- Manuscript - diary, written in Latin from 1655 (collection of the Jasna Góra library);
- The work "Nowa Gigantomachia" (Latin Nova Gigantomachia ) from 1658 (collection of the Jasna Góra library);
- Amber rosary with a medallion, with 14 secrets (Jasna Góra collection);
- Letter to general Burchard Müller von der Lühnen of November 21, 1655 (Archives of the Swedish Kingdom in Stockholm ( Swedish. Riksarkivet )).

In his diary of the siege of Częstochowa - Nowa Gigantomachia, he wrote, among others:

We urgently need to bear this in mind that we have undertaken to defend the Church of God and the good of the whole dear Motherland. (...) We remain silent about the most beautiful and, at the same time, necessary duty to stand by God and to give our lives willingly for Him. So, even if we know that the enemy will overwhelm our strength, as long as the opportunity permits and the spirit remains in the body, it will always be a glorious and salutary thing to fight boldly for God.

== Commemoration in culture and art ==
Much attention in literature and art was devoted to Father Augustyn Kordecki. In 1855 the writer Józef Ignacy Kraszewski wrote the historical novel Kordecki. The character of the heroic father is also shown in the trilogy of Henryk Sienkiewicz, in one of its parts entitled The Flood. Elżbieta Bośniacka wrote a drama in 1872 entitled The Pauline Prior. A similar drama was also written by Maria Gerson-Dąbrowska, entitled Defense of Częstochowa. Many poets devoted their poems to him, including: Cyprian Kamil Norwid, Teofil Lenartowicz, Wincenty Pol, Jan Kasprowicz and Stanisław Wyspiański. In 2004 Czesław Ryszka published a book entitled Prior of Kordecki.

Ludwik Kondratowicz in 1858 in the song Fri. The pilgrim's impression is so about him, among others he wrote :

Who awakens Kordecki's arm to power,
What did twelve thousand rebuke into three hundred?
You, Lady from Jasna Góra! - It is your effort,
What do you have at your beck and call, (...)
Above the towers in the clouds - do you see him? -
An old priest in a snow-covered habit is rising.
You can tell from the gray beard and the lofty head
that Kordecki's soul guards Częstochowa.

Adam Mickiewicz spoke about Fr. Kordecki at lectures in Paris, including:

Poland did not produce an active genius of such power as that monk's passive genius. It rises to the height from which it penetrates into the future (...). Kordecki is one of those people whom Providence sends from time to time as models for future generations. The Polish idea has never found its full embodiment as in it.

Besides, his character is shown in many pictures, the most important of which are:

- January Suchodolski : Defense of Jasna Góra (1845)
- Władysław Łuszczkiewicz : Defense of Częstochowa by priest Kordecki (1848)
- Leon Kapliński : Defense of Częstochowa (1855)
- Leszek Piasecki: The Pauline Fathers and the Jasna Góra garrison defend the Jasna Góra fortress during the Swedish Deluge (1955)

In the second half of the nineteenth century and in the first years of the twentieth century, they painted the figure of Father Kordecki: Jan Matejko : Father Kordecki on the walls of Częstochowa, Cyprian Kamil Norwid: (drawing Kordecki on Wałach Częstochowa ), and also Michał Elwiro Andriolli, Walery Eliasz-Radzikowski, Henryk Siemiradzki, Włodzimierz Tetmajer, Henryk Rodakowski, Piotr Stachiewicz and Kazimierz Alchimowicz.

In 1934, a film was made. Prior of Kordecki: defender of Częstochowa, directed by Edward Puchalski, starring Karol Adwentowicz. Częstochowa, Jasna Góra, a monument to Father Augustyn Kordecki Monuments were also erected in his honor. The most magnificent one from 1859 is on Jasna Góra by Henryk Stattler. The sculpture of Father Kordecki, Teofila Certowiczówna, is in Krakow on Skałka. Bas-relief pt. Kordecki accepts parliamentarians made Theophilus Lenartowicz, poet and sculptor. Wacław Przybylski, in turn, made a bas-relief entitled Kordecki, warming up for battle.

On the occasion of his 300th birthday, a commemorative plaque was founded in Iwanowice, in the church where he was baptized. In Szczytniki, on the road leading to Kalisz, a stone monument was founded, consecrated on October 30, 1938, by Cardinal August Hlond, in the presence of Marshal Edward Rydz-Śmigły and Bishop. Field Joseph Gawlina. During the occupation, the Germans destroyed this stone monument, leaving only a granite fence. Thanks to Fr Konstancjusz KunzOSPPE, prior of Jasna Góra, was built - in cooperation with the parish priest of Iwanowice, Fr. Jan Kaliszewski - designed by prof. Leon Machowski - a new monument to commemorate the 600th anniversary of Jasna Góra on the site of the former. It was solemnly consecrated by Card. Józef Glemp on September 19, 1982. On May 6, 1973, Card. Karol Wojtyła blessed a special plaque in Wieruszów in his honor.

== Works ==
- Nova Gigantomachia... (1658)
- Pamiętnik oblężenia Częstochowy roku 1655 (the same work in Polish, 1858)
