= Ogrodzieniec =

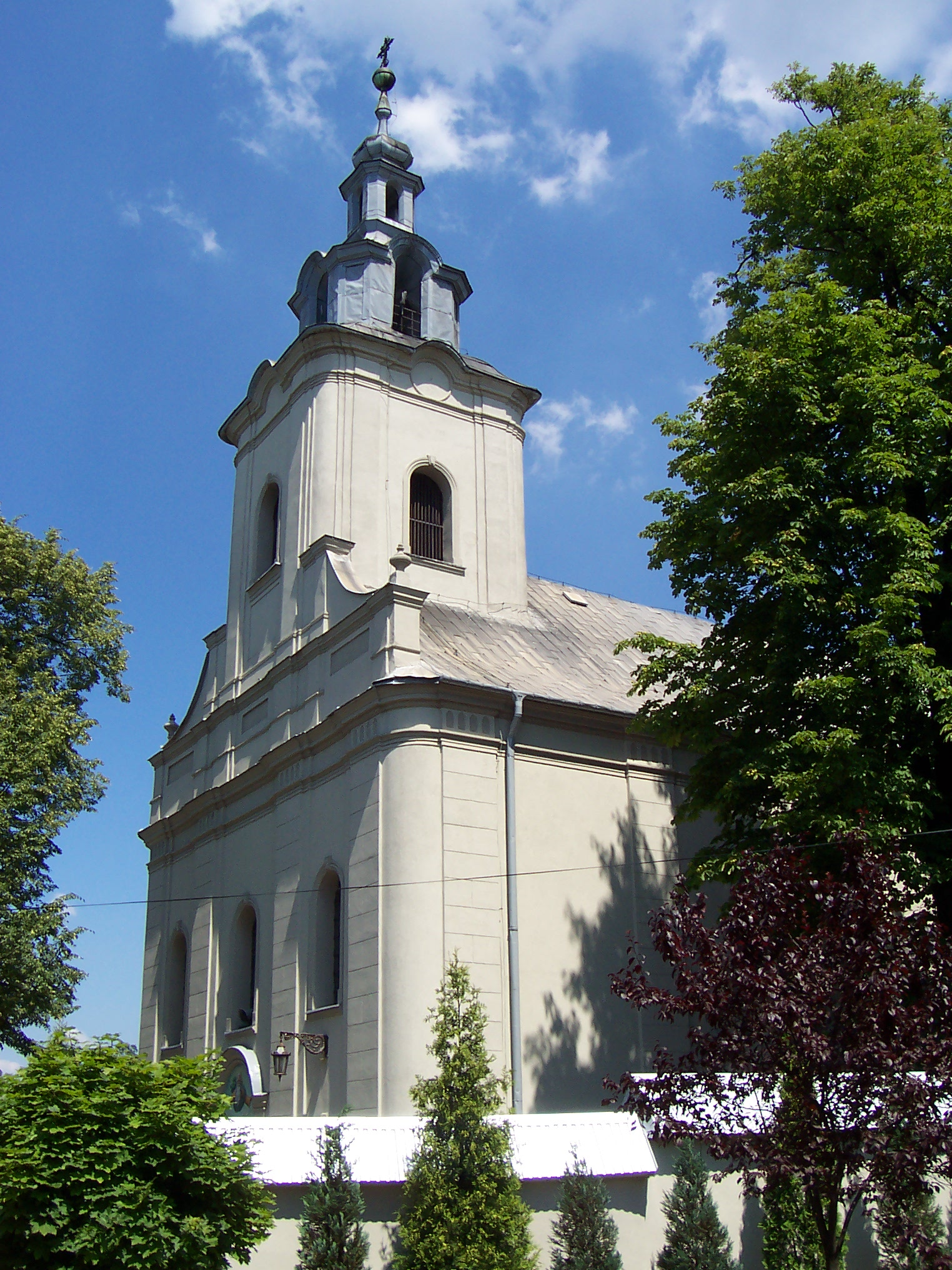
- Church of the Transfiguration of Jesus in Ogrodzieniec

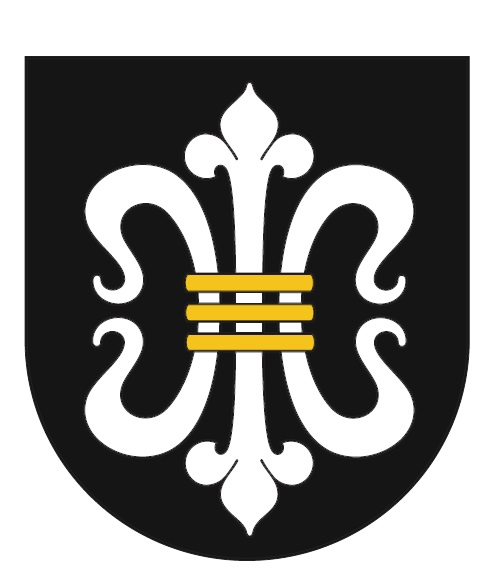
- Coat of arms

- Location within Poland
- Coordinates: 50°27′N 19°31′E
- Country: Poland
- Voivodeship: Silesian
- County: Zawiercie
- Gmina: Ogrodzieniec

Government
  - Mayor: Anna Pilarczyk

Area
  - Total: 28.94 km^{2} (11.17 sq mi)
- Elevation: 370 m (1,210 ft)

Population (2019-06-30)
  - Total: 4,282
  - Density: 148.0/km^{2} (383.2/sq mi)
- Time zone: UTC+1 (CET)
  - Summer (DST): UTC+2 (CEST)
- Postal code: 42-440
- Vehicle registration: SZA
- Website: http://www.ogrodzieniec.pl

Ogrodzieniec [ɔɡrɔˈd͡ʑɛɲɛt͡s] is a town in Zawiercie County, Silesian Voivodeship, Poland, with 4,282 inhabitants (2019). It is noted for the extensive ruins of a medieval castle.

Ogrodzieniec is a part of Lesser Poland. Ogrodzieniec lies among the hills of Lesser Poland Upland, on the outskirts of Zagłębie Dąbrowskie. The town has an area of 28 km^{2} (11 sq mi), and is located approximately 400 meters above sea level. In the south and west, Ogrodzieniec is surrounded by forests.

== History ==
The origins of the town date back to the 11th century. It was a forest settlement, with a wooden castle built along the border of Lesser Poland and Silesia. In 1241, during the first Mongol invasion of Poland, the village and the castle were burned, and afterwards, a new, stone castle was built. Ogrodzieniec received its Magdeburg rights town charter in 1386. It was a local trade center, with merchants and artisans, many of them Jewish. Furthermore, enormous forests attracted noble hunters, including Polish kings. In 1346, Ogrodzieniec Roman Catholic parish church was first mentioned. In the mid-16th century, it was turned into a Calvinist prayer house, and remained so until circa 1630, when it was returned to the Catholics. In the first half of the 18th century, a new, stone church was built, but it was not completed until 1787. Ogrodzieniec was a private town of Polish nobility, including the Pilecki, Firlej, Warszycki and Jakliński families, and was administratively located in the Lelów County in the Kraków Voivodeship in the Lesser Poland Province of the Polish Crown.

After the Third Partition of Poland, in 1795, it was annexed by the Kingdom of Prussia, and included within the newly formed province of New Silesia. In 1807 it was regained by Poles and included within the short-lived Polish Duchy of Warsaw. After its dissolution, since 1815, it belonged to Russian-controlled Congress Poland. After the unsuccessful Polish January Uprising, Ogrodzieniec, like many other locations of Lesser Poland, lost its town charter (1870). In 1888, Ogrodzieniec had 162 houses (most of them wooden), with app. 1,000 inhabitants. After World War I, in 1918, Poland regained independence and control of Ogrodzieniec. In the Second Polish Republic, Ogrodzieniec belonged to the Kielce Voivodeship.

In September 1939, during the German invasion of Poland, which started World War II, German troops massacred a group of Polish boy scouts from Ogrodzieniec in Tucznawa, and also carried out executions of Poles in Ogrodzieniec (see Nazi crimes against the Polish nation). The town was afterwards occupied by Germany and annexed directly into the Third Reich until 1945. German occupiers planned to change its name into Bonerburg.

After the war, until 1956, Ogrodzieniec belonged to Olkusz County of Kraków Voivodeship, then it was moved to Zawiercie County. Town rights were restored in 1973.

== Ogrodzieniec Castle ==
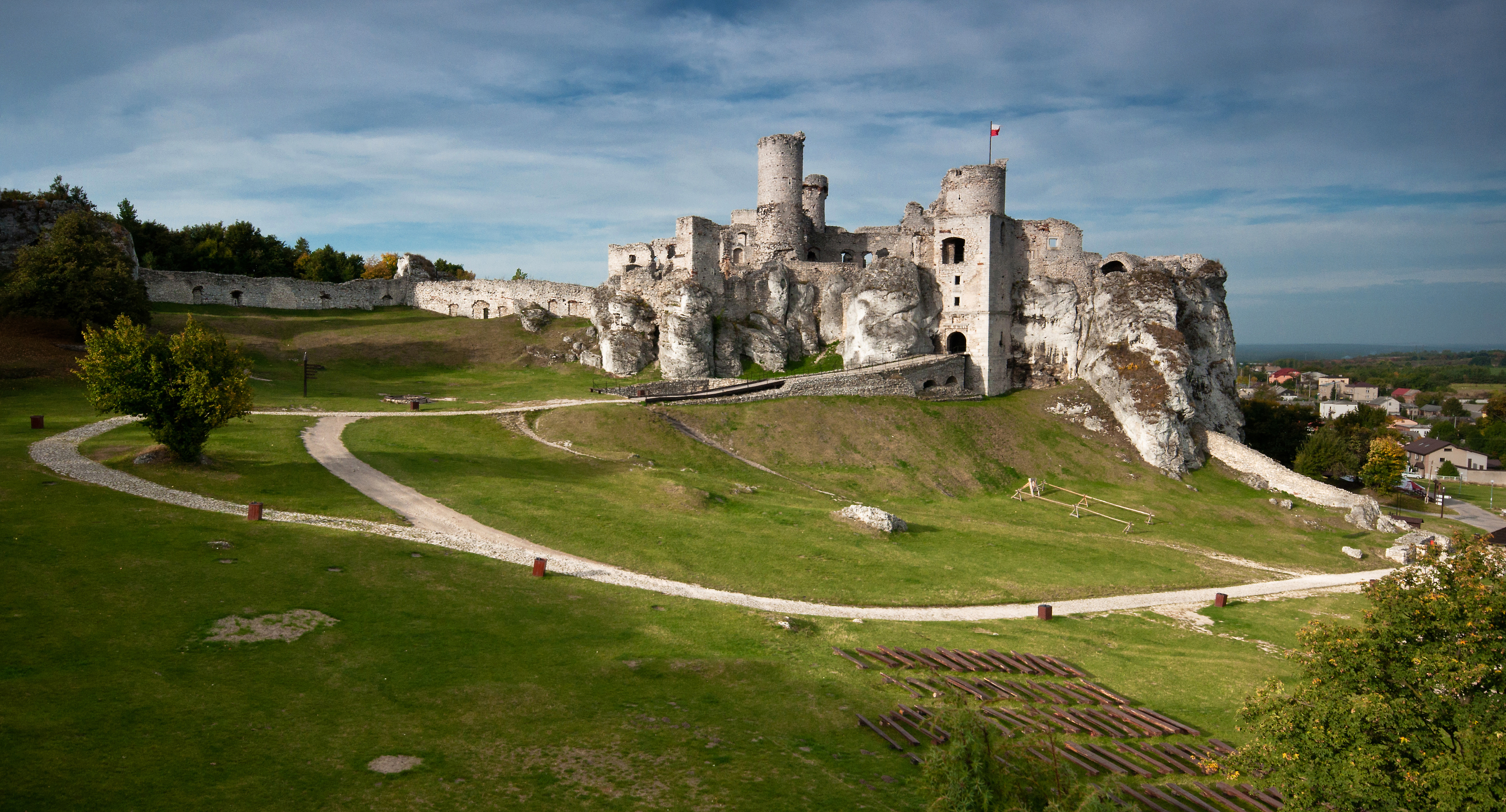
The castle ruins at Ogrodzieniec

Due to the existence of the Ogrodzieniec Castle, the town is a popular tourist center, located on the Trail of the Eagles' Nests (note: the castle itself does not administratively belong to the town, it lies in the village of Podzamcze, 2 kilometers east of Ogrodzieniec). The castle was built in the 14th century by the Sulimczyk family. It is located on Góra Zamkowa, the highest hill of the Polish Jura (515 meters above sea level).

First stronghold was built here in the early 12th century, during the reign of Bolesław III Wrymouth. In 1241, during the Mongol invasion of Poland, it was burned and destroyed, and in the mid-14th century, new, stone complex of a mighty Gothic castle was built here. The castle guarded western border of Lesser Poland, and in 1470 it was purchased by the Salomon family, merchants from Kraków. It then changed hands several times, belonging to the Rzeszowskis, Pileckis, Chełmińskis and finally, the Boner family (since 1523). In 1530 - 1545, Seweryn Boner turned the Gothic stronghold into a Renaissance residence. In 1562, Boner's daughter Zofia married Jan Firlej, and the castle, as a dowry, changed hands once more. In 1587, it was captured by Maximilian III, during the War of the Polish Succession. In 1655, it was seized by Swedes (see Deluge). Swedish garrison stayed at the castle for two years, which resulted in its extensive damage. In 1669, the castle was partially restored by its new owner, castellan of Kraków Stanisław Warszycki. In 1695 it was purchased by the Męciński family, and in 1702, once again it was destroyed by Swedish soldiers, during the Great Northern War. After the destruction, the castle remained a ruin, and its subsequent owners could not afford to rebuild the complex. It remained inhabited until circa 1810.

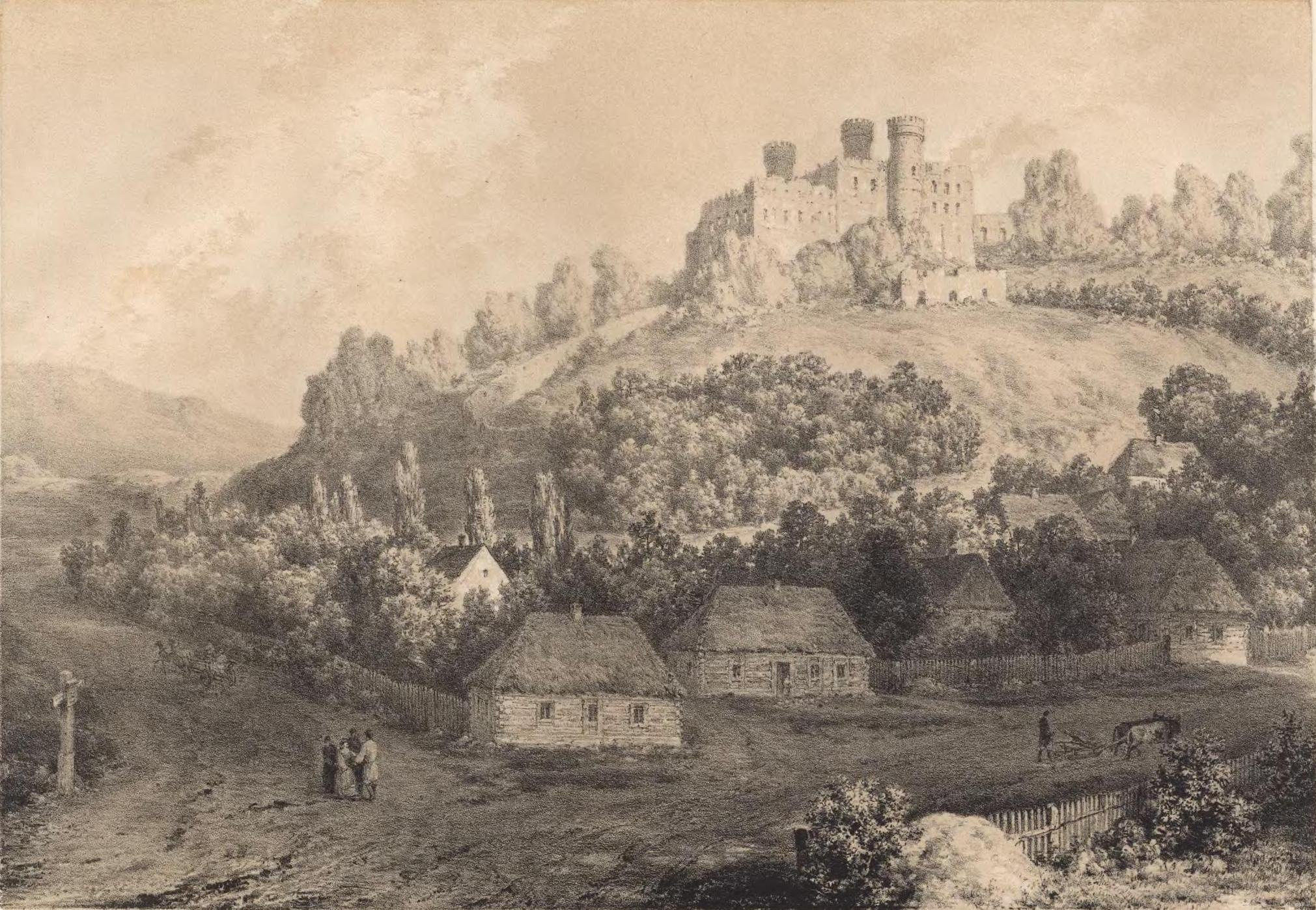
Ogrodzieniec Castle (19th century, Napoleon Orda)

After World War II, the castle was nationalized, and its walls were strengthened in 1949 - 1973, which prevented total collapse of the complex. It now has a status of permanent ruin, and is open to visitors. The castle is popular among film makers; in 1973, some episodes of the TV series Janosik were made here, and in 2001, Andrzej Wajda shot The Revenge here. Furthermore, in 1984 the castle was presented in Iron Maiden’s video Behind the Iron Curtain, in the song "Hallowed Be Thy Name". Also, in the Australia television series Spellbinder, the castle was used as the ruins of the castle of the old Spellbinders.

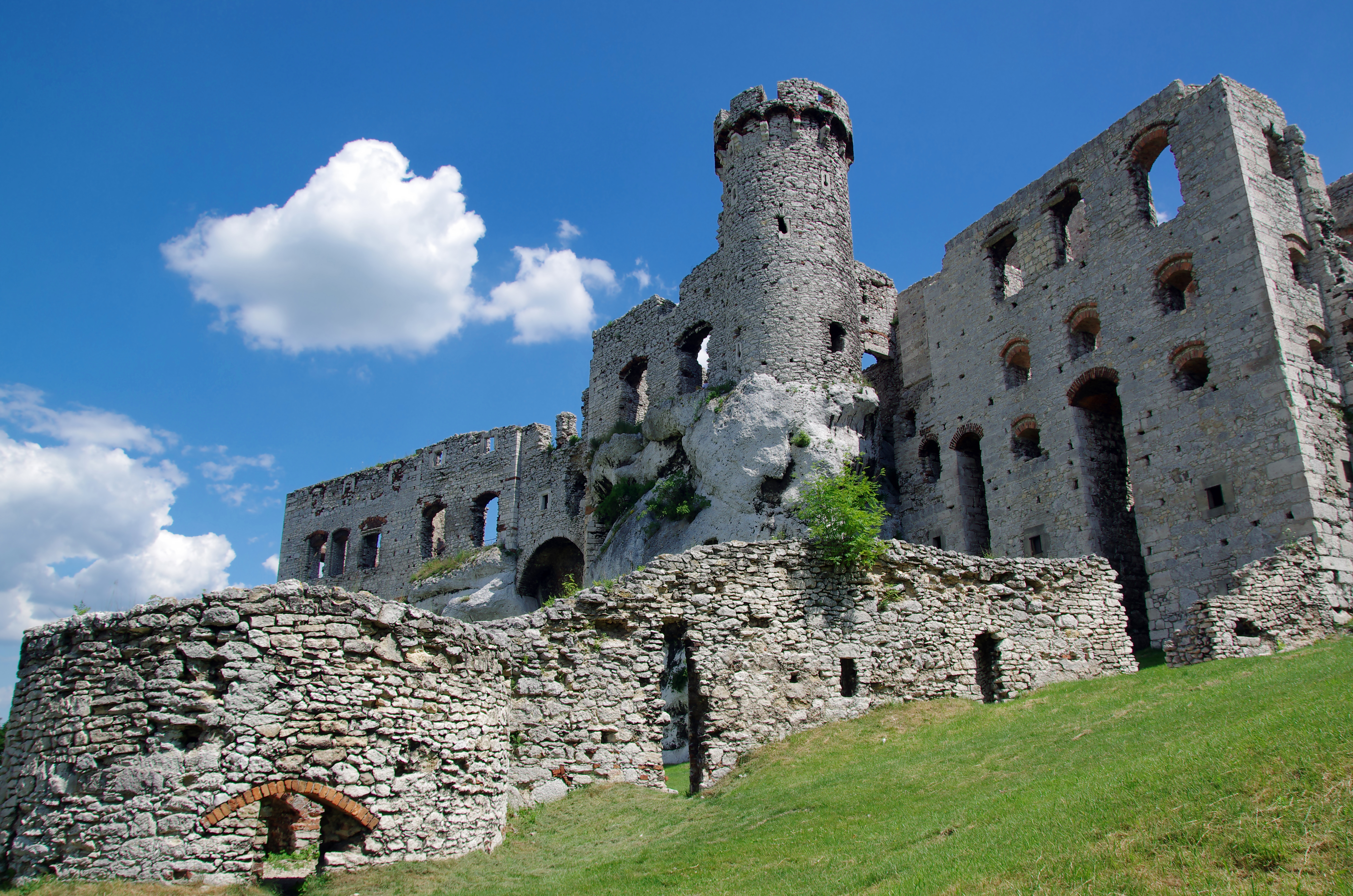
Tower of Ogrodzieniec Castle

== Twin towns – sister cities ==
See twin towns of Gmina Ogrodzieniec.

== See also ==
- Ogrodzieniec Castle
- Castles in Poland
