= Orzechowski =

Orzechowski (feminine Orzechowska, plural Orzechowscy) is a Polish surname. Notable people with the surname include:

- Artur Orzechowski, Polish diplomat
- Barbara Orzechowska-Ryszel (1931–2015), Polish fencer
- Benjamin Orzechowski (1947–2000), birth name of Benjamin Orr, American rock musician, member of The Cars
- Daniel Orzechowski (born 1985), Brazilian swimmer
- Marian Orzechowski (1931–2020), Polish politician
- Mirosław Orzechowski (born 1957), Polish politician
- Piotr Orzechowski (born 1990), Polish jazz pianist, also known as Pianohooligan
- Robert Orzechowski (born 1989), Polish handballer
- Stanisław Orzechowski (1513–1566), Ruthenian and Polish political writer and theologian
- Tom Orzechowski (born 1953), American comic book letterer
