= Danków, Silesian Voivodeship =

Danków
- Village
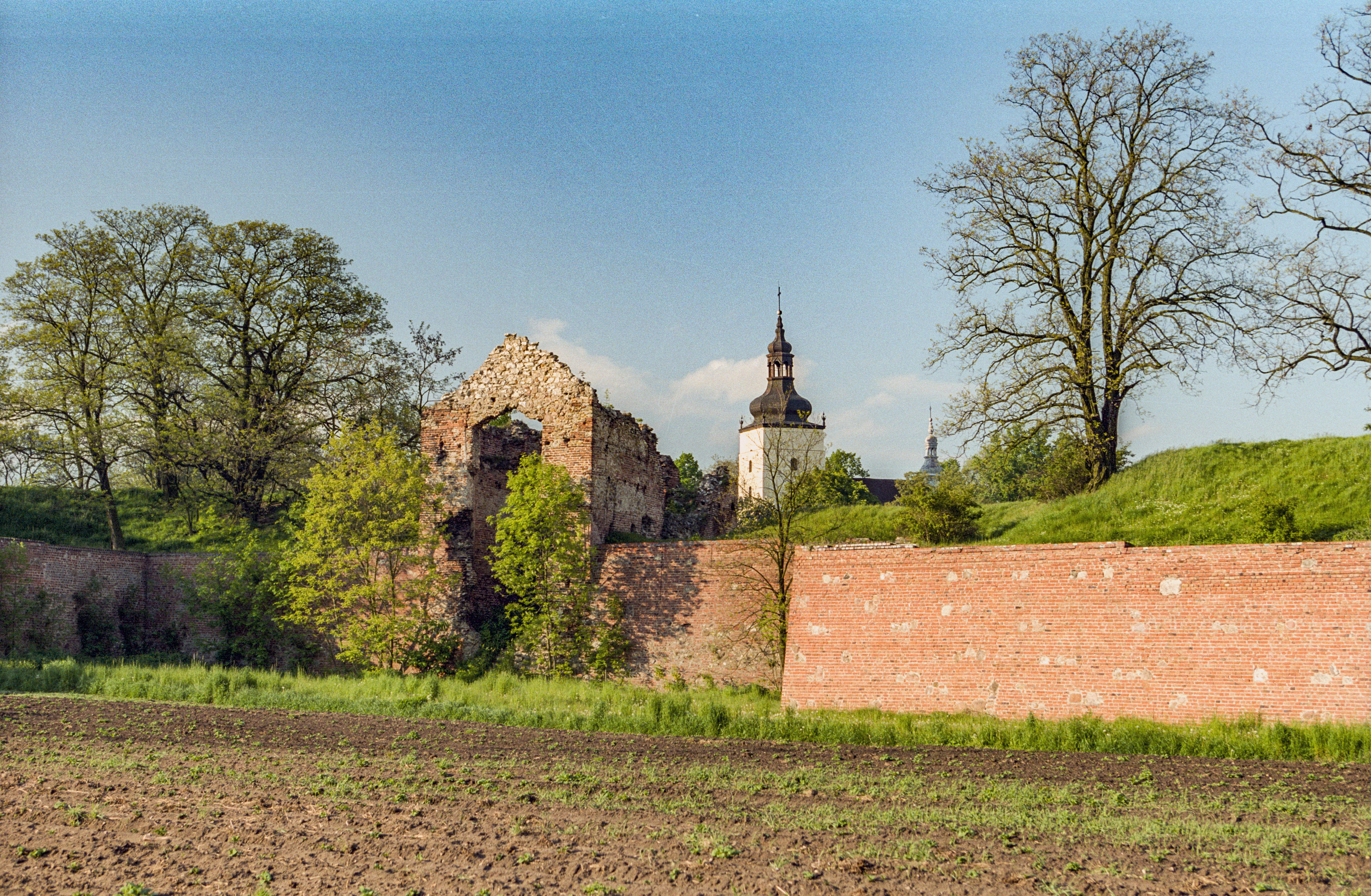
- Old fortifications

- Location within Poland
- Coordinates: 50°59′48″N 18°47′45″E
- Country: Poland
- Voivodeship: Silesian
- County: Kłobuck
- Gmina: Lipie
- Population: 532

Danków [ˈdankuf] is a village in the administrative district of Gmina Lipie, within Kłobuck County, Silesian Voivodeship, in southern Poland.

== See also ==
- Danków Castle
