= New Jewish Cemetery in Będzin =

Cemetery in Będzin, Poland

- Location within Silesian Voivodeship Location within Poland

Details
- Established: 1831
- Location: Podzamcze Street, Będzin
- Country: Poland
- Coordinates: 50.327778°N 19.131944°E
- Type: Jewish cemetery
- Size: 0.5 ha (1.2 acres)

New Jewish Cemetery in Będzin is a historic Jewish cemetery in Będzin, Poland, situated on the northern slope of Castle Hill (Góra Zamkowa) at Podzamcze Street, 200 m northeast of Będzin Castle. It was established in 1831 following a cholera epidemic.

== Heritage status ==
The cemetery, including the area of the plot on Podzamcze Street, is entered in the register of historic monuments under registration number A/1117/23, dated 16 January 2023.

The current register describes the protected site as the "new Jewish cemetery with the area of the plot, Podzamcze Street", dating it to 1831.

== History ==
Several Jewish cemeteries existed in Będzin. The cemetery on Castle Hill is the surviving cemetery generally known as the New Jewish Cemetery.

It was established following the cholera epidemic of 1831. More than 100 Jews died in Będzin within approximately two weeks during the epidemic, and additional burial space became necessary. Land for the cemetery was purchased from local inhabitants for 300 guldens, with an annual fee of 20 guldens.

Burials continued until the end of the 1870s. Rabbi Hirsch Rozanis was buried there in 1846 and an ohel was erected over his grave.

During the German occupation in World War II, the cemetery was devastated. Victims of mass executions were also buried on the site, including people murdered by the Wehrmacht in September 1939.

Inventory work was carried out in 1999–2000 and again in 2005 on behalf of the museum in Będzin. Comparison of documentation from the two stages showed continuing deterioration of the gravestones, with some being buried by soil moving down the slope and others damaged by vandalism.

== Surviving gravestones and structures ==
Approximately 250 complete gravestones and about 550 broken or heavily damaged gravestones survive at the cemetery. The oldest surviving gravestone dates from 1831. The gravestones are made mainly of sandstone and limestone and bear inscriptions in Hebrew and Yiddish. Some retain traces of painted decoration.

Several gravestones reportedly bore the Polish Eagle. These have been interpreted as marking graves of Jewish participants in the Polish national uprisings of 1831 and 1863. A fragment of the gravestone of Rabbi Jakub Natan, decorated with the Polish Eagle, was transferred to the Zagłębie Museum in Będzin.

The foundations of an ohel survive in the central part of the cemetery. Virtual Shtetl identifies it as probably having belonged to Rabbi Baruch Hercygier.

Remains of a stone boundary wall also survive. The present entrance includes a reconstructed gate.

== Present condition ==
The cemetery is no longer active. Its grounds are largely wooded, and parts of the historic cemetery boundaries are difficult to identify in the field.

Virtual Shtetl gives the historic cemetery area as approximately 1 hectare, while the Polish Wikipedia infobox and some heritage records give 0.5 hectares. The discrepancy reflects differing definitions of the surviving or protected area.
