= Mizrachi House of Prayer in Będzin =

Historical Mizrachi House of Prayer in Będzin (Silesia, Poland)

- Entrance to the Mizrachi House of Prayer

- Location in Silesian Voivodeship Mizrachi House of Prayer in Będzin (Poland)

Religion
- Affiliation: Orthodox Judaism
- Status: Museum site

Location
- Location: 3 Potockiego Street, Będzin
- Country: Poland
- Coordinates: 50.324000°N 19.133000°E

Architecture
- Type: House of prayer
- Materials: Brick

Mizrachi House of Prayer in Będzin is a former Jewish house of prayer located in a semi-basement room of a tenement building at Potockiego Street no. 3 in Będzin, Poland. It was probably established during World War I and was associated with the religious Zionist Mizrachi movement.

Since April 2012, the house of prayer has been administered as a museum site by the Museum of Zagłębie in Będzin.

== Heritage status ==
The surviving painted decoration of the men's prayer room is entered in the register of movable historic monuments under registration number B/129/08, dated 12 August 2008.

The register entry concerns the polychrome decoration in the men's prayer room rather than the entire building.

Municipal conservation documentation likewise identifies the protected object as the polychrome decoration of the Mizrachi house of prayer and gives the registration number B/129/08.

== History ==
The house of prayer was probably established during World War I on the initiative and with the financial support of the merchant Jakub Chil Winer. The tenement building in which it was located was locally known as "Little Będzin". Religious Zionist groups associated with the Mizrachi movement met there.

In 1925, the house of prayer was one of the venues used by Zionists from the Kielce and Kraków voivodeships during a regional congress. It was also used by representatives of other Jewish Zionist organisations.

The house of prayer survived World War II. After the war, the premises were adapted for other uses and were eventually used as a cellar and coal-storage room. A partition wall divided the former prayer room into two parts.

The former prayer room was rediscovered in 2004. Coal was removed, the partition wall was demolished and the surviving paintings were secured. The eastern wall retained the blocked recess formerly occupied by the Torah ark.

In 2007, the house of prayer was closed to visitors after sections of the painted decoration began detaching from the ceiling. The paintings were subsequently entered in the register of movable historic monuments in 2008.

Conservation work was carried out in 2010–2011. The restored house of prayer reopened in 2012 and became part of the Museum of Zagłębie in Będzin in April of that year.

== Interior and painted decoration ==
The house of prayer consists of a single room located partly below ground level, with an entrance from the courtyard of the tenement building at Potockiego Street no. 3.

The surviving polychrome decoration dates from approximately 1920 according to the Museum of Zagłębie and Virtual Shtetl. Municipal conservation documentation dates the decoration more broadly to approximately 1925–1930 and describes it as oil-tempera painting on plaster in a realist style with elements of Art Deco.

The paintings include representations of Absalom's Tomb, Rachel's Tomb, floral motifs and Jewish ritual objects, including a menorah, hanukkiah, spice box and Havdalah candle.

The ceiling is divided into three barrel-vaulted sections containing symbolic representations associated with the Twelve Tribes of Israel. A Star of David occupies the central part of the composition.

The wall decoration also contains signs of the zodiac, almost all of which have survived.

The eastern wall contains the former location of the Torah ark. Remains of a mikveh survive behind an adjoining wall, along with remains rainwater collection system.

The imagery of the surviving paintings includes motifs associated with Zionism and reflects the ideological orientation of the Mizrachi movement.

== Conservation ==
Municipal conservation documentation describes the room as a single semi-basement space and identifies the polychrome decoration as its principal protected historic element.

The conservation programme included consolidation of weakened plaster and detached paint layers, cleaning of the painted surfaces, treatment of moisture-related deterioration, improvements to damp-proofing and ventilation, and restoration of the surviving decoration.

The conservation work was completed in 2011, and the house of prayer reopened to visitors in 2012.

== Gallery ==
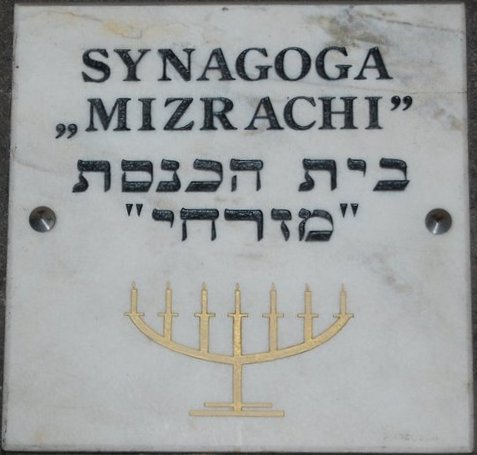
Modern time plaque above entrance

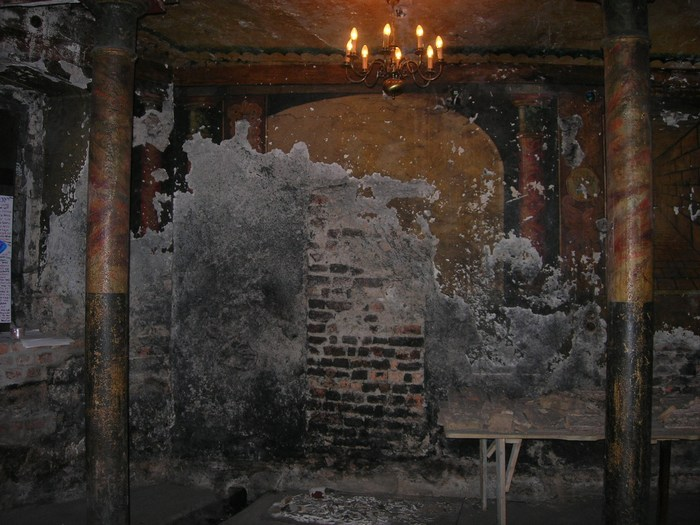
Interior before conservation

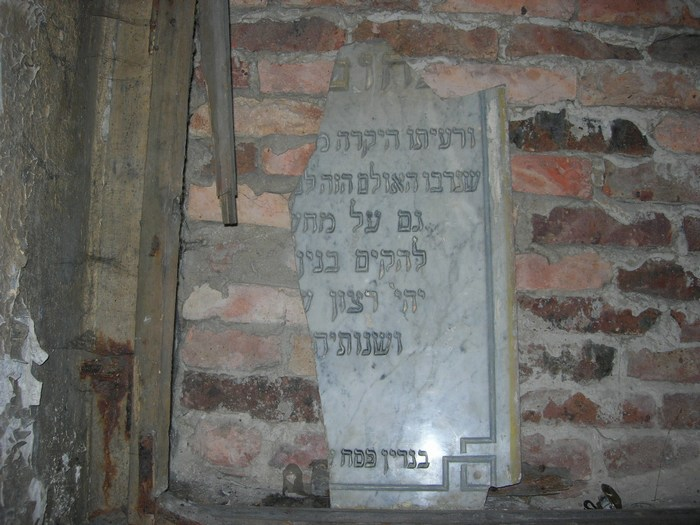
Original marble plaque

Entrance to house of prayer from backyard

Interior detail

Traces of missing mezuzah in door frame

Interior decoration
