= Richard Primus =

American legal scholar (born 1969)

Richard A. Primus
- Born: 1969 (age 56–57)
- Spouse: Eve Lynn Brensike (m. 2007)
- Relatives: Sigmund Strochlitz (maternal grandfather)
- Awards: Guggenheim Fellowship (2008)

Academic background
- Education: Harvard University (AB); Balliol College, Oxford (DPhil); Yale University (JD)

Academic work
- Discipline: Constitutional law
- Institutions: University of Michigan

Richard Abraham Primus (born 1969) is an American legal scholar. He currently teaches United States constitutional law at the University of Michigan Law School, where he is Theodore J. St. Antoine Collegiate Professor of Law. In 2008, he was awarded a Guggenheim Fellowship for his work on the relationship between history and constitutional interpretation.

== Education and career ==
Primus graduated from Harvard College with an A.B., summa cum laude, in social studies. He then earned a Doctor of Philosophy in politics at Balliol College, Oxford, where he was a Rhodes Scholar and the Jowett Senior Scholar. After studying law at Yale Law School, Primus was a law clerk to Judge Guido Calabresi on the United States Court of Appeals for the Second Circuit and for Justice Ruth Bader Ginsburg of the U.S. Supreme Court.

Primus then practiced law at the Washington, D.C. office of Jenner & Block before joining the Michigan Law School faculty in 2001. He has taught as a visiting professor at Columbia Law School, New York University School of Law, and the University of Tokyo. Primus currently teaches Introduction to Constitutional Law and Constitutional Theory at the University of Michigan.

His maternal grandfather, Sigmund Strochlitz (1916–2006), was a Holocaust survivor and confidant of Elie Wiesel. Primus has been married to Eve Brensike, who is also a professor at the University of Michigan School of Law, since 2007.

== Publications ==
- Primus, Richard A. (1999). The American Language of Rights. Cambridge University Press. doi:10.1017/cbo9780511490699. ISBN 978-0-521-65250-6.
- Primus, Richard A. (2025). The Oldest Constitutional Question: Enumeration and Federal Power. Harvard University Press, forthcoming June 3, 2025.

== See also ==
- List of law clerks for the sixth seat of the Supreme Court of the United States
