= Monika Jarosińska =

Polish actress and singer

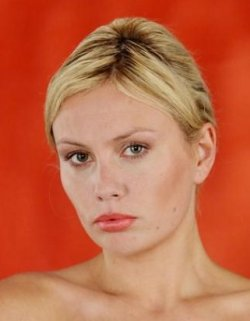
- Born: 28 May 1974 (age 52); Będzin, Katowice Voivodeship, Polish People's Republic
- Education: Łódź Film School
- Occupations: Actress, singer
- Years active: 2000-present

Monika Jarosińska (born 28 May 1974 in Będzin) is a Polish actress and singer.

She is married.

== Filmography ==
- 2001 Quo Vadis
- 2002 Day of the Wacko
- 2003: Tak czy nie?
- 2003: Show
- 2004: Park tysiąca westchnień
- 2007: Dwie strony medalu
- 2011-2012 Plebania (series)
