= Będzin =

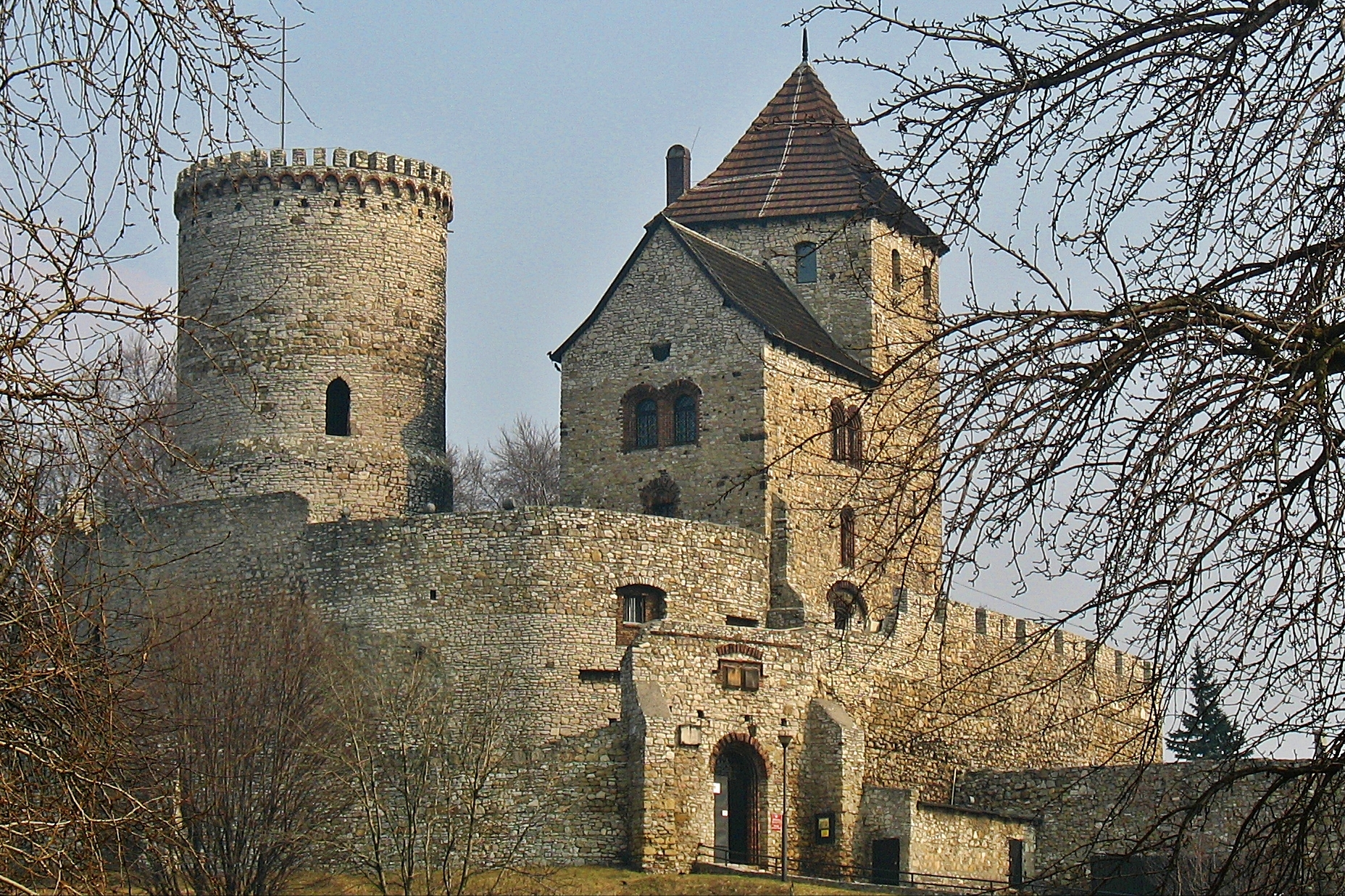
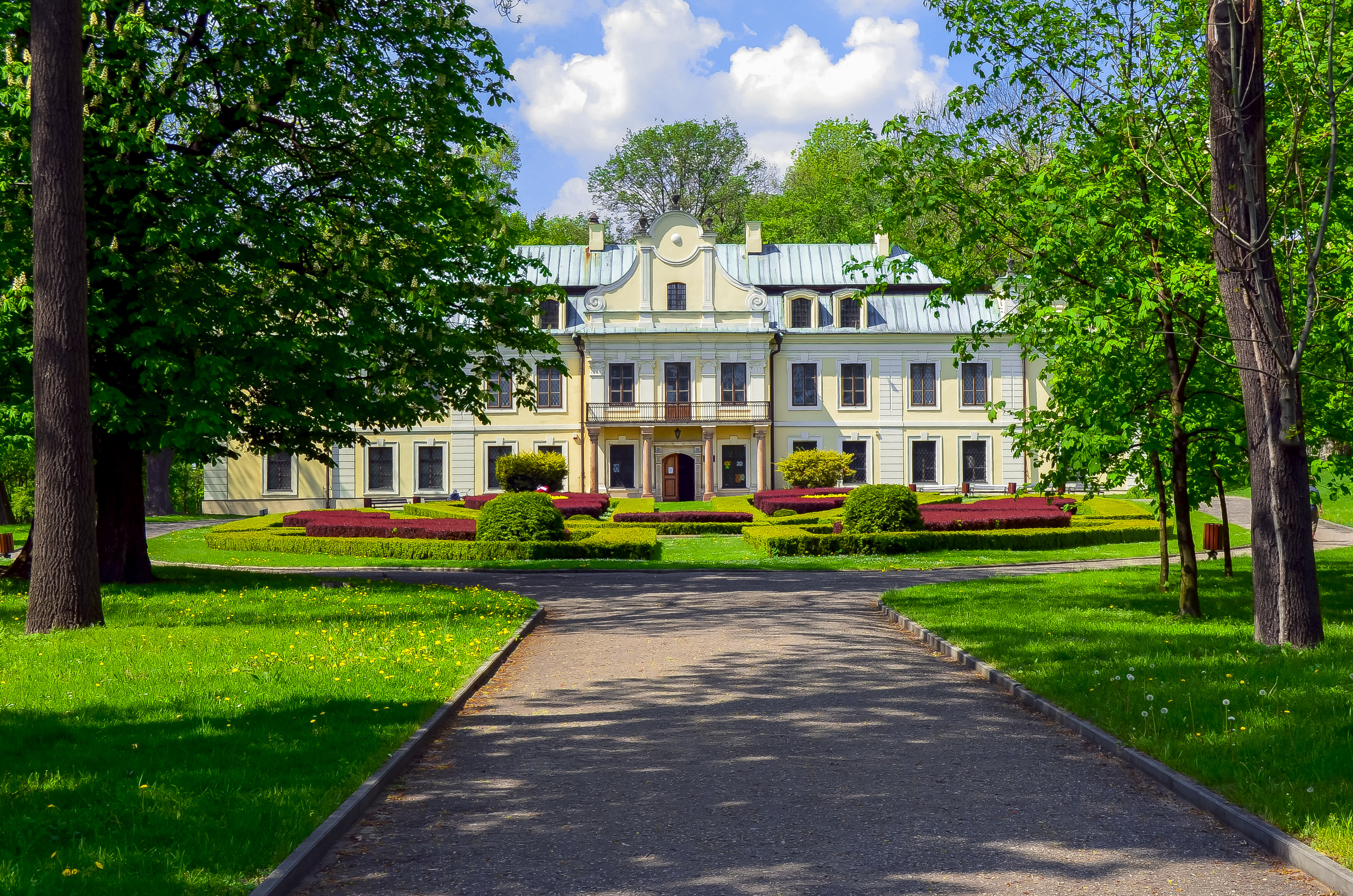
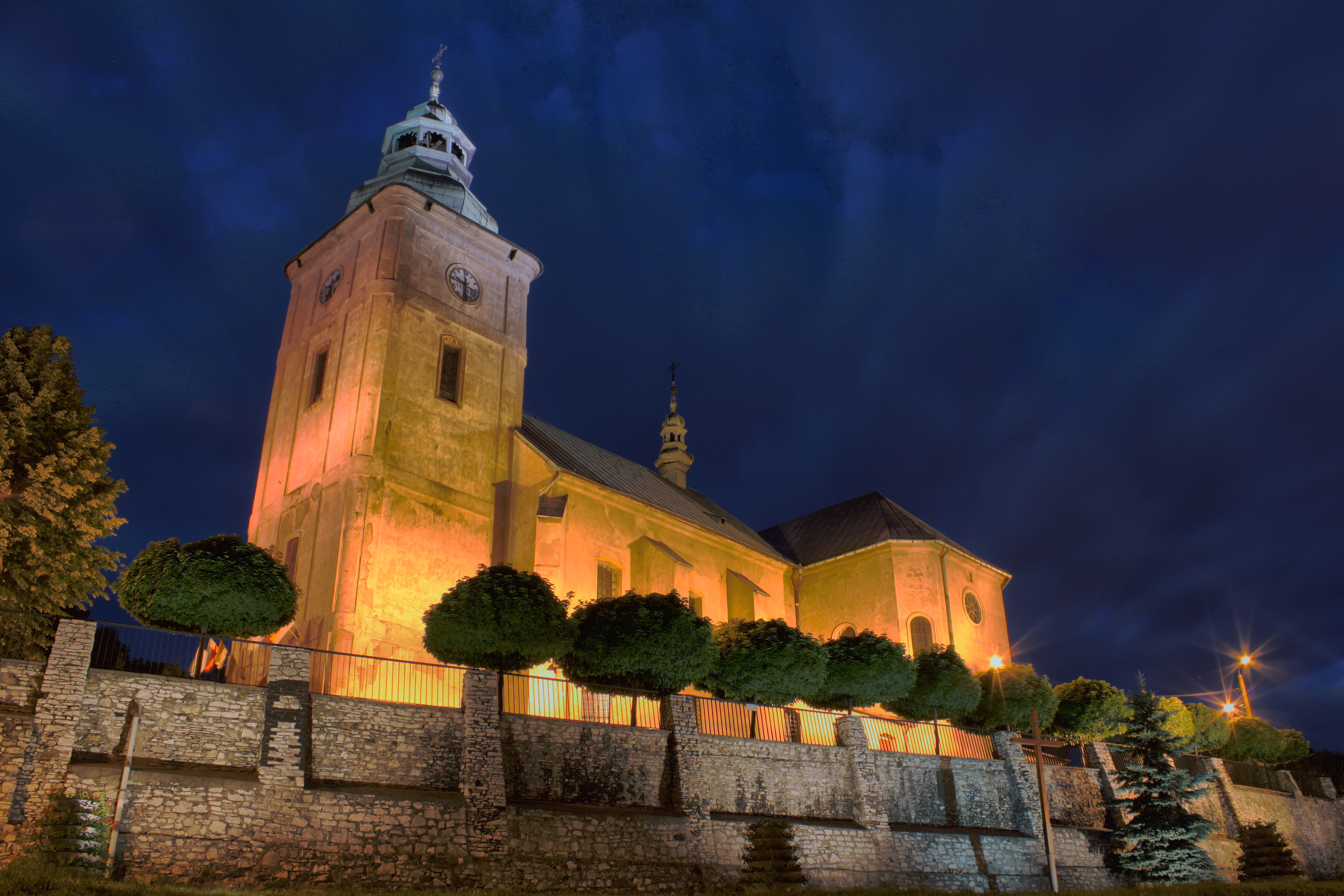
- Będzin Royal Castle Mieroszewski Palace Holy Trinity Church

- Flag Coat of arms
- Motto: Civitas Regi Bendzinensis
- Location within Poland Location within Silesian Voivodeship
- Coordinates: 50°20′N 19°7′E
- Country: Poland
- Voivodeship: Silesian
- County: Będzin
- Gmina: Będzin (urban gmina)
- Established: 9th century
- City rights: 1358

Government
  - City mayor: Łukasz Komoniewski (L)

Area
  - Total: 37.37 km^{2} (14.43 sq mi)
- Highest elevation: 382 m (1,253 ft)
- Lowest elevation: 260 m (850 ft)

Population (31 December 2021)
  - Total: 55,183
  - Density: 1,477/km^{2} (3,830/sq mi)
- Time zone: UTC+1 (CET)
  - Summer (DST): UTC+2 (CEST)
- Postal code: 42-500
- Area code: +48 32
- Primary airport: Katowice Airport
- Car plates: SBE
- Website: http://www.bedzin.pl

Będzin (Polish: [ˈbɛɲd͡ʑin]; also seen spelled Bendzin; Yiddish: בענדין, romanized: Bendin) is a city in the Dąbrowa Basin, in southern Poland. It lies in the Silesian Highlands, on the Czarna Przemsza River (a tributary of the Vistula). Even though part of Silesian Voivodeship, Będzin belongs to historic Lesser Poland, and it is one of the oldest towns of this region. Będzin is regarded as the capital of industrial Dąbrowa Basin.

It has been situated in the Silesian Voivodeship since its formation in 1999. Before 1999, it was located in the Katowice Voivodeship. Będzin is one of the cities of the 2.7 million conurbation - Katowice urban area and within a greater Katowice-Ostrava metropolitan area populated by about 5,294,000 people. The population of the city itself as of December 2021 is 55,183.

Będzin is located 12 km (7 mi) from Katowice and 4 km (2 mi) from the center of Sosnowiec. Together with Sosnowiec, Dąbrowa Górnicza, Czeladź, Wojkowice, Sławków and Siewierz it is a part of Zagłębie Dąbrowskie, a highly industrialized and densely populated part of western Lesser Poland. Będzin borders the cities of Sosnowiec, Dąbrowa Górnicza, Czeladź, Siemianowice Śląskie, and Wojkowice, as well as the village of Psary. The highest point of the town is St. Dorothy Mountain 382 m (1,253 ft) above sea level, and the area of Będzin is 37.37 km^{2} (14.43 sq mi).

== Districts ==
Będzin is divided into eight districts: Grodziec in 1951–1975 was a separate town, Gzichów is part of Będzin since 1915, Ksawera is part of Będzin since 1923, Łagisza in 1967–1973 was a separate town, Małobądz is part of Będzin since 1915, Śródmieście is the historic center, Warpie is part of Będzin since 1923.

== Etymology ==
The name Będzin most probably comes from ancient Polish given name Beda or Bedzan. In the past, the town was also called Banden, Bandin, Bandzien, Bondin, Bandzen, Bandzin, Badzin, Bendzin, and Bendsburg (1939–1945).

== History ==
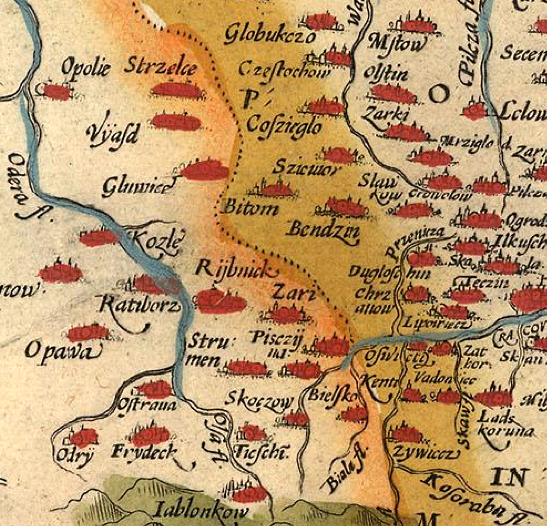
Fragment of a map from 1592 with Bendzin marked

First mention of the village of Będzin comes from 1301, but a settlement (or a grod) had existed here since the 9th century, guarding ancient trade route from Kyiv to Western Europe. In the 1340s, a town was founded here, with King Casimir III the Great building a stone strongpoint. On August 5, 1358, Będzin was incorporated as a town, and became a royal city of Poland, administratively located in the Kraków Voivodeship in the Lesser Poland Province.

In the Jagiellonian period Będzin, located on the border between Lesser Poland and Silesia, was a major trade center. In 1565 King Sigismund II Augustus allowed the town to have five markets a week, and in 1589, at Będzin Castle, Polish–Austrian negotiations took place. At that time, a Jewish community already existed here. In 1655, during The Deluge, both town and castle were destroyed by the Swedes, and Będzin did not recover from the destruction for many years. Following the Third Partition of Poland, in 1795 the town was annexed by the Kingdom of Prussia, and was included within the newly established province of New Silesia. In 1807 it was regained by Poles and included in the short-lived Duchy of Warsaw and in 1815 it became part of Russian-controlled Congress Poland.

=== Industrial revolution ===
19th-century view of the Będzin Castle

In the late 18th century rich deposits of coal were found in the area. In the 19th century, Będzin and its vicinity enjoyed a period of rapid industrialization and urbanization. New settlements and towns were founded, and the region of Zagłębie Dąbrowskie was established in southwestern corner of Congress Poland. In 1858, Będzin got its first rail connection, due to construction of the Warsaw–Vienna railway. The town increased in population and size, when town limits were expanded by including neighboring settlements. During the January Uprising, in February 1863, Będzin was captured by Polish insurgents after their victory in the Battle of Sosnowiec nearby.

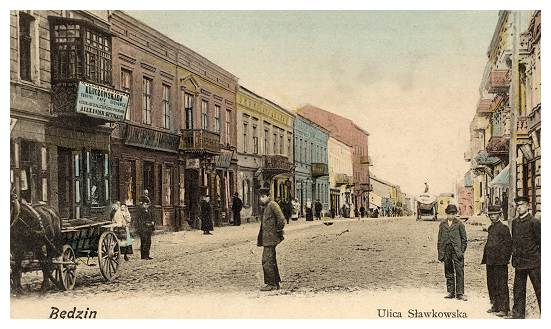
Early 20th-century view of Będzin

The Będzin Power Station was opened in 1913.

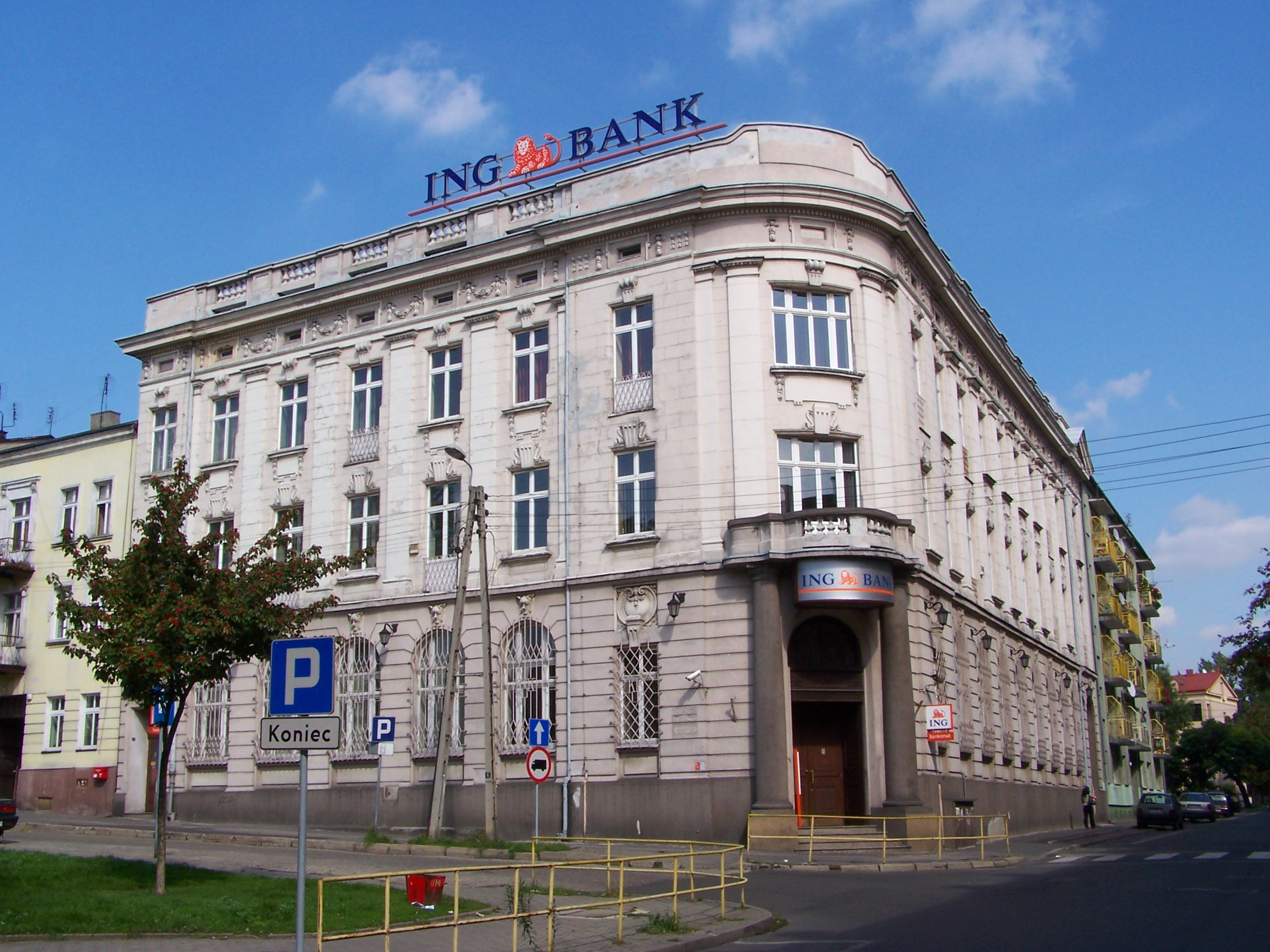
Pre-war tenement houses in Będzin

Będzin was eventually restored to Poland, when the country regained independence in 1918, after World War I. In the Second Polish Republic Będzin was an important center of local administration and industry. New rail station, waterworks, schools and offices were built.

=== World War II ===
During the German invasion of Poland, which started World War II, the Wehrmacht entered Będzin on September 4, 1939, and in the following days the Germans committed the first atrocities in the city. On September 6, the Germans murdered 20 Poles, and on September 9, they murdered 100 Jews, set fire to the synagogue and Jewish houses, and then in attempt to blame the Poles they arrested and executed 42 Poles. Local Polish parish priest Wincenty Mieczysław Zawadzki rescued a group of Jews who escaped the German massacre by opening the gates of the Holy Trinity church to them and giving them shelter. The German police carried out mass searches of Polish houses. Inhabitants of Będzin were also among Poles murdered in Celiny in June 1940. The Będzin Ghetto was established by the German occupational authority in July 1940. During the occupation, the city's name was changed to a German form, Bendsburg, and it was part of Upper Silesia Province, as the capital of Landkreis Bendsburg.

During the war the city was the base for a working party (E716) of British and Commonwealth prisoners of war, under the administration of Stalag VIII-B/344 at Łambinowice (then known as Lamsdorf). In January 1945, as the Soviet armies resumed their offensive and advanced from the east, the prisoners were marched westward in the so-called Long March or Death March. Many of them died from the bitter cold and exhaustion. The lucky ones got far enough to the west to be liberated by the allied armies after some four months of travelling on foot in appalling conditions. Here, the prisoners experienced harsh conditions, but those remain pale by comparison to those of the Jews of Będzin.

In 1943–1944, the Germans also operated a subcamp of the Auschwitz concentration camp in the present-day district of Łagisza, in which they held and brutalized from 300 to over 700 prisoners as forced labourers. In August 1943, as the Germans attempted to round up the last Jews still in Będzin, Jewish resistance fighters staged an armed revolt that lasted several days. One of the leaders was a woman, Frumka Plotnicka, who had earlier been a fighter in Warsaw in the ghetto revolt there. All the resistance fighters were killed in the action. In 2026, archeologists excavated the resistance hideout bunker, adjacent to a building known as the Ghetto Fighters’ House, located at what today is 24 Rutka Laskier Street. More than 1000 Będzin Jews survived the war, several given help by local Poles.

On January 27, 1945, the town was captured by the Red Army. Subsequently, the castle was rebuilt, now housing the Museum of Zagłębie. New districts with blocks of flats were built and new factories were opened, including the Łagisza Power Station.

=== Jewish community ===
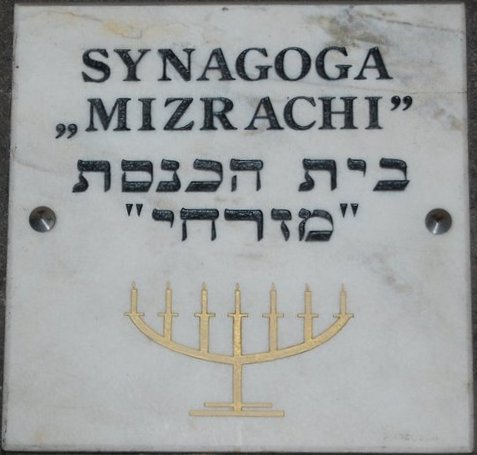
Mizrachi Synagogue

Until World War II, Będzin had a vibrant Jewish community. Bedzin was known as "Yerushalayim de Zeglembie" ("Jerusalem of Zagłębie). According to the Russian census of 1897, out of the total population of 21,200, Jews constituted 10,800 (around 51% percent). According to the Polish census of 1921 the town had a Jewish community consisting of 17,298 people, or 62.1 percent of its total population. In September 1939, the German Army (Wehrmacht) overran this area, followed by the SS death squads (Einsatzgruppen), who burned the Będzin synagogue and murdered 200 Jewish inhabitants. A Będzin Ghetto was created in 1942. Eventually, in the summer of 1943, most of the Jews in Będzin were deported to Auschwitz concentration camp. After World War II, the Mizrachi synagogue was used as a storage room by residents of the building until its discovery by a member of the city council who became interested in preserving the city's Jewish heritage. The synagogue has since been renovated and is open to visitors who register in advance. Close by is another synagogue, Brama Cukerman (Cukerman's Gate), which had been turned into a residential apartment and has also been restored.

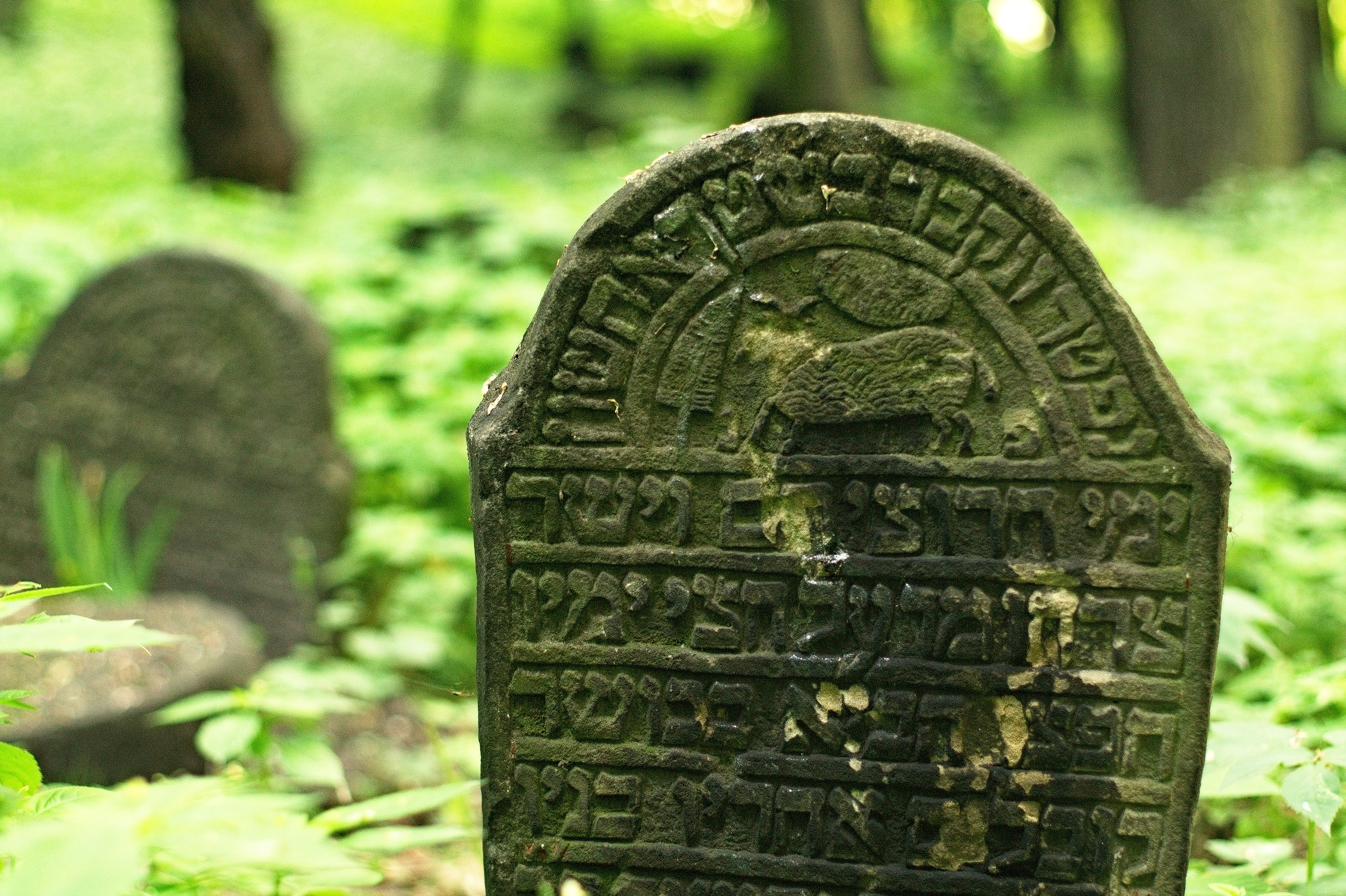
Jewish Necropolis, Bedzin

The oldest Jewish burial ground was located beyond the former city walls and dating to the 15th century. It remained in use for several centuries before being abandoned in 1831. A cholera epidemic that same year and the long-term environmental degradation, preceded the establishment of a new cemetery in the Podzamcze district, at the foot of Góra Zamkowa (The Castle Mount). Today, this later burial ground is largely overgrown with woodland, and many of its headstones have shifted or collapsed over time. Conservation work has identified approximately 850 headstones or fragments, the earliest dating from 1831.

In March 1913, the Jewish sports club Hakoach Będzin was founded by students from the local trade school, led by Yaakov Ehrlich. The club aimed to promote physical fitness and strengthen the social and cultural identity of Jewish youth, in line with the broader “Hakoah” (The strength) movement in Europe. The club was active until 1943 and the deportation of 5000 people to Auschwitz.

== Transport ==
Będzin is served by national roads 94, connecting Zgorzelec and Kraków, and 86, connecting Katowice and Warsaw.

Katowice International Airport is located about 23 km (14 mi) from the town, at Pyrzowice.

The town is also a railway junction, with three stations: Będzin Miasto, Będzin and Będzin Ksawera. Local bus and tram services connect Będzin with neighbouring towns and cities in the Upper Silesian metropolitan area. The first tram line in Będzin opened in 1928. At that time the Black Przemsza River which runs through the city was also an important transport hub.

== Sports ==
The city's most notable sports club is volleyball team MKS Będzin, which competes in Tauron I Liga (Poland's second division). Other clubs include association football teams Sarmacja Będzin and RKS Grodziec, which compete in the lower leagues, and American football team Zagłębie Steelers.

In 2019, the "Hakoach" Będzin football team was re-established on the initiative of Adam Szydłowski, as a tribute to the team that played in Będzin before the war, and many of whose players were murdered in the Holocaust. The team plays in the Polish "Retro Liga", designated for football teams once active in Poland, which have now disappeared.

Sights of Będzin (examples)

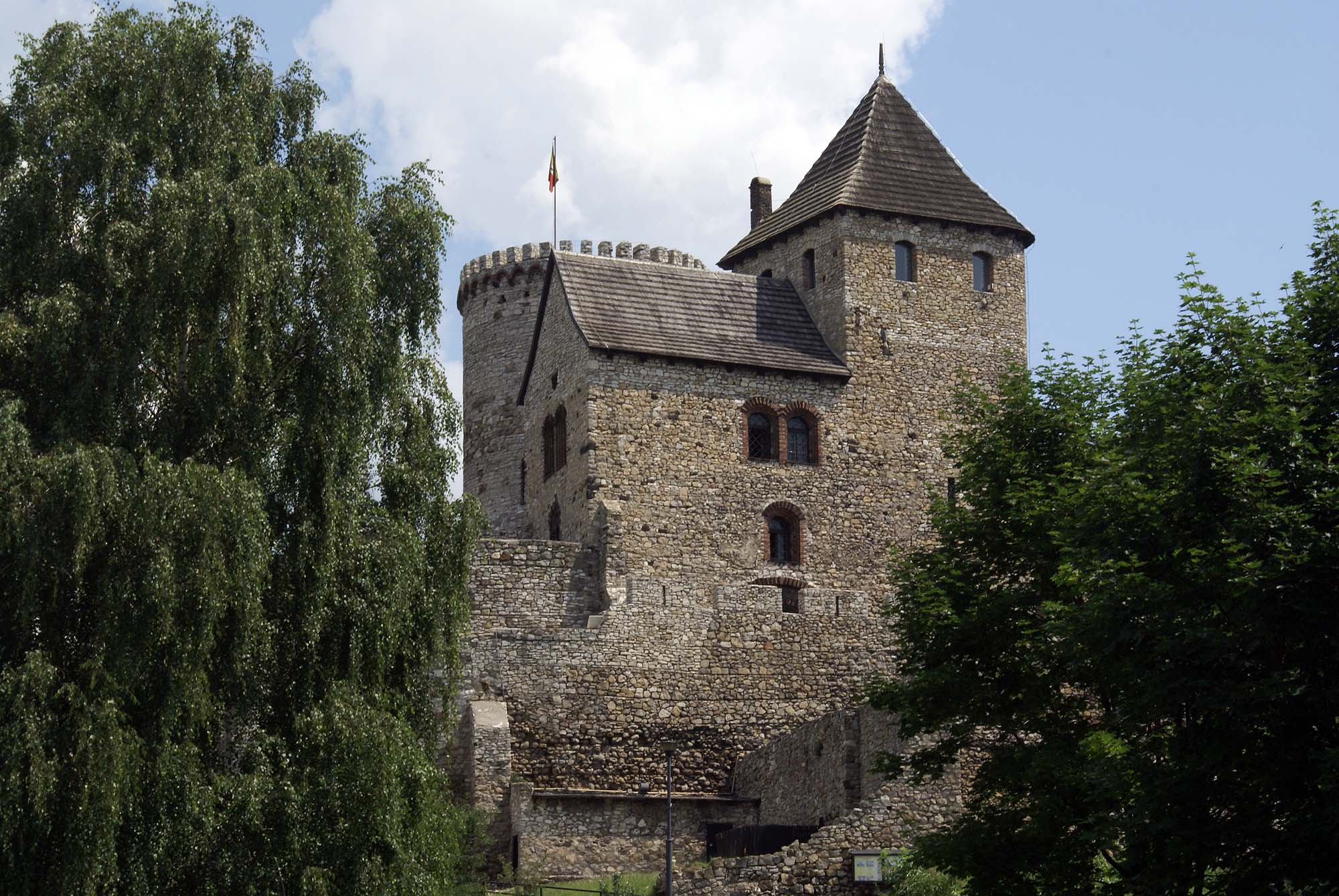
Royal Castle, now a museum

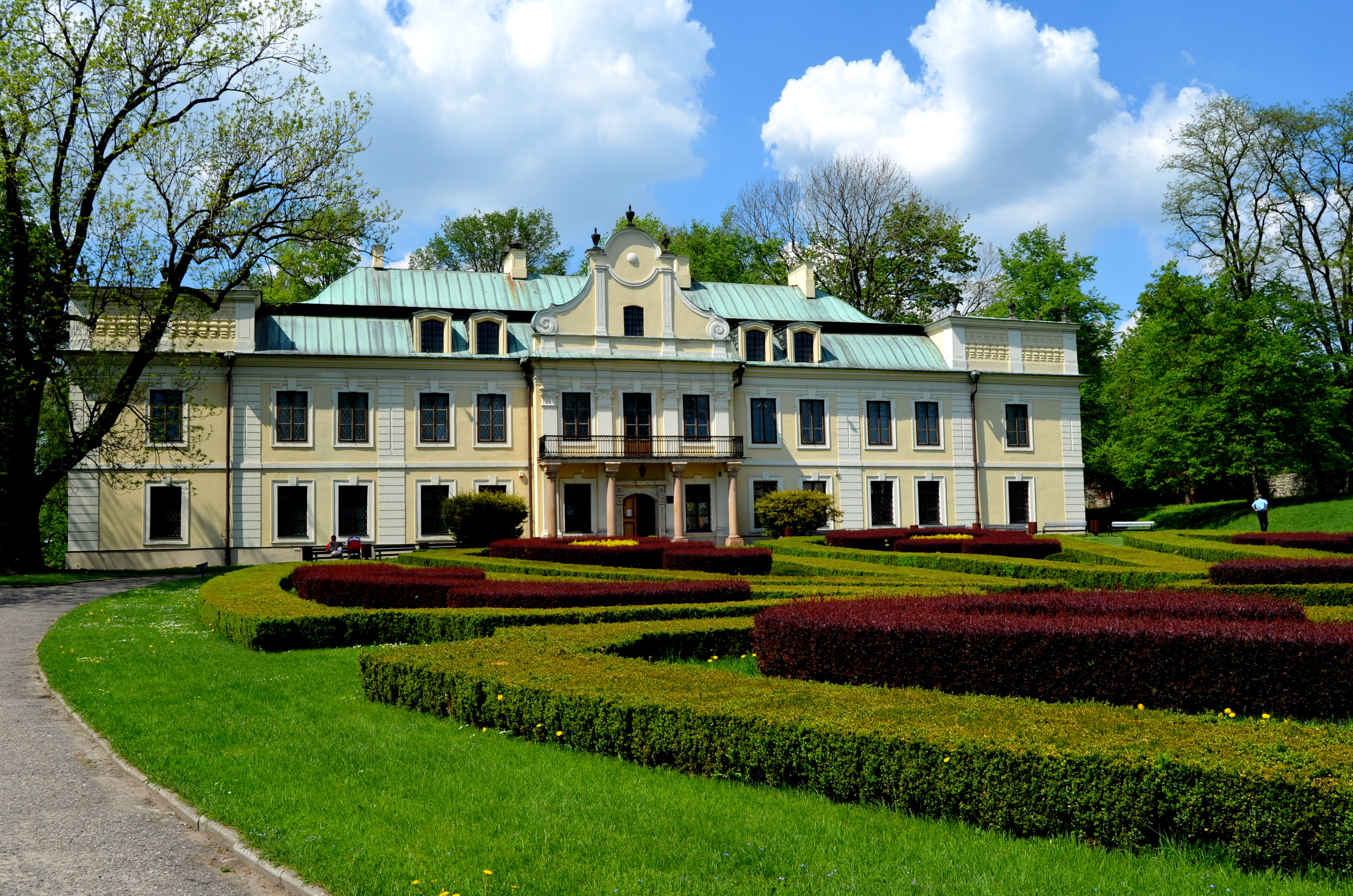
Mieroszewski Palace, now a museum

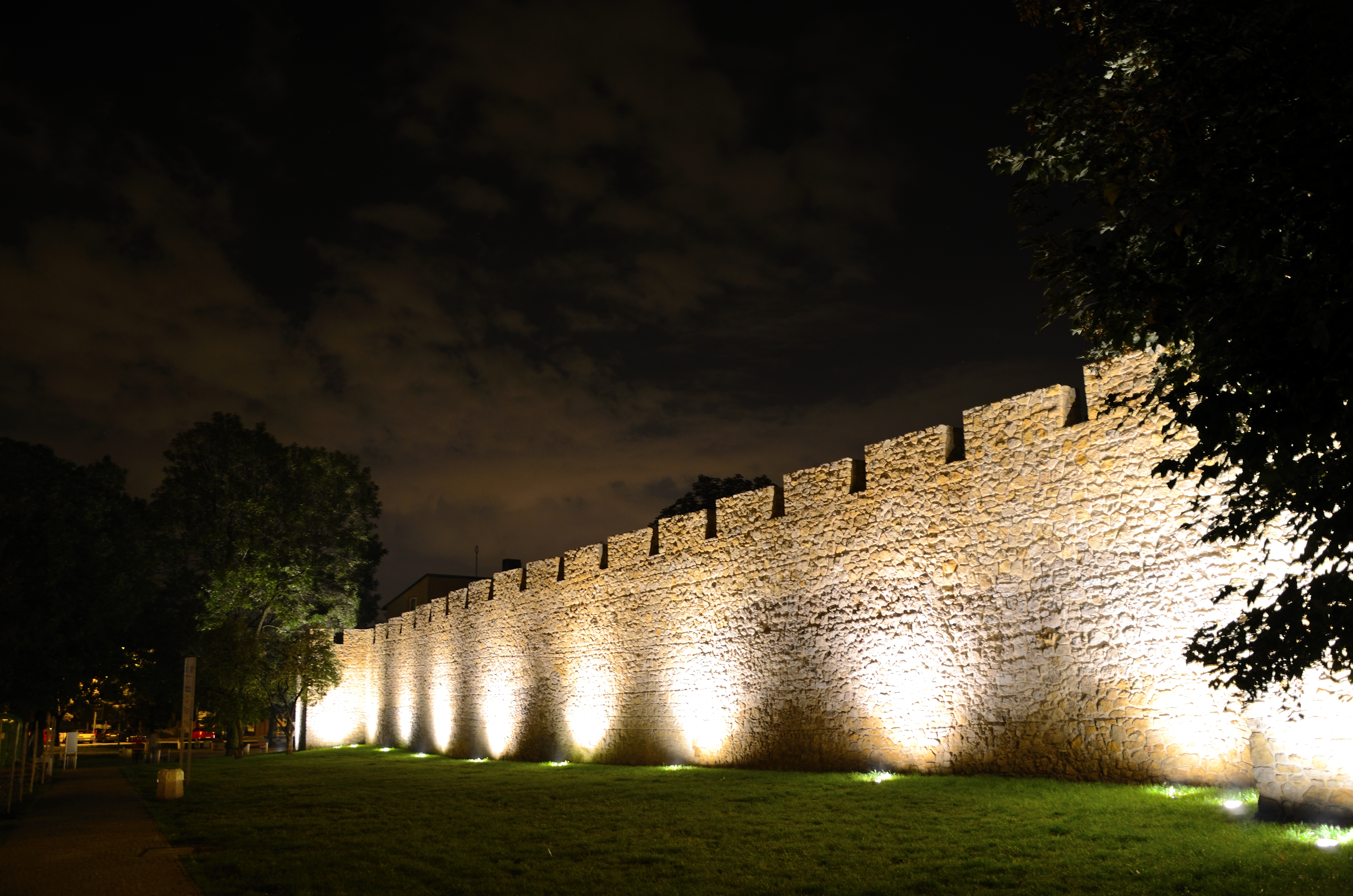
Medieval town walls

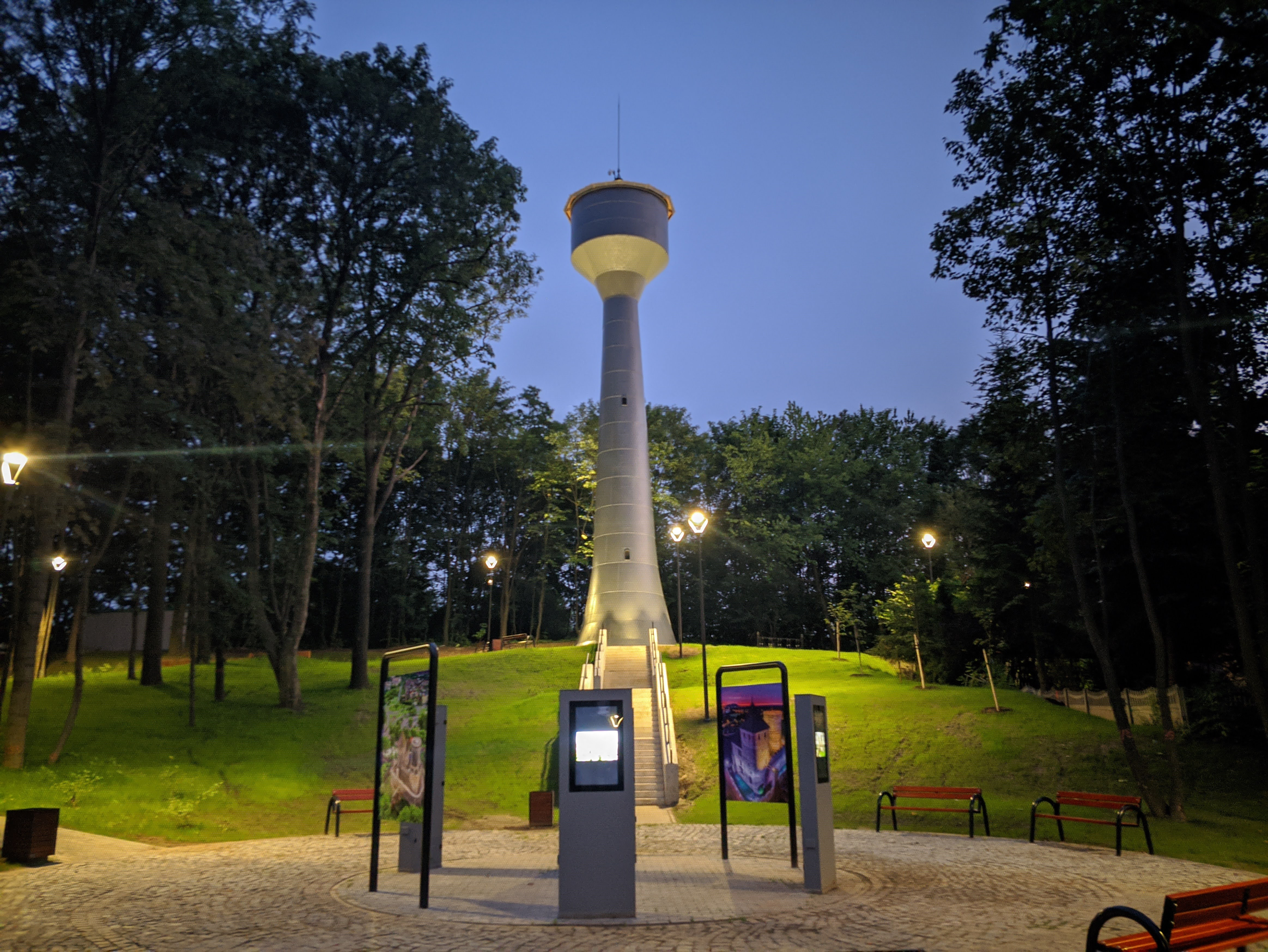
Unique riveted water tower

== Notable people ==
- Isser (Birencwajg) Be'eri (1901–1958), Director of the Haganah Intelligence Service
- Grzegorz Dolniak (1960–2010), politician
- Janusz Gajos (born 1939), actor
- Monika Jarosińska (born 1974), actress and singer
- Chajka Klinger (1917–1958), leader of the Jewish Fighting Organization in Będzin Ghetto
- Andrzej Kubica (born 1972), footballer
- Rutka Laskier (1929–1943), diarist; Holocaust victim
- Menachem Lior / Liwer (1928–2017), activist of the resistance, Israeli army colonel
- Arno Lustiger (1924-2012), historian, father of the author Gila Lustiger and cousin to Jean-Marie Lustiger, archbishop of Paris
- Saul Merin (1933–2012), ophthalmologist
- Hermann Nunberg (1884–1970), psychoanalyst and neurologist, assistant of Carl Jung, disciple of Sigmund Freud
- Fela Perelman-Liwer (1909–1991), writer and activist of the resistance
- Sam Pivnik (1926–2017), Holocaust survivor; writer of Survivor: Auschwitz, The Death March and My Fight for Freedom
- Joshua Prawer (1917–1990), Israeli historian, founder of the crusader studies
- Sigmund Strochlitz (1916–2006), American activist and Holocaust survivor
- Rafał Sznajder (1972–2014), Olympic saber fencer
- Yitzchok Zilberstein (born 1931), Rabbi and halakhist

== Twin towns – sister cities ==
Będzin is twinned with:

- Basse-Ham, France
- Kaišiadorys, Lithuania
- Tatabánya, Hungary

Former twin towns:

- Izhevsk, Russia

In March 2022, Będzin terminated its partnership with the Russian city of Izhevsk as a response to the 2022 Russian invasion of Ukraine.
