= Zagłębie Museum in Będzin =

- Muzeum Zagłębia w Będzinie
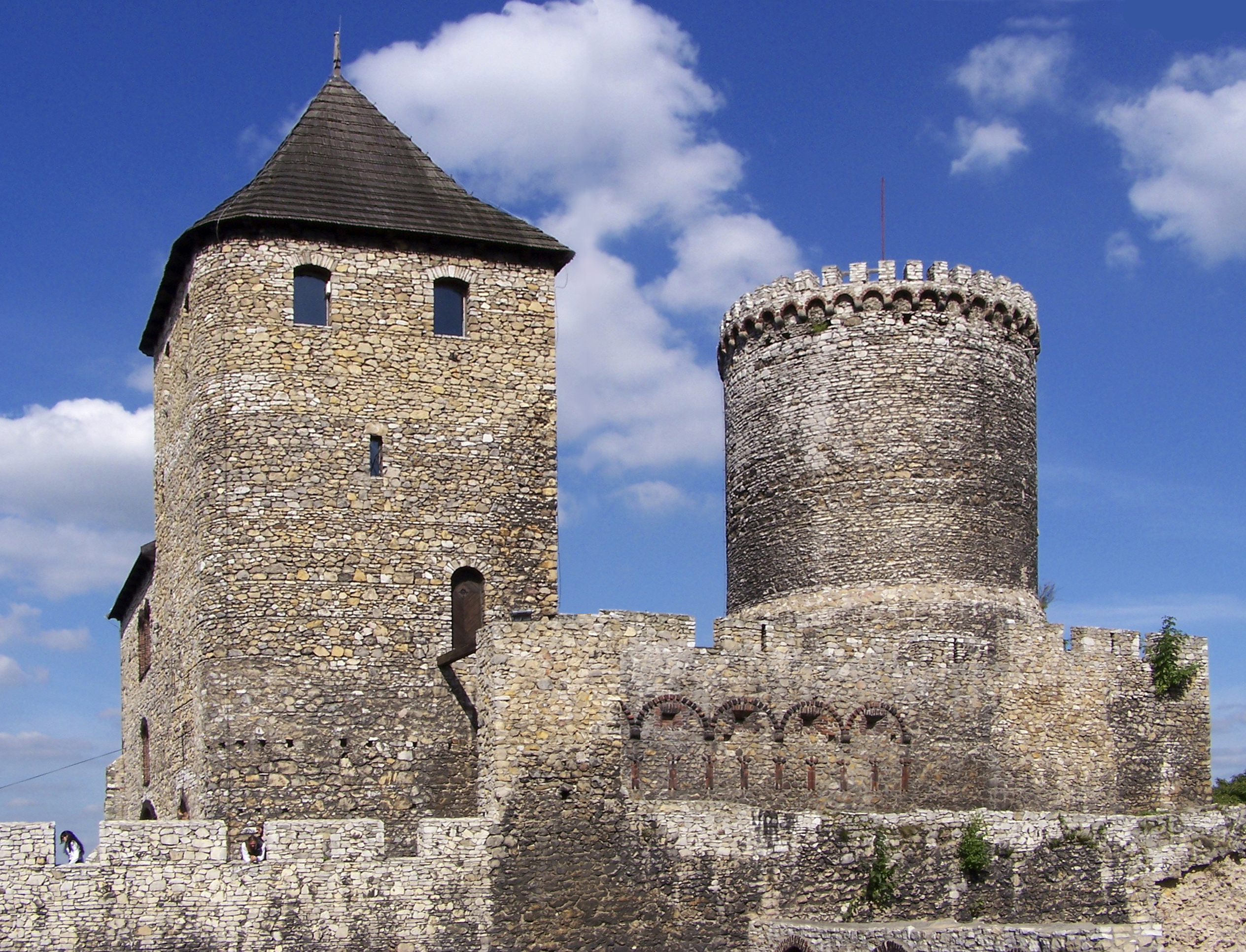
- Będzin Castle – the museum's seat
- Established: 1956
- Location: Będzin, Poland
- Coordinates: 50°19′41.728″N 19°07′43.78″E
- Director: Wioletta Lisowska
- Website: muzeumzaglebia.pl

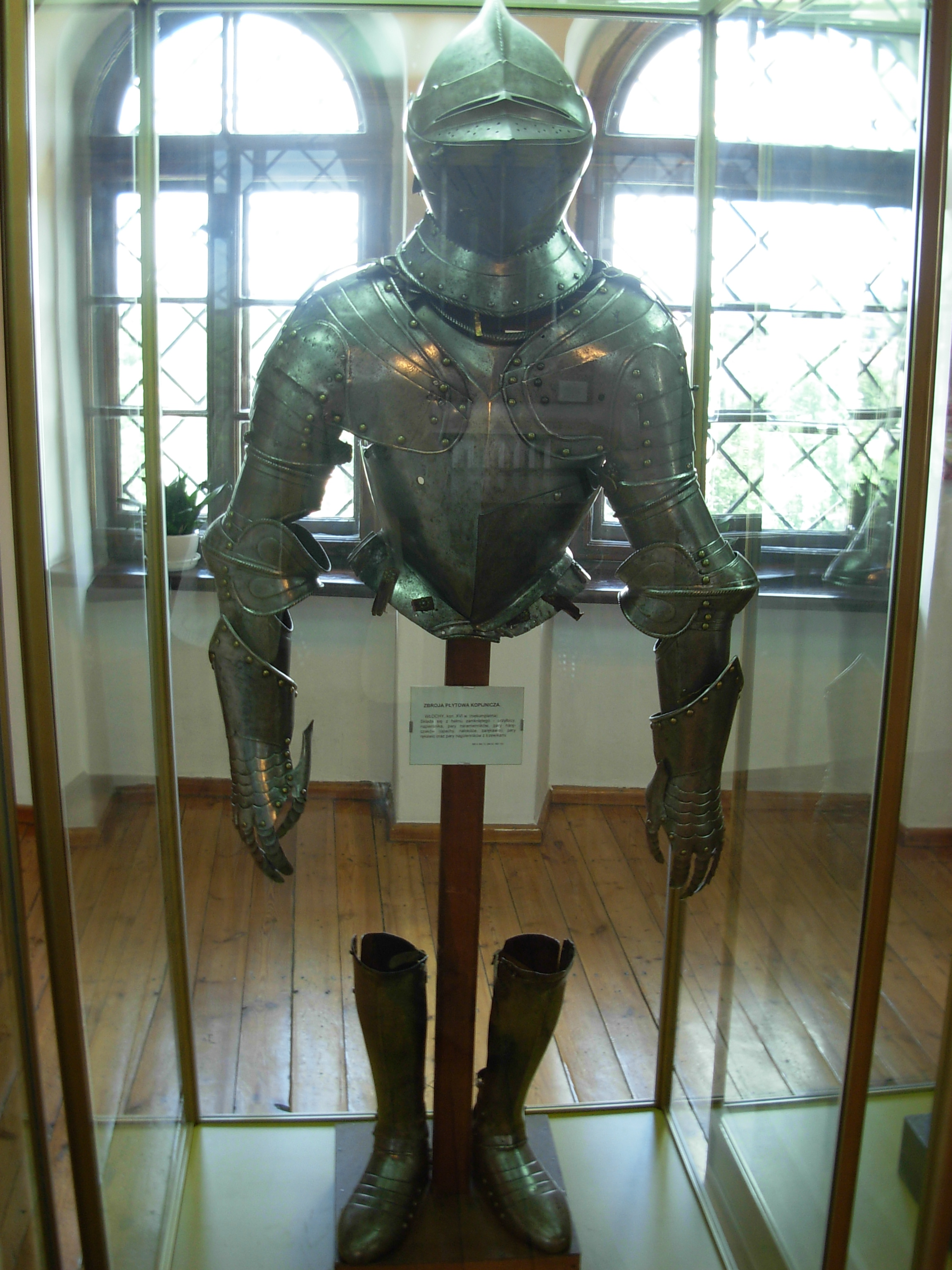
Historical weapons – plate armour

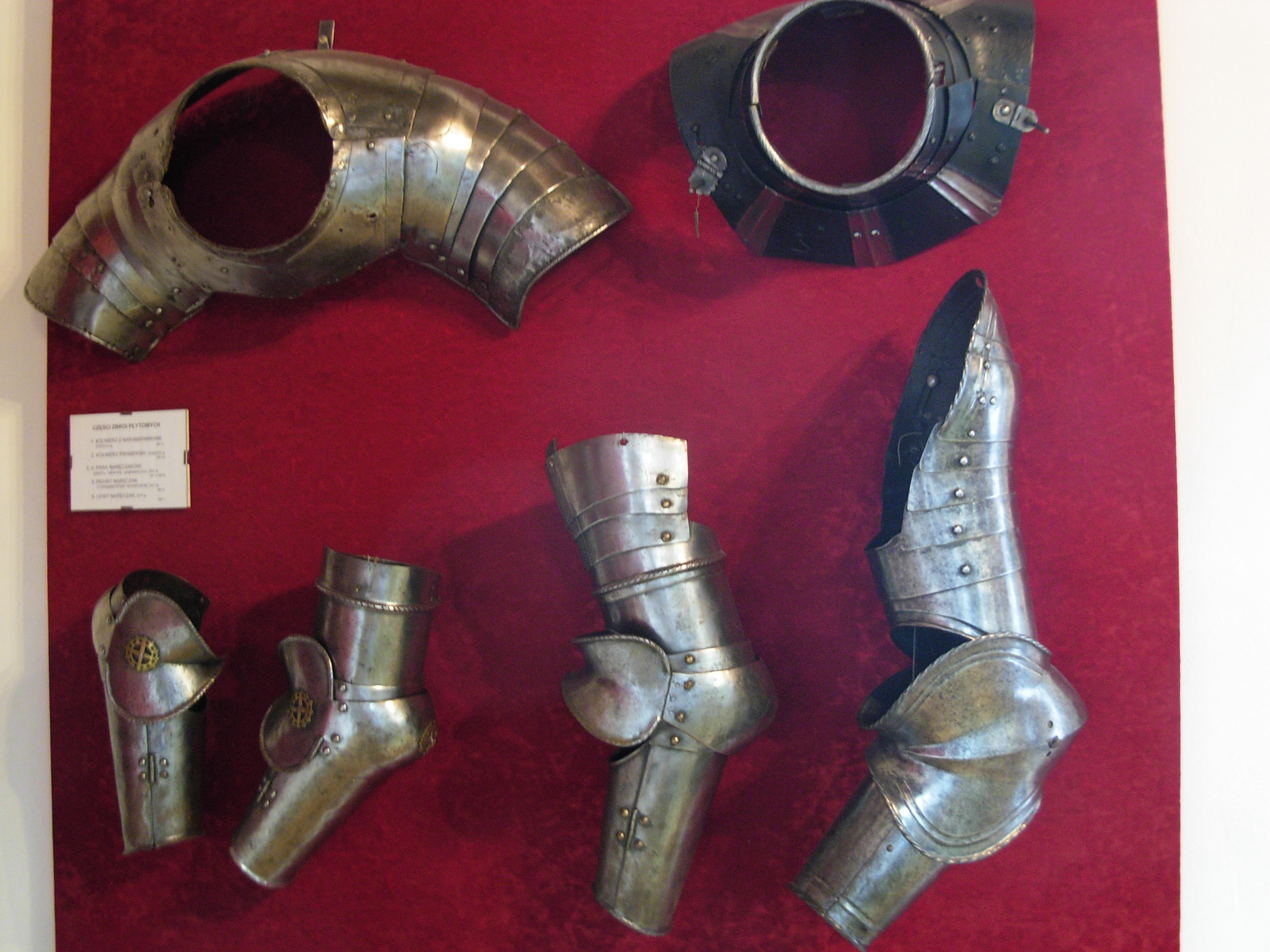
Historical weapons – protective equipment on display

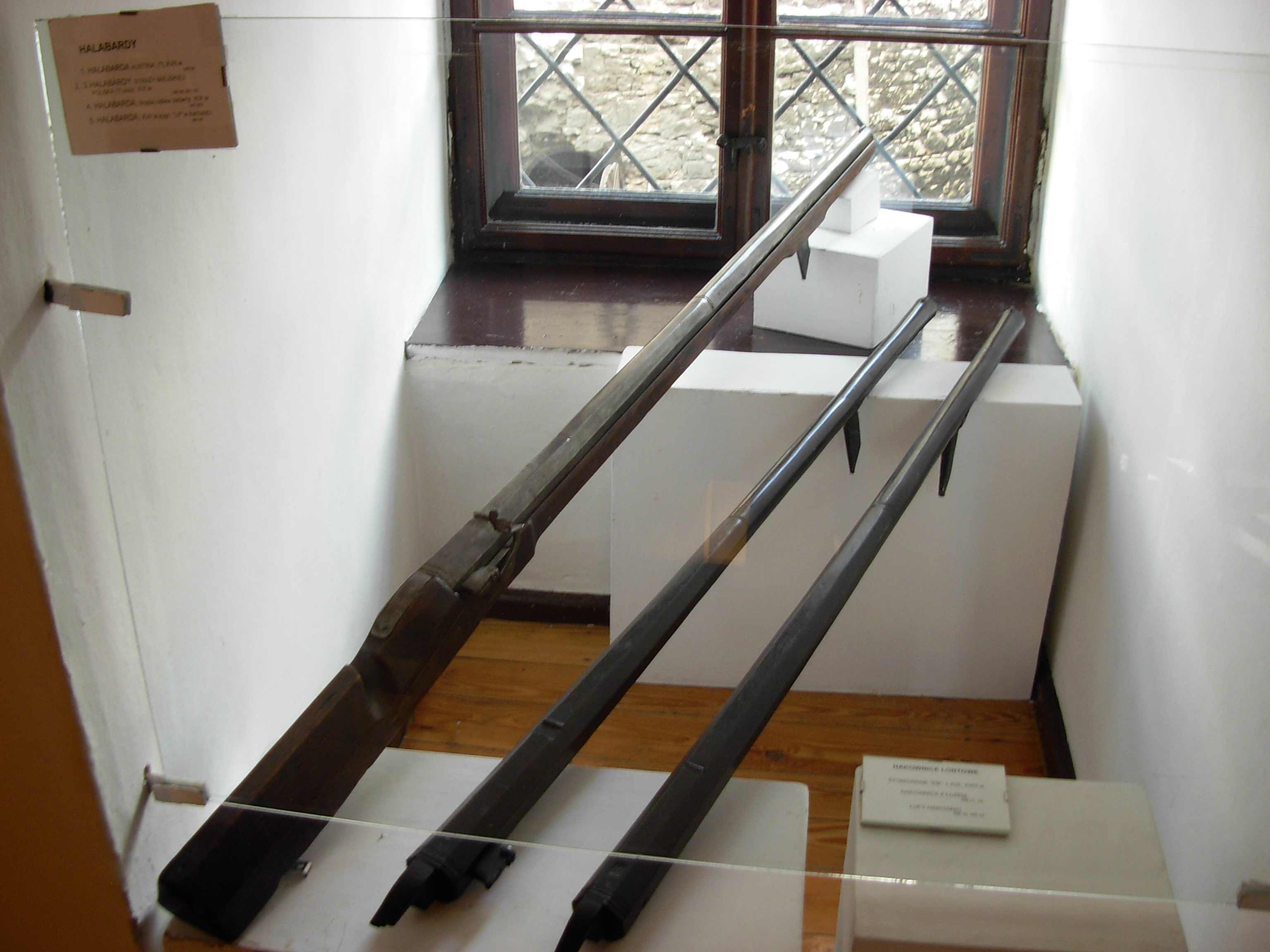
Historical weapons – arquebuses

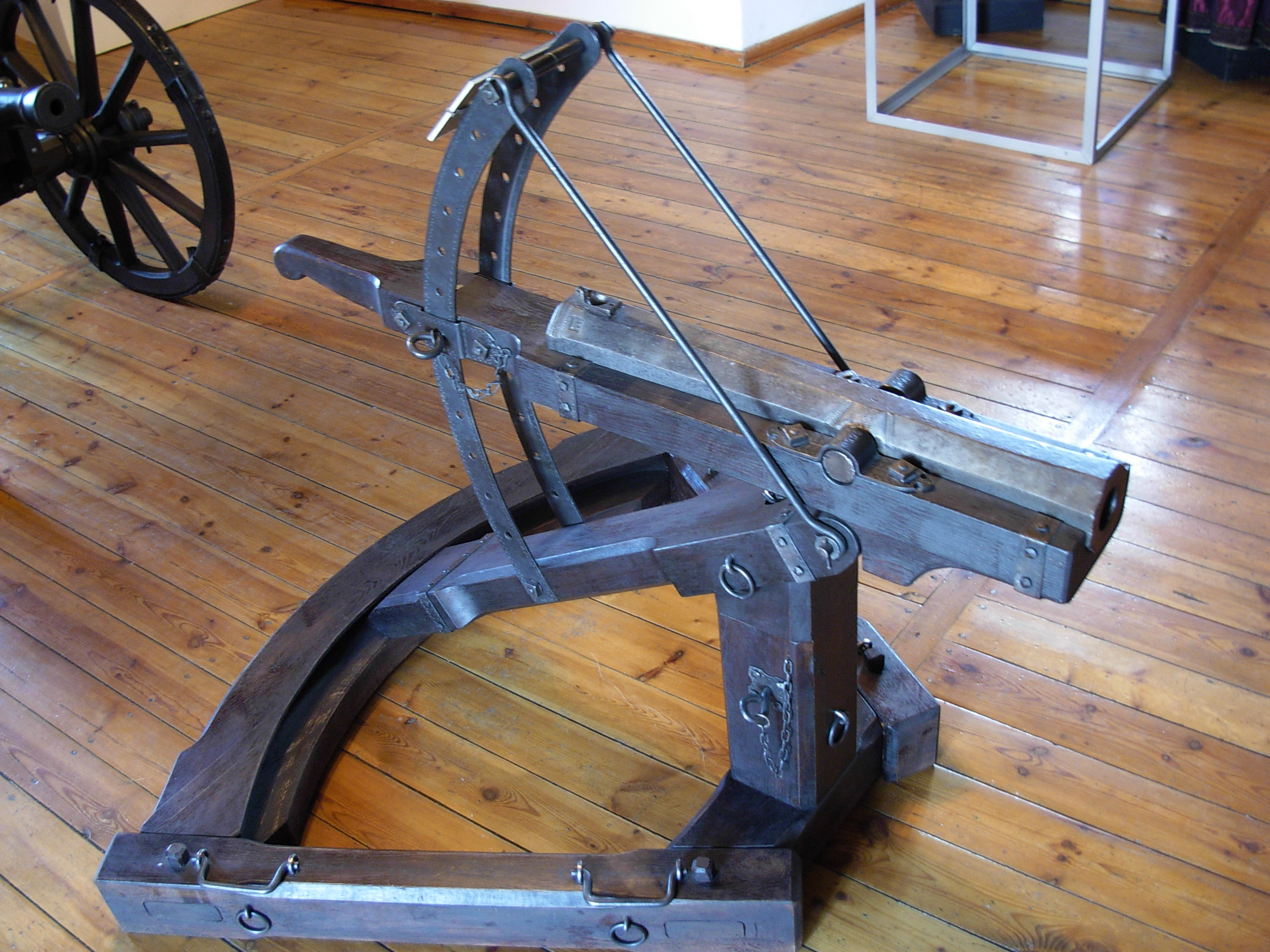
Historical weapons

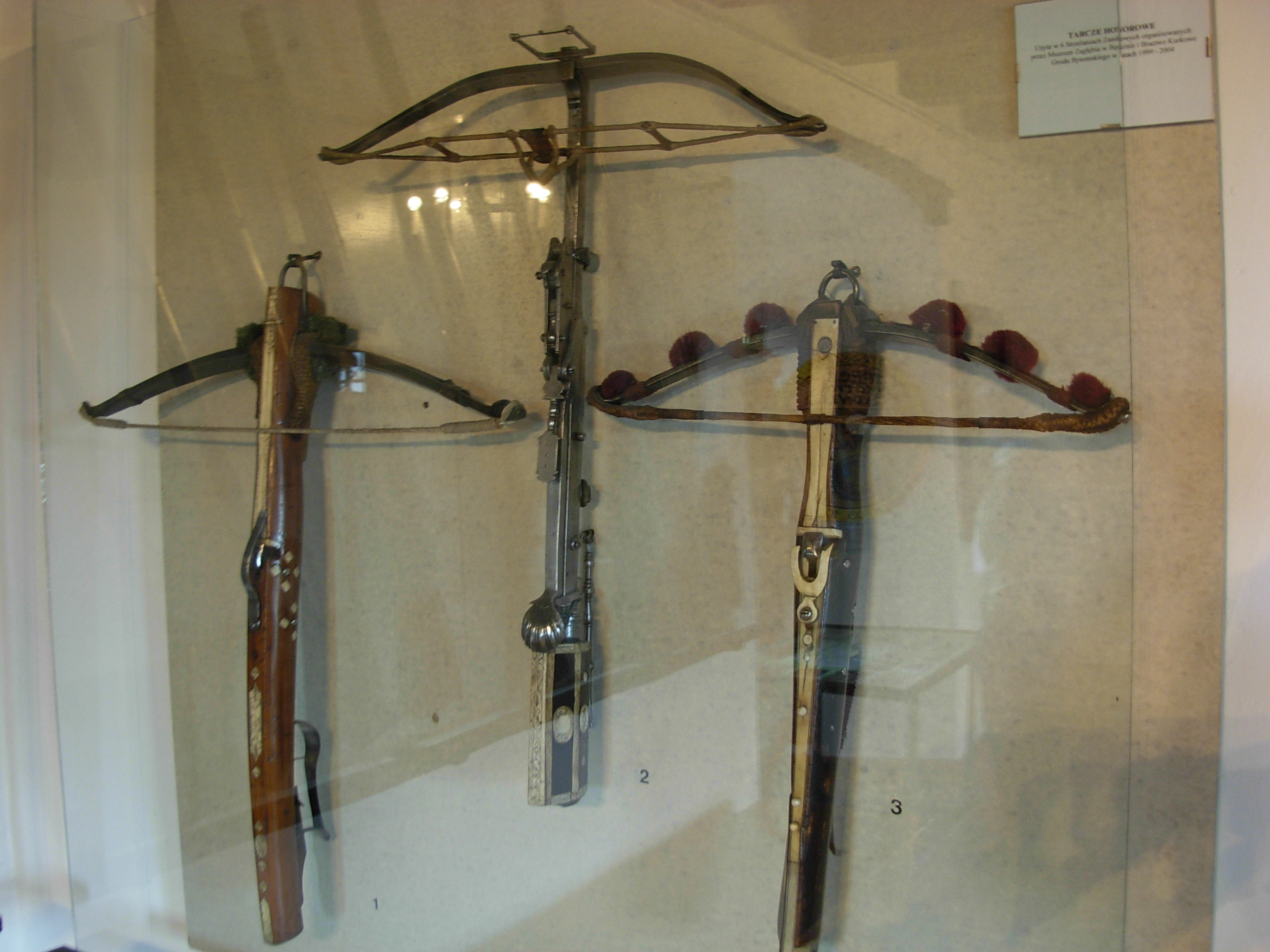
Historical weapons – crossbows

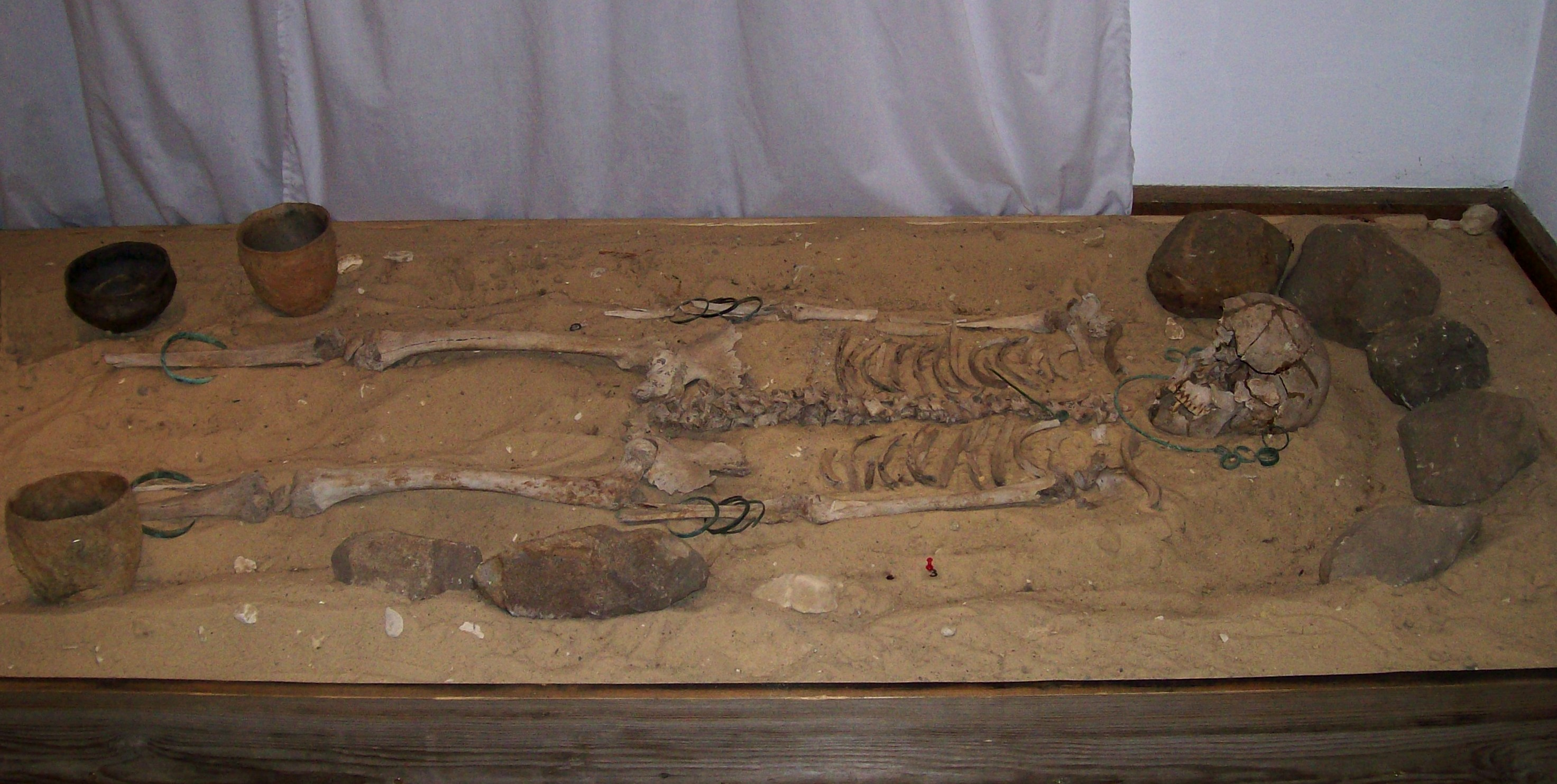
A skeleton grave at the Muzeum Zagłębia – the exhibition In a Lusatian settlement and a medieval stronghold

Zagłębie Museum in Będzin makes available to visitors cultural property and documentation relating to the history of the region. It is housed in two sites: the castle at Zamkowa Street and the Mieroszewski Palace at Gzichowska Street. In addition, museum sites include the Będzin Underground, the former Jewish prayer house “Mizrachi” at Potockiego 3, the city walls, and Castle Hill. The institution operates under a statute adopted by the Będzin City Council and approved by the minister of culture and national heritage. The museum's premises also host the Jan Dorman Foundation, the Polish Numismatic Society (Zagłębie Branch), the Union of Combatants of the Republic of Poland and Former Political Prisoners, as well as an inn and the 1st Company of the Black Knight of the Będzin Castellany.

== History ==
Muzeum Zagłębia in Będzin was established in 1956 on the initiative of the Society for the Care of Castle Hill, the Society of the Museum of the Dąbrowa Basin in Będzin, and the Municipal Social Committee for the Reconstruction of the Castle. The institution was opened to mark the 600th anniversary of Będzin receiving town rights on 22 July 1956. In 1945–1983, the museum was located only in the castle and was the first museum institution in the Zagłębie Dąbrowskie. In 1983, a second site was opened in the 18th-century palace-and-park complex of the Mieroszewski family in Będzin (in Gzichów). The current director is Wioletta Lisowska.

== Activities ==
The core responsibilities of Muzeum Zagłębia include:

- acquiring cultural property and documentation related to regional history through purchases, allocations, bequests, donations, deposits, and through field research;
- maintaining scholarly records, inventorying, and classifying collections;
- storing collections under conditions ensuring their safety and accessibility for research;
- securing and conserving collections;
- organising and conducting scholarly research within the disciplines represented;
- organising permanent exhibitions, temporary exhibitions, and travelling exhibitions;
- educational activity;
- making collections available for scholarly, educational, and exhibition purposes;
- preparing and publishing inventories, catalogues, exhibition guides, and other scholarly and popular-science publications;
- maintaining a library in relevant and auxiliary disciplines and providing access to its holdings for researchers, students, and teachers;
- staff training;
- substantive and training cooperation with other museums;
- cooperation with individuals and social organisations whose aims align with the museum's statutory tasks;
- organising other forms of cultural activity such as concerts, theatre performances, competitions, training sessions, conferences, author meetings, and other initiatives (including outdoor events) promoting the palace-and-park complex, the castle, and their collections.

== Departments ==
The museum's organisational structure includes the following departments:

- History;
- Archaeology;
- Ethnography (est. 1964);
- Arms and armour;
- Outreach;
- Art;
- Exhibition design and installation;
- Photography;
- Finance and administration;
- Library.

== Decorations, awards and distinctions ==
Decorations

- Gold Badge of Honour for Merits to the Silesian Voivodeship (2012).
- Honorary Cross of the Bytom Marksmen's Brotherhood for museum director Anna Smogór for cooperation (2001).
- “Badge for merits to the Union of Combatants of the Republic of Poland and Former Political Prisoners” for museum director Wioletta Lisowska (2018).

Awards

- Third prize (archaeological exhibitions category) for organising the exhibition In a Lusatian settlement and a medieval stronghold in the “Museum Event of the Year – Sybilla 2006” competition (2007).
- Third prize for organising the exhibition Historical weapons in the “Museum Event of the Year – Sybilla 2005” competition (2006).
- Award of the Mayor of Będzin and the City Council for lifetime achievements in artistic creativity, promotion and protection of culture (2016).
- Award of the Marshal of the Silesian Voivodeship for Museum Event of 2008 (publications category) for Będzin 1358–2008 (2009).
- Second prize of the Voivodeship Office Department of Culture and Art “For addressing the subject of the martyrdom of Będzin Jews” (1994).
- Third-class award of the Ministry of Culture and Art in the “Most Important Museum Event of the Year” competition for the exhibition Zagłębie and its inhabitants in old photography (1988).
- Third prize of the Voivodeship Office Department of Culture and Art for the exhibitions Edged weapons of the Polish Army 1914–1945 and Będzin militarily (1997).

Distinctions

- Distinction of the Ministry of Culture and National Heritage for organising the exhibition The old pharmacy (2000).
- Distinction of the Ministry of Culture and Art in the “Most Important Museum Event of the Year” competition for organising a scholarly session and the exhibition Kantor Mirski – 100th anniversary of birth (1985).
- Distinction of the Voivodeship Office Department of Culture and Art for the 40th anniversary celebrations of the institution (1998).
- Distinction of the Voivodeship Office Department of Culture and Art for the exhibition Madonna of Guadalupe – Patroness of Mexico (1995).
- Diploma from the editorial board of Dziennik Zachodni (“Our city”) for organising the “4th Crafts and Handicrafts Fair”, winner of the poll “Best summer event 2012 in Będzin County” (2012).
- Diploma of the Voivodeship Office Department of Culture and Art in Katowice for organising a scholarly session and the exhibition Kantor-Mirski – 100th anniversary of birth (1985).

== Exhibitions in the castle ==
Historical weapons

A permanent exhibition occupying rooms on the 1st and 2nd floors of the castle. The two castle halls present a collection showing the development of weapons and armour from the 16th century to the early 20th century. The display includes numerous examples of edged weapons (cutting and pole weapons), firearms, missile weapons, and elements of protective equipment. The collection includes European service weapons as well as ornamental, hunting, and sporting arms, including pieces decorated with mother-of-pearl, ebony, and bone. The first floor presents firearms with shooting accessories and artillery weapons. The holdings are dominated by Western European firearms, including matchlock, flintlock, and percussion-cap weapons. Hunting weapons are also displayed. The room on the second floor presents edged weapons and protective equipment, including armour, helmets, visors, assault helmets, and morions, as well as parts of plate armour such as breastplates, gauntlets, vambraces, and pauldrons.

History of Będzin

The ground-floor room of the castle houses exhibits related to the history of Będzin from its beginnings to the 20th century. These include documents of Będzin guilds and a medieval parchment containing a hymn in honour of St Catherine, the guild's patron saint. Another group comprises maps, plans, memorabilia, and photographs documenting Będzin and the lives of its inhabitants in earlier times. The exhibition also includes stones and bas-reliefs associated with key events in the city's history.

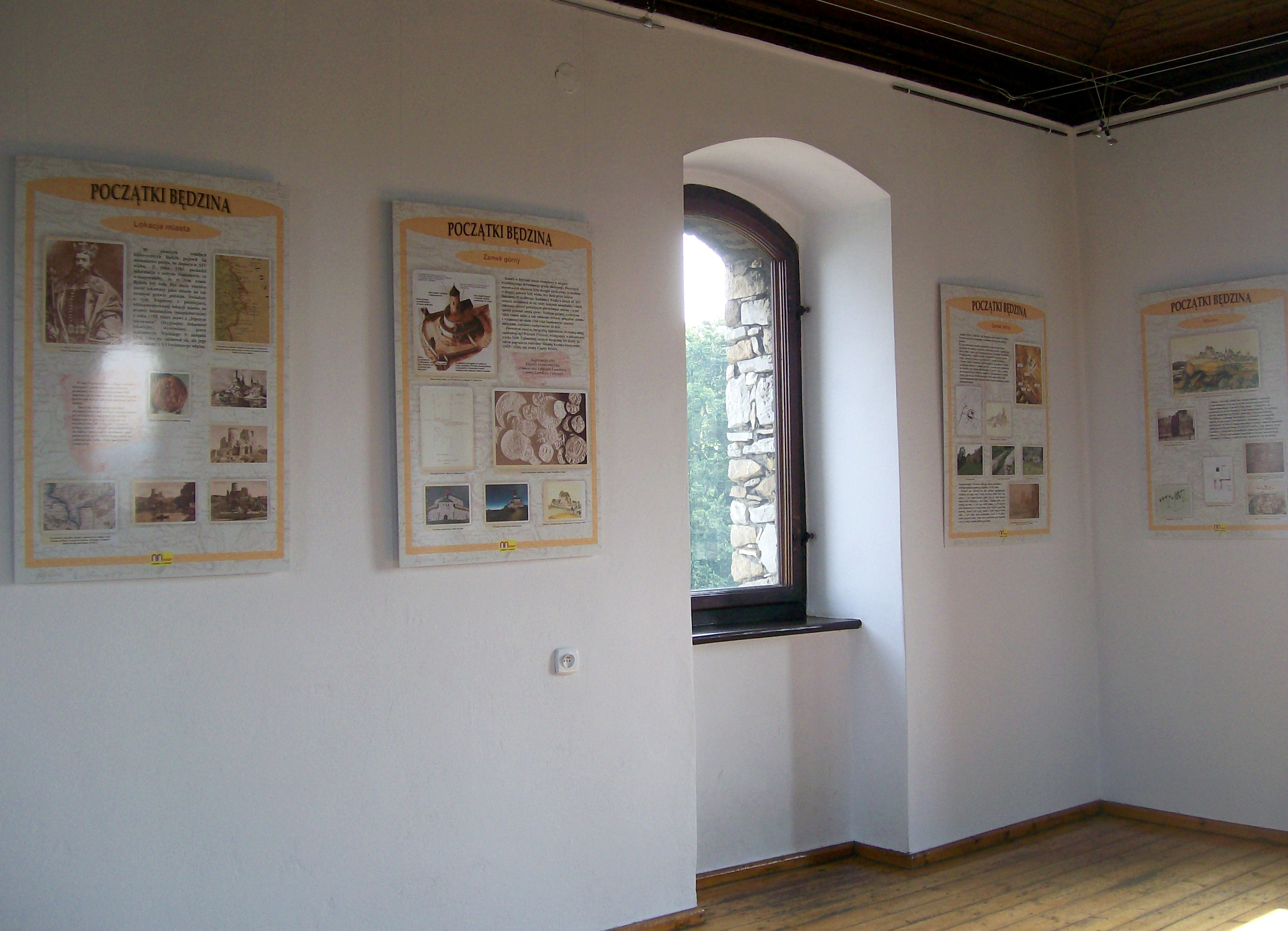
Beginnings of Będzin – a temporary exhibition at the Muzeum Zagłębia

Temporary exhibition Beginnings of Będzin

From 18 June 2008 until the end of the year, the top floor of the castle hosted a panel exhibition about settlement on Castle Hill and the history of Będzin. The exhibition was prepared by the Archaeology and History Departments of Muzeum Zagłębia. Its authors were Aleksandra Rogaczewska and Jarosław Krajniewski; graphic design of the panels was by Bartosz Gawlik.

- The first (archaeological) part of the exhibition comprised seven panels:
  - A settlement of the Lusatian culture from the late Bronze Age and the beginning of the Iron Age;
  - A stronghold from the tribal period – location, administrative relations, defences;
  - Trade contacts of the tribal stronghold;
  - Defence system of the Piast-period stronghold;
  - Craft production in the stronghold;
  - Economic activity within the refugium;
  - Christian burial cemetery.

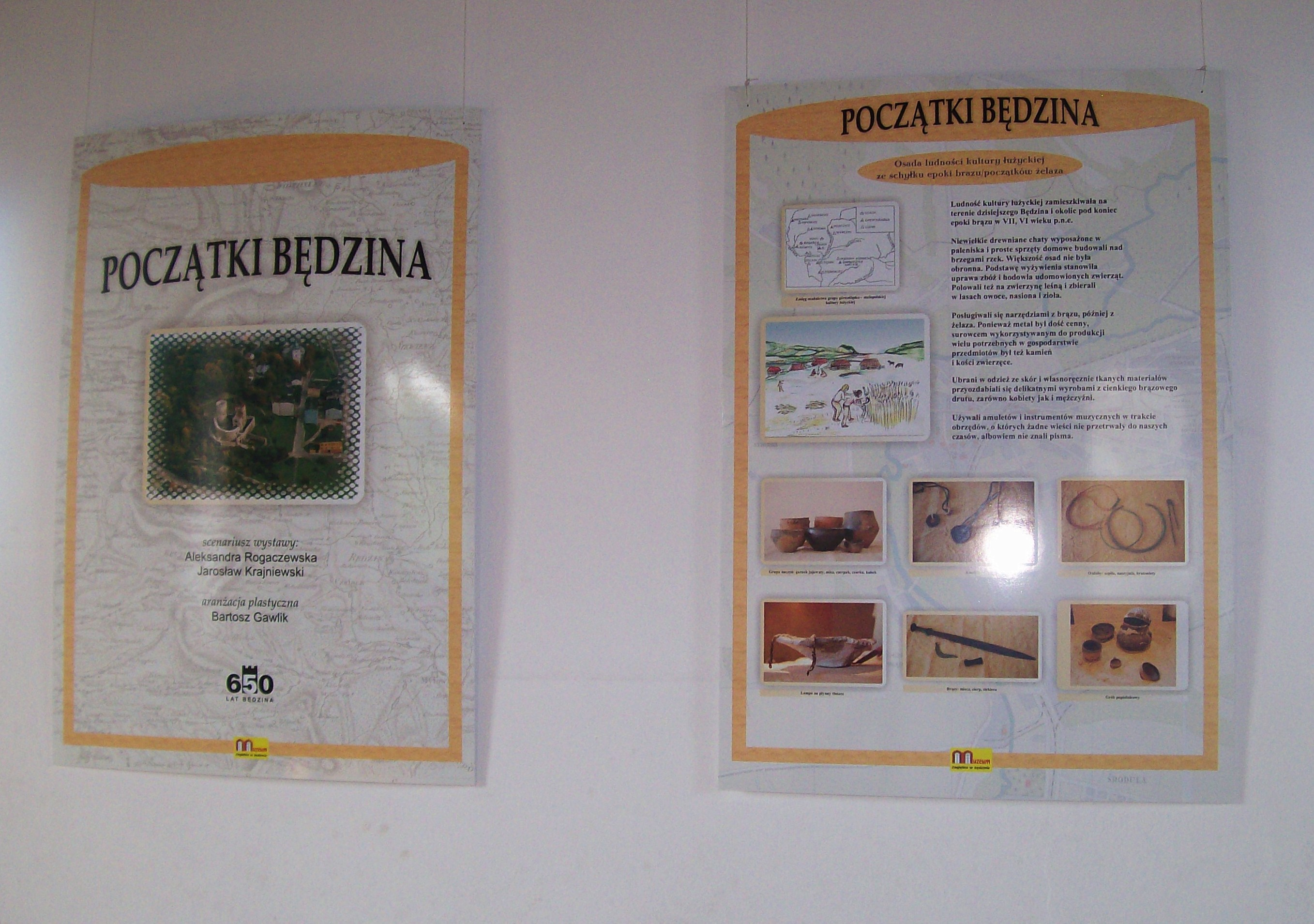
Beginnings of Będzin – a temporary exhibition at the Muzeum Zagłębia

- The second (historical) part of the exhibition comprised eight panels:
  - Town chartering;
  - Upper castle;
  - Lower castle;
  - Town;
  - Church;
  - Privileges and documents;
  - Inhabitants;
  - Coat of arms, seals.

== Exhibitions in the Mieroszewski Palace ==
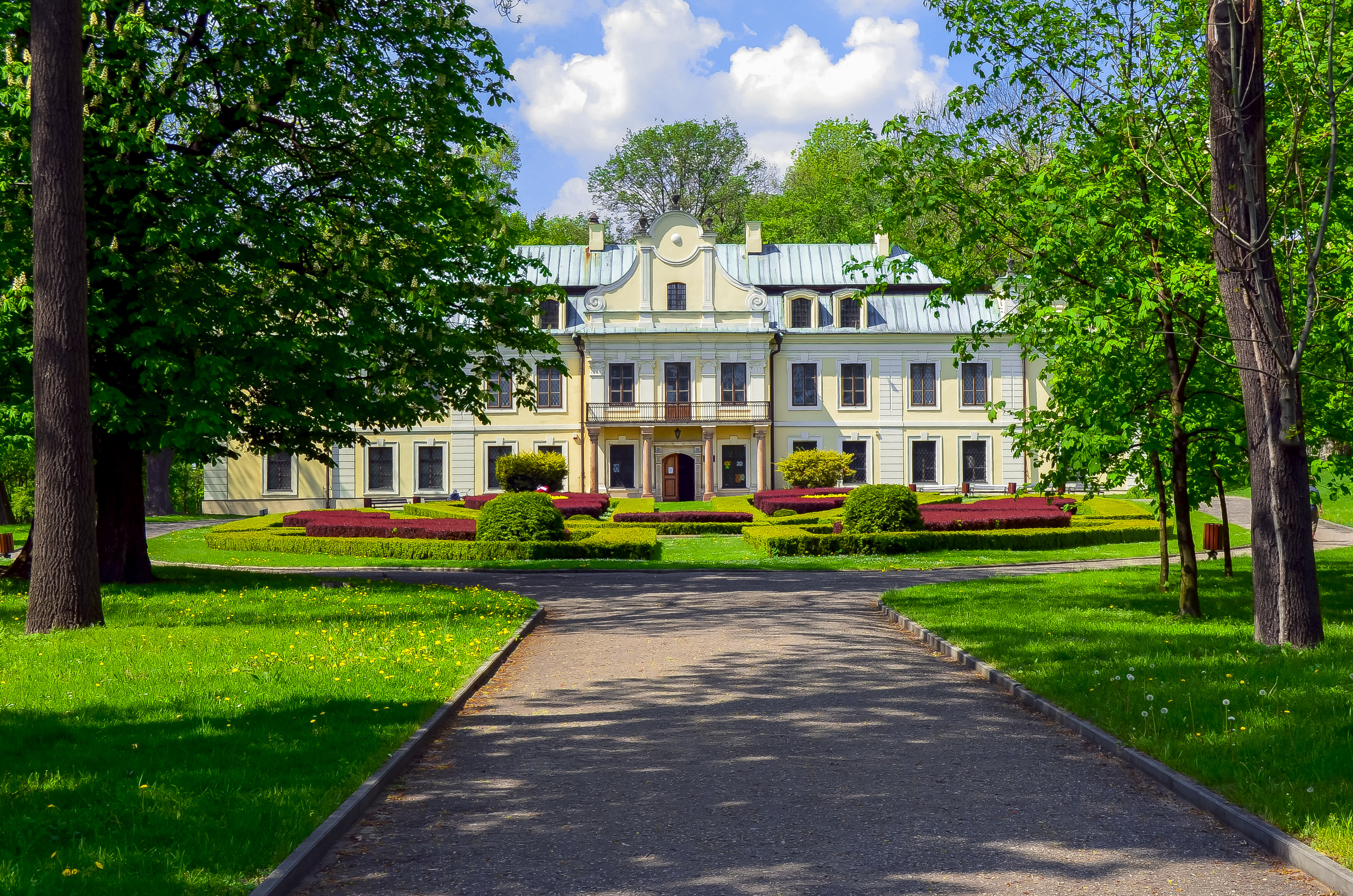
Pałac Mieroszewskich – main entrance

Period interiors of the 18th–19th centuries

The first floor presents historic representative furnishings of the palace, including writing desks, chests of drawers, and armchairs. The salons contain fireplaces, sculptures, period textiles, and items made of silver, porcelain, and pewter collected from nearby bourgeois tenement houses (from the 18th to the early 20th century). The walls display paintings by artists from Będzin and the Dąbrowa Basin. Four salons—“Ancient Commanders”, “Hunting”, “Portrait Medallions”, and “Tournament”—preserve polychromes from the second half of the 18th century depicting, among others, Scipio Africanus, Pompey, Hannibal, and Quintus Fabius Maximus.

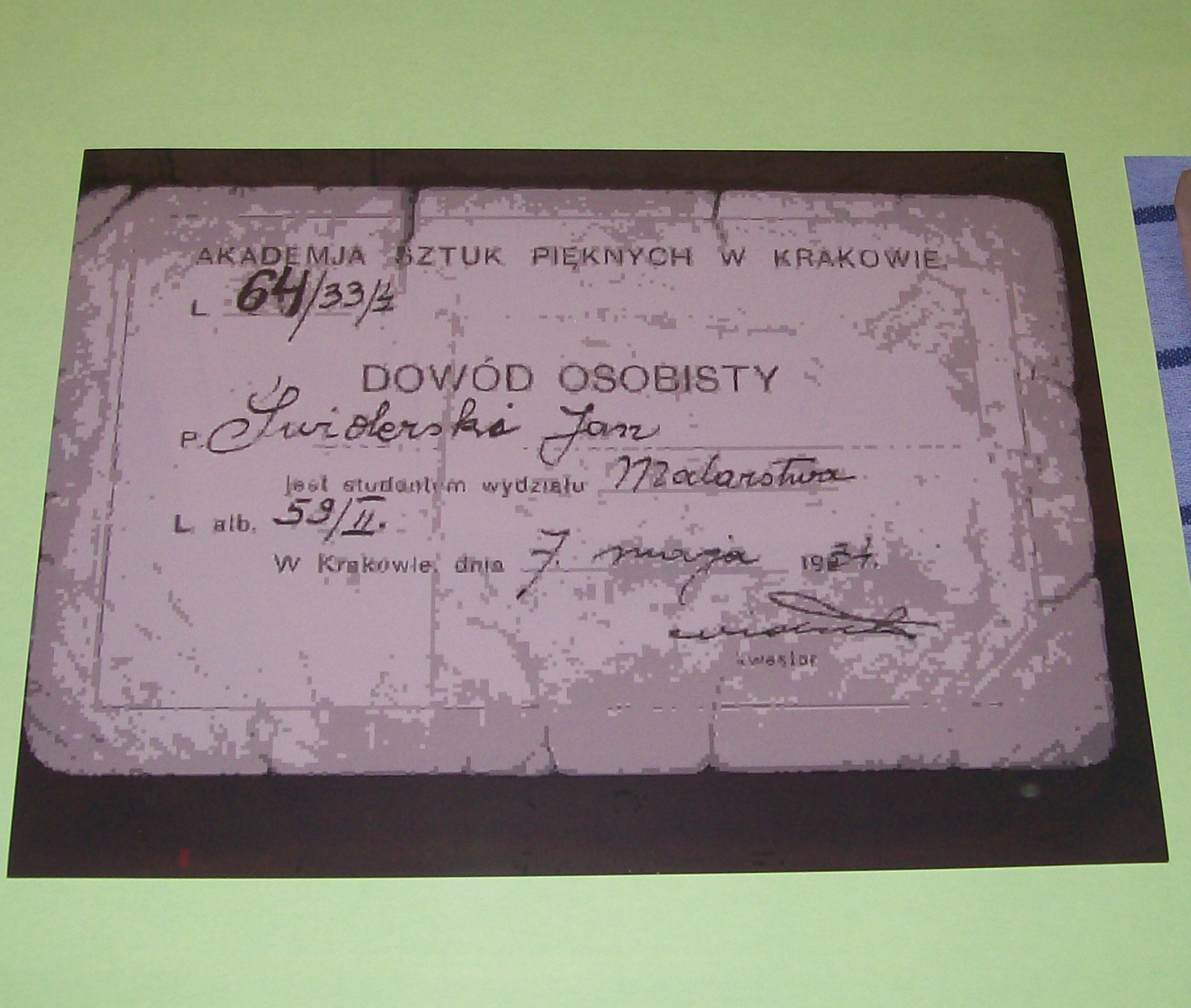
Jan Świderski’s identity card – a document issued by the Academy of Fine Arts in Kraków

Collection of painter and graphic artist Samuel Cygler

One room presents works by the Będzin artist Samuel Cygler, including oil paintings and watercolours. His oeuvre drew mainly on Post-Impressionism and Cubism, and his principal subject was townscapes. The museum holds several dozen works by Cygler. The dedicated room includes, among others, Stalls in Kazimierz, A lane in Kazimierz, and View of the parish church.

Professor Jan Świderski Room

This room contains paintings, photographs, copies of documents, and memorabilia related to the late painter Jan Świderski. The first display was inaugurated on 2 June 2006. The ceremonial opening was attended by the artist's wife Janina Kraupe-Świderska, senator Zbigniew Szaleniec, MP Grzegorz Dolniak, the mayor of Będzin Radosław Baran, the chair of the City Council Sławomir Brodziński, and the museum director Anna Smogór.

Zagłębie room

The ethnographic exhibition reconstructs the interior and equipment of a peasant farmstead (a single-room cottage) from the Dąbrowa Basin from the early 20th century. The house consists of a main room and a vestibule; part of the vestibule is separated as a small byre for cattle. Household tools, vessels, and furniture are displayed inside; agricultural tools and equipment formerly used on the farm are shown in the vestibule and byre area.

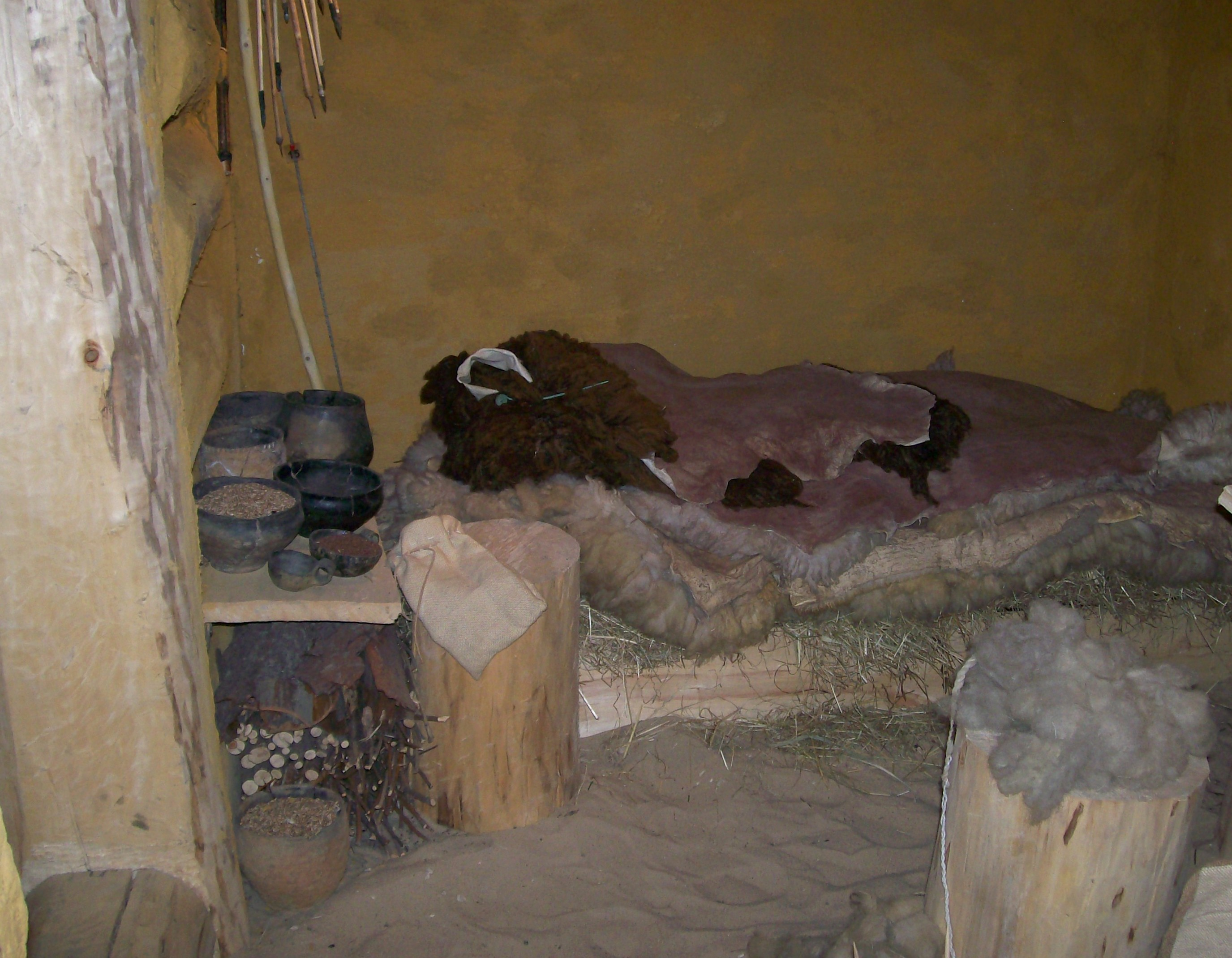
In a Lusatian settlement and a medieval stronghold – an exhibition at the Muzeum Zagłębia

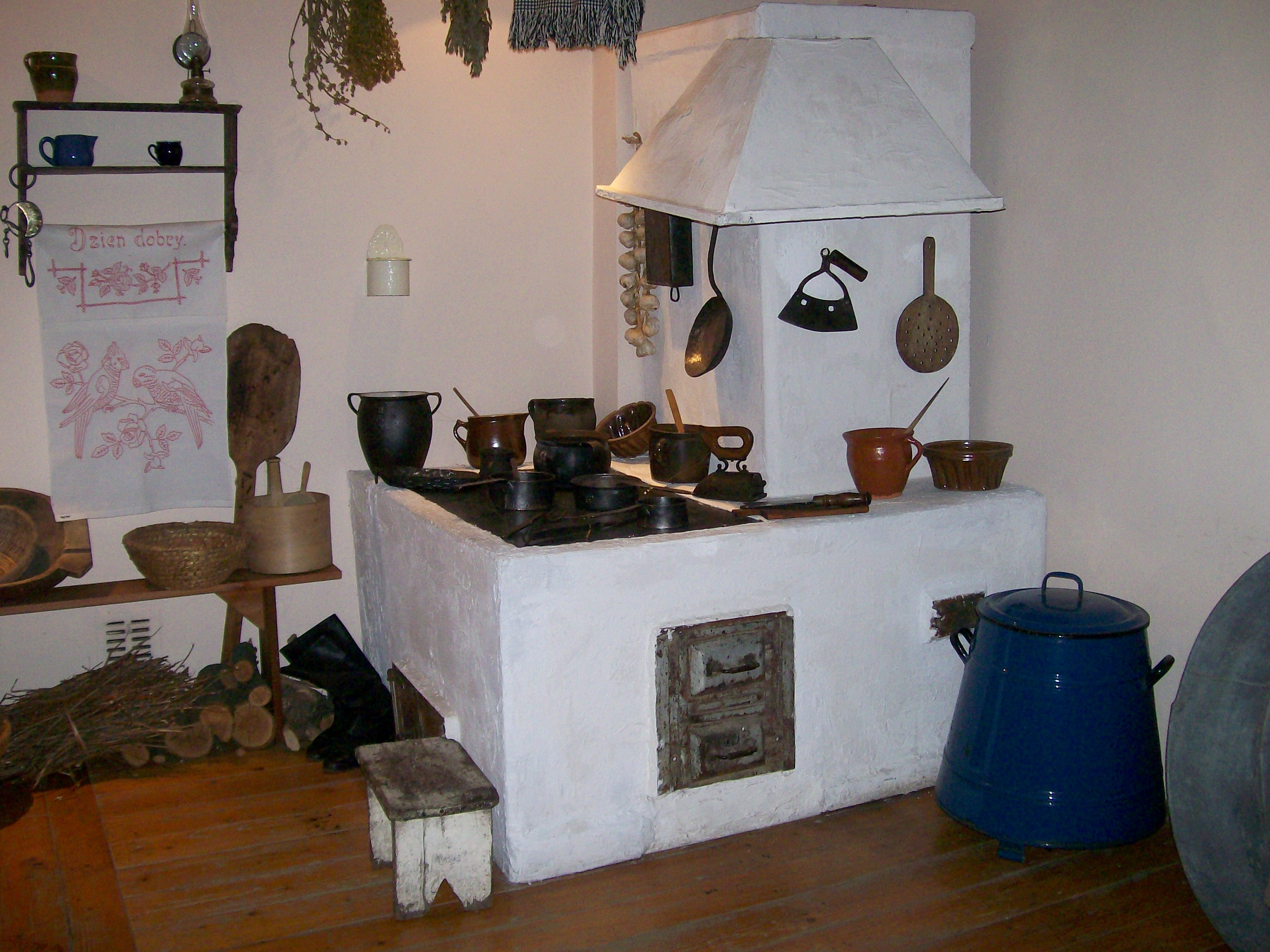
Kitchen in the Zagłębie room – an ethnographic exhibition at the Muzeum Zagłębia

In a Lusatian settlement and a medieval stronghold. Archaeology of the area of today’s Będzin

On the ground floor of the palace, the exhibition reconstructs the interior of a Lusatian hut built in a post-and-plank technique. Inside are a hearth and simple basic equipment. Next to the hut, a reconstructed skeleton grave and an urn burial can also be seen. The second part of the exhibition presents objects from the early Middle Ages connected with the everyday life of the stronghold's inhabitants. Using the museum's holdings, the display reconstructs a forge, a building site, a shoemaker's workshop, and a tanner's workshop. Jewellery made of a variety of materials is also shown, originating from a cemetery discovered on Castle Hill. The exhibition scenario was prepared by archaeologist Aleksandra Rogaczewska; the exhibition design was created by Bartosz Gawlik.

Temporary exhibition From long johns to thongs

A temporary exhibition running until 10 September 2008 presented women's and men's underwear from the last 100 years, including briefs, corsets, slips, nightgowns, robes, and nightwear. The display illustrated changes in underwear fashion over that period. The exhibition was curated by Aleksandra Trella, head of the Clothing Department at the Central Museum of Textiles in Łódź. The underwear collection came from the Central Museum of Textiles in Łódź.

Temporary exhibition Once upon a time in Będzin

To mark the 650th anniversary of Będzin receiving town rights, the museum organised the exhibition Once upon a time in Będzin from 6 May 2008 to 21 September 2008, comprising three parts. The first part presented 20 photographs by Bronisław Arciszewski, who ran a studio in Będzin in the early 20th century. The second part displayed, among other items, negative holders, glass plates, boxes, and a photographic studio with equipment. The third part reconstructed a living interior from the interwar period and included many household objects from that time, such as a sewing machine, a pram, and a gramophone. The originator of the exhibition and author of its scenario was ethnographer Dobrawa Skonieczna-Gawlik; the exhibition design was created by Bartosz Gawlik.
