= Adam Szydłowski =

Polish engineer

- Born: 1860; Żurawłycha, Russian Empire
- Died: 1916 (aged 55–56); Harbin, China
- Occupation: Engineer

Adam Szydłowski (1860 – 1916) was a Polish engineer, co-founder and first mayor of the city of Harbin in Manchuria.

== Biography ==
In early 1898, the Chief Construction Directorate of the Chinese Eastern Railway decided to send a technical expedition to Manchuria to find a suitable location near the Sungari River for setting up administrative offices. Adam Szydłowski led the expedition, which departed from Vladivostok on March 8, 1898, and reached Asyche on April 10, 1898. The next day, Szydłowski decided to establish the city of Harbin in the area. In April 1898, Szydłowski purchased a distillery called Sian-Fan, which had been inactive due to being plundered by Honghuzi. This distillery was bought for 12 thousand taels (453.6 kilograms) of silver. The administrative headquarters of the Chinese Eastern Railway were then established there. In May 1898, engineers and railway construction officials arrived in Harbin and began settling the city.
