= Sigmund Strochlitz =

American activist and Holocaust survivor

- Born: December 20, 1916; Będzin, Poland
- Died: October 16, 2006 (aged 89); New London, Connecticut
- Citizenship: Polish, German, American
- Education: Jagiellonian University
- Occupations: Activist, entrepreneur

Sigmund Strochlitz (December 20, 1916 – October 16, 2006) was a Polish-born Jewish American entrepreneur, political activist, and Holocaust survivor. He served on the U.S. President's Commission on the Holocaust and the U.S. Holocaust Memorial Council from 1978 to 1986, establishing the United States Holocaust Memorial Museum. Strochlitz was the first chair of the council's Days of Remembrance committee, persuading state and federal officials to hold annual Holocaust commemorations in all fifty state capitals and in Washington, D.C. in 1985 and every year since. According to the Encyclopedia Judaica, Strochlitz was a "major figure in institutionalizing Holocaust commemoration" throughout the United States.

== Biography ==
Born in Będzin, Poland, Strochlitz studied economics at Jagiellonian University in Kraków before Nazi Germany invaded Poland in 1939. Between August 1943 and April 1945, he survived more than two years in Nazi concentration camps, including fifteen months at Auschwitz. His parents, sister and first wife were murdered in Auschwitz. While living in Germany in 1945, Strochlitz married Rose Grinberg (1913–2001), a fellow Polish-born Holocaust survivor. They had four children (Jaime, Rafael, Halina, and Romana), fourteen grandchildren, and twenty-three great-grandchildren.

Emigrating to New York in 1951, Strochlitz sold automobiles on Long Island before purchasing a car dealership, Whaling City Ford, in New London, Connecticut, in 1957. He built the business into a local institution and continued to run Whaling City Ford for almost fifty years until he died in 2006. Strochlitz's heirs inherited and expanded the business before finally selling it in 2020.

Strochlitz was a close friend and collaborator of Elie Wiesel. For many years Strochlitz functioned as "Wiesel's chief lieutenant, his eyes and ears." During the 1980s, Strochlitz spearheaded an international campaign for Wiesel to receive the Nobel Peace Prize, lobbying numerous international leaders and heads of state. Wiesel became a Nobel laureate in 1986.

Strochlitz became a member of the Presidential Commission on the Preservation of Americans' Heritage Abroad in 1992. At various times he served as president of the American Friends of Haifa University, a governor of Bar-Ilan University, a founding member of the American Society for Yad Vashem, a trustee of the American Jewish Congress, and a member of the board of Lawrence + Memorial Hospital. Awards included the Elie Wiesel Remembrance Award (1986), the National Holocaust Remembrance Tribute (1986), and the Ellis Island Medal of Honor (1997). Strochlitz was appointed a Chevalier of the French Republic's Ordre des Arts et des Lettres in 1993. He held honorary doctorates from Connecticut College, Haifa University, and Bar Ilan University.

== Legacy ==
A philanthropist, he endowed the Strochlitz Institute of Holocaust Studies at Haifa University, the Strochlitz Judaic Teaching Fellowship at Bar-Ilan University, the Rose and Sigmund Strochlitz Holocaust Resource Center of the Jewish Federation of Eastern Connecticut, and the Rose and Sigmund Strochlitz Travel Grants at the University of Connecticut.
