= Hakoah =

Hakoah (Hebrew: הכח) means "The Strength" and may refer to any one of these Jewish sport organizations:

- Hakoah Vienna, an athletic club in Austria that is the origin of the Hakoah name
- Hakoah Bergen County, an amateur football club in New Jersey
- Brooklyn Hakoah, a defunct football club in the United States of America
- Hakoach Bedzin (Hakoah) a defunct Jewish sport organization, Poland
- Hakoah Berlin, a defunct football club in Berlin, Germany
- Club Náutico Hacoaj, a sport club in Argentina
- FC Hakoah, a football club in Switzerland
- Hakoah All-Stars, a defunct football club in the United States of America
- Hakoah Amidar Ramat Gan F.C., a football club in Israel
- Melbourne Hakoah, a defunct football club in Australia
- New York Hakoah, a defunct football club in the United States of America
- Hakoah Stanisławów a defunct football club in Ukraine
- Hakoah Sydney City East FC a football club in Australia
- Hakoah Riga, a defunct football club in Latvia
- Hakoah Prague, a Jewish sport club in Prague
- Hakoah Centers, a defunct football club in Chicago
