= Będzin Castle =

Castle in Będzin, Poland

Będzin Royal Castle
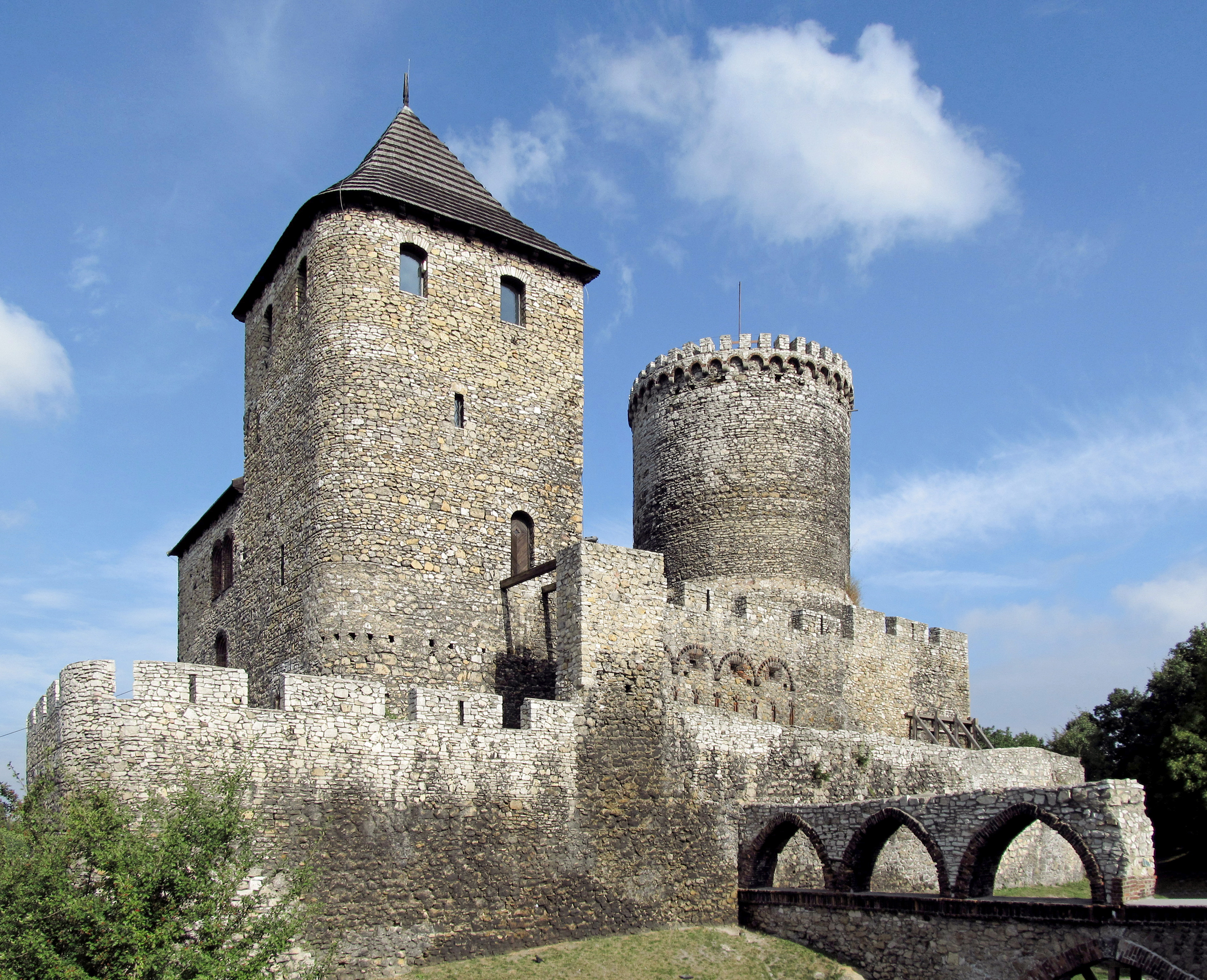

General information
- Architectural style: Polish Gothic
- Location: Będzin, Poland
- Coordinates: 50°19′38″N 19°07′45″E
- Construction started: 13th century
- Completed: 1348
- Client: Casimir III the Great

The Będzin Castle is a castle in Będzin in southern Poland. The stone castle dates to the 14th century, and is predated by a wooden fortification that was erected in the 11th century. It was an important fortification in the Kingdom of Poland and later, the Polish–Lithuanian Commonwealth.

== History ==
The village of Będzin originated in the 9th century. The local wooden fort, that the records show existed as early as the 11th century, was destroyed during the Mongol invasions in 1241 and subsequently rebuilt.

During the reign of Casimir III the Great the castle received an upgrade from wooden fortress to a stone one. The stone castle was operational as early as in 1348. The growing trading village of Bytom was given Magdeburg Law city rights shortly afterwards, in 1358.

The castle was meant to be a military outpost on the southwestern border of the Kingdom of Poland (later, the Polish–Lithuanian Commonwealth). It was the most westward fortification, and was meant to hold off any invasion coming to Lesser Poland from Bohemian or Silesian lands. In 1364 the castle was visited by Charles IV, Holy Roman Emperor. In 1588, Maximilian III, Archduke of Austria, was held prisoner in here, after his defeat in the War of the Polish Succession (1587–1588).

The castle fell into disrepair in the late 16th century. The fire of 1616 and damage during The Deluge in 1657 resulted in the further destruction. The fortress was periodically repaired, but due to shifts in the layout of the borders and relations between Poland and its neighbours, it lost much of its importance. After the partitions of Poland, Będzin fell into Prussian control and the castle became property of the Hohenzollern family. In 1807, the nearby lands were transferred to the Duchy of Warsaw, and in 1815, to the Congress Poland. In 1825 the castle was virtually falling apart, and when a piece of the stone crushed a passerby, demolition of the castle was ordered, but before it was started, the castle was declared a monument. In the 1830s the castle was bought by Count Edward Raczyński and partially rebuilt, with a Protestant church temporarily housed inside, but after Raczyński's death in 1845 plans to open an academy or a hospital there were abandoned, and the castle once again fell into disrepair.

The castle was not rebuilt again until the times of People's Republic of Poland, when in 1952–1956, a museum was opened there.

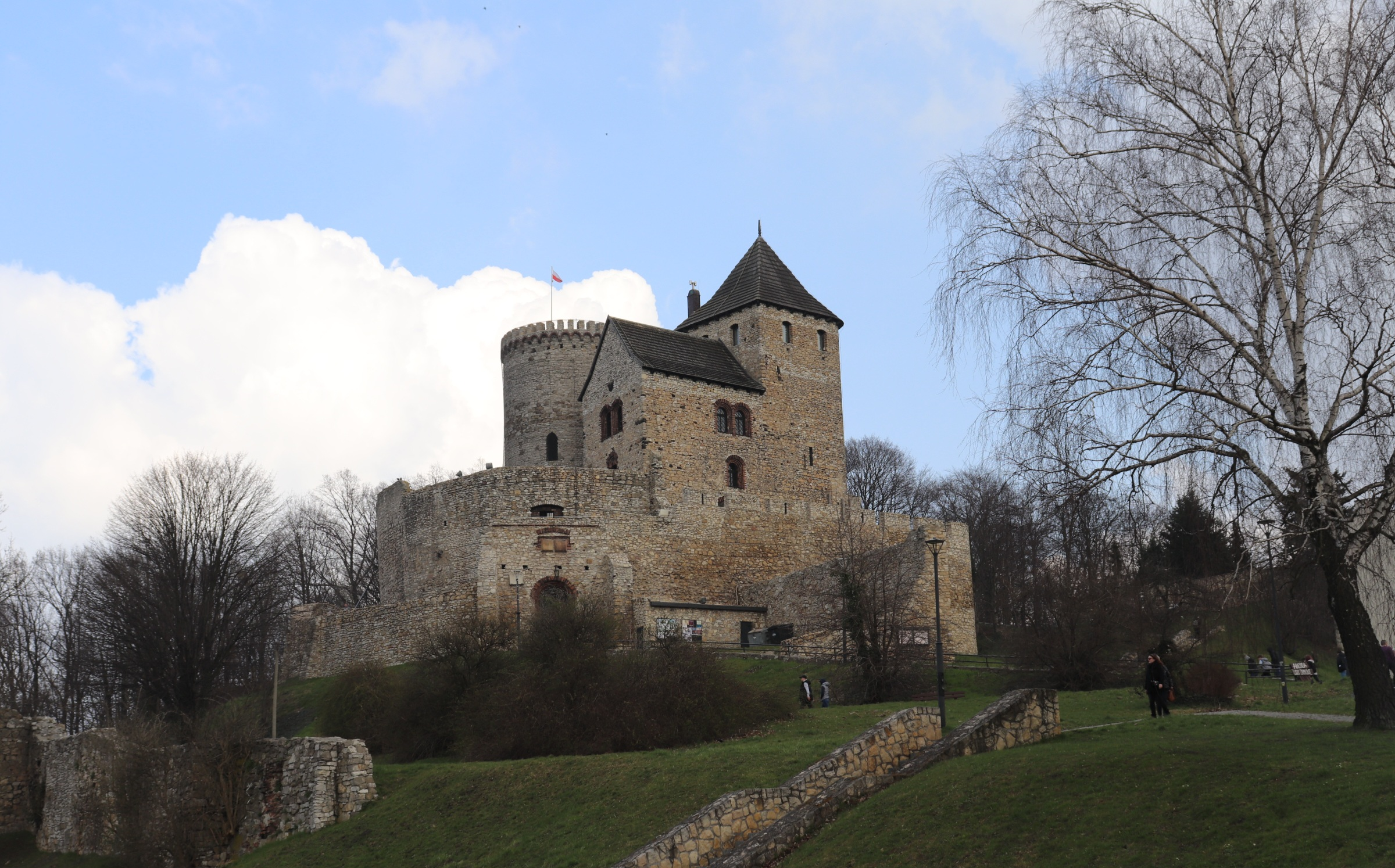
Będzin Castle - 2023

== Museum ==
The castle became the site of a museum, Zagłębie Museum in 1956. The museum has several collections: one of armament, from medieval to World War II times; second dedicated to the history of the Będzin Castle; third to the castles of the other nearby castles founded by Casimir the Great (Eagle Nests Trail or Szlak Orlich Gniazd) and the final one, to the military history of the Będzin region.

== Architecture ==
The castle has two towers, a cylindrical one and a square one. Smaller buildings were attached to the towers. There were three layers of walls, and the castle was connected to the city walls, parts of which survived till today.

== Gallery ==
Będzin Castle by Napoleon Orda, 1881

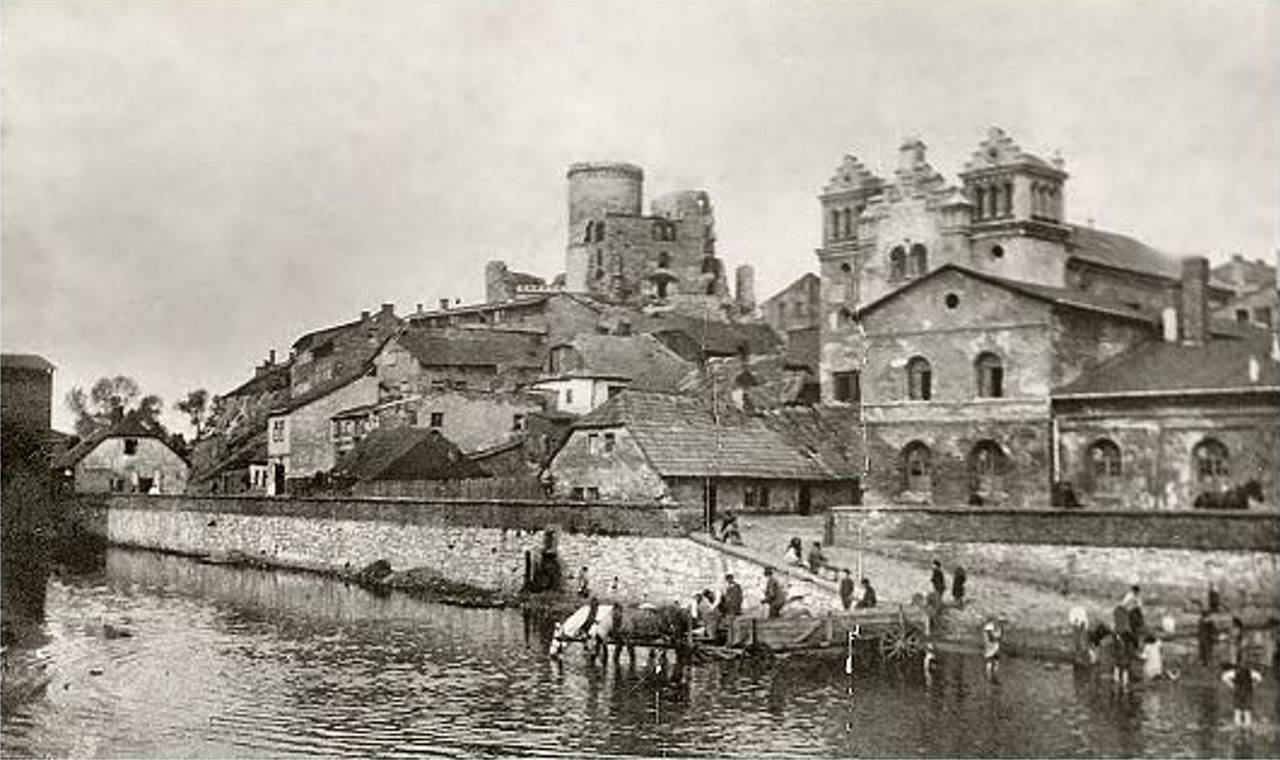
Będzin Castle and a synagogue in the interwar period

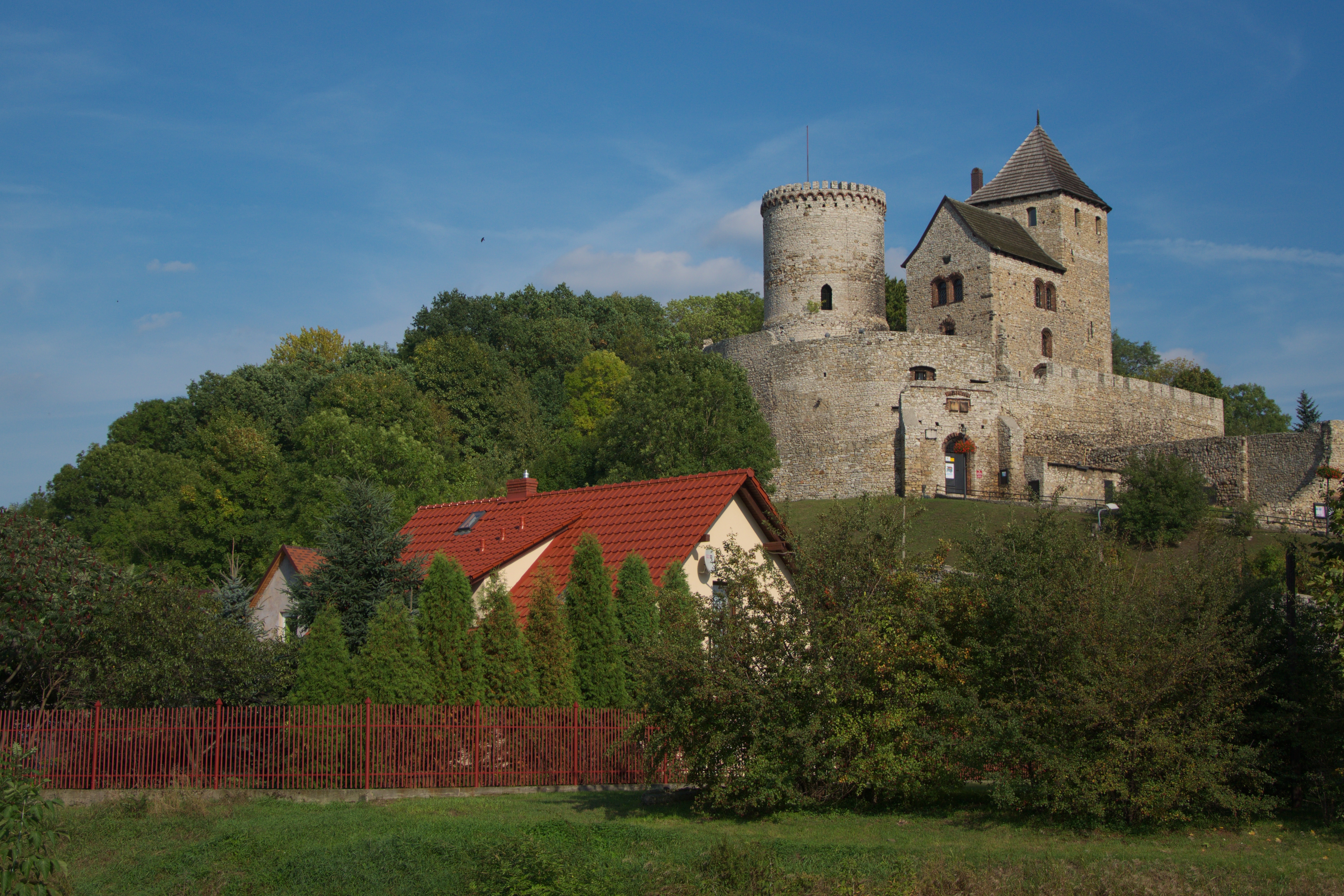
General view of the castle

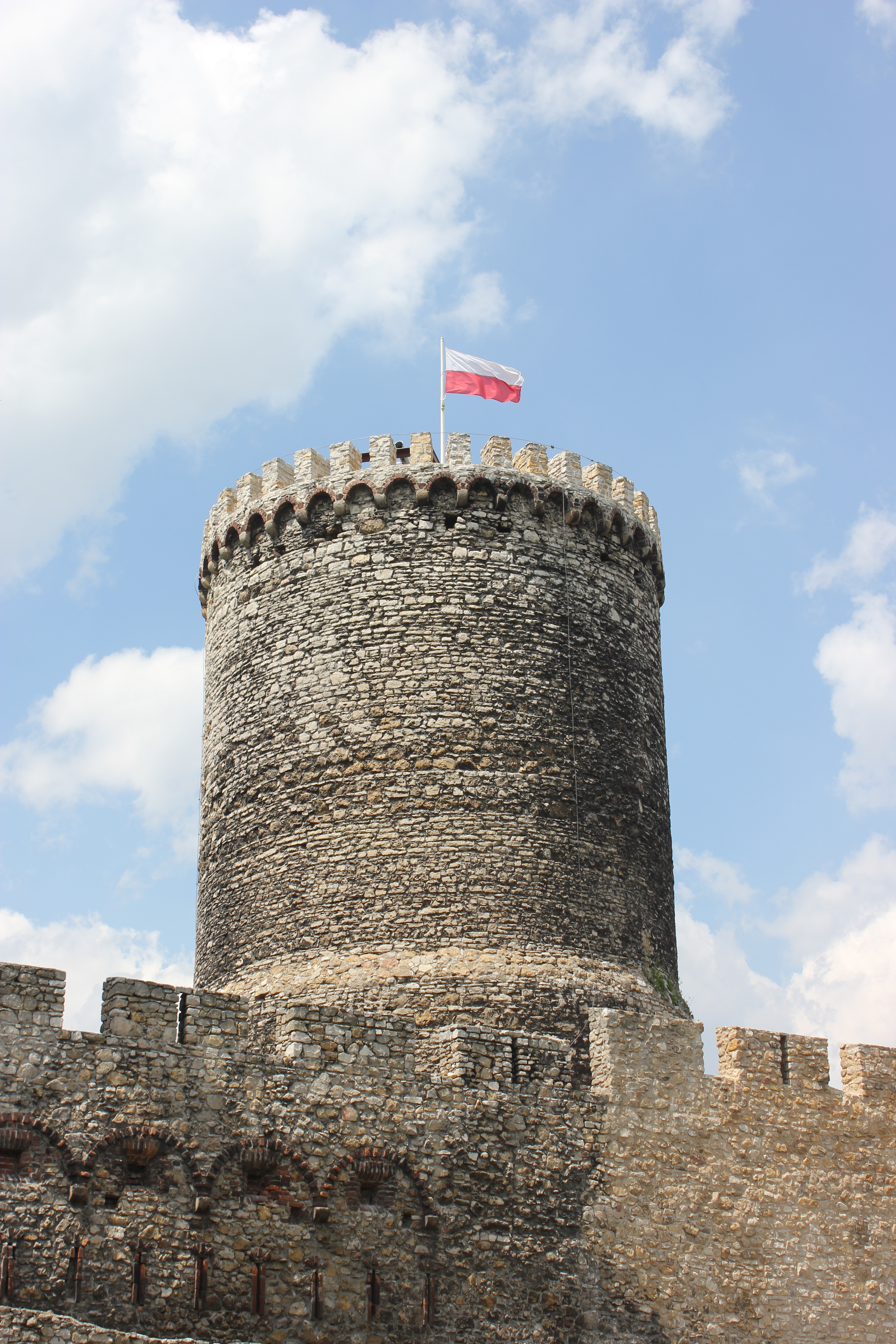
The castle's tower

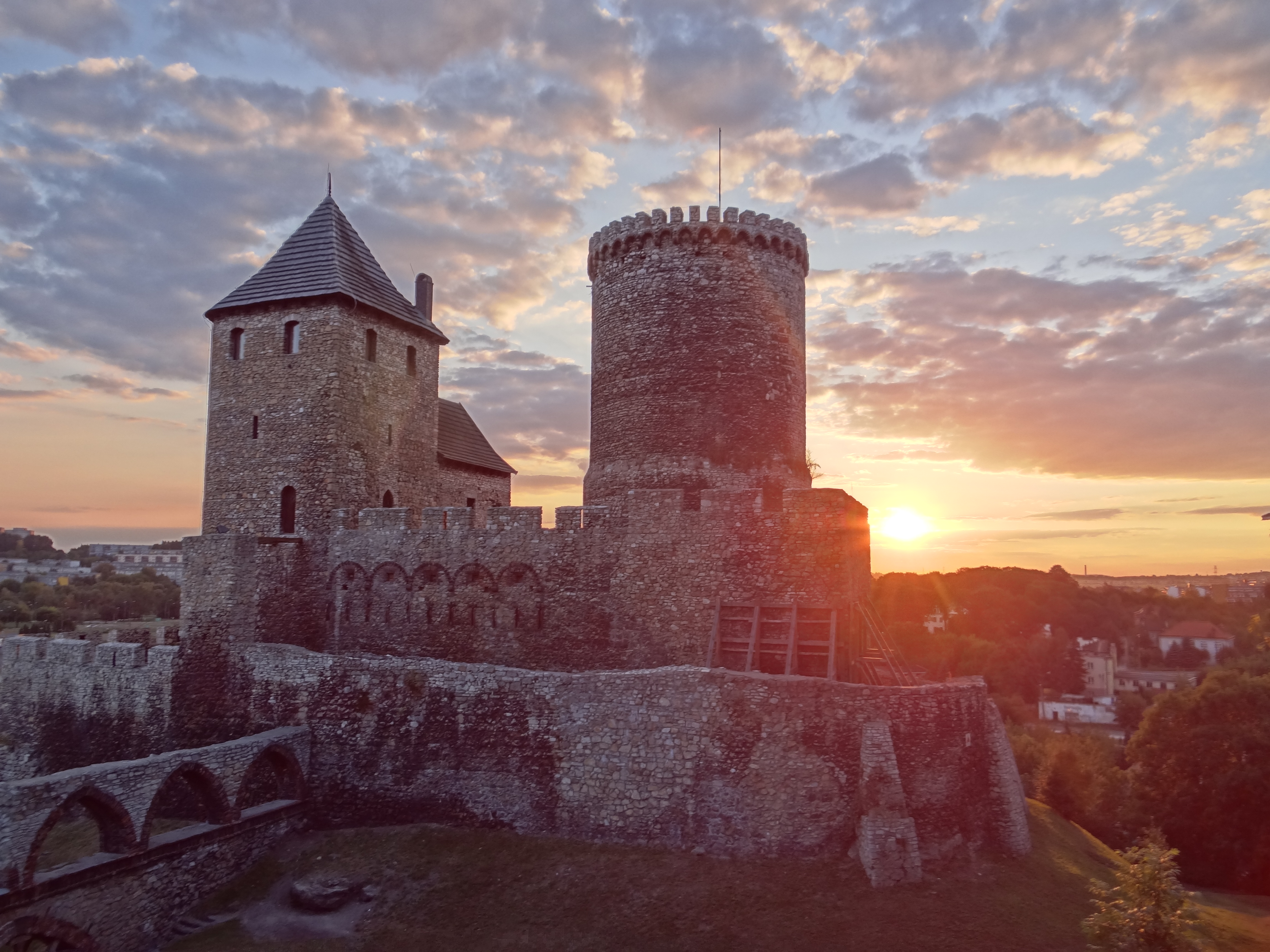
The castle at dusk

== See also ==
- Castles in Poland
- Trail of the Eagle's Nests
