= The Holocaust in East Upper Silesia =

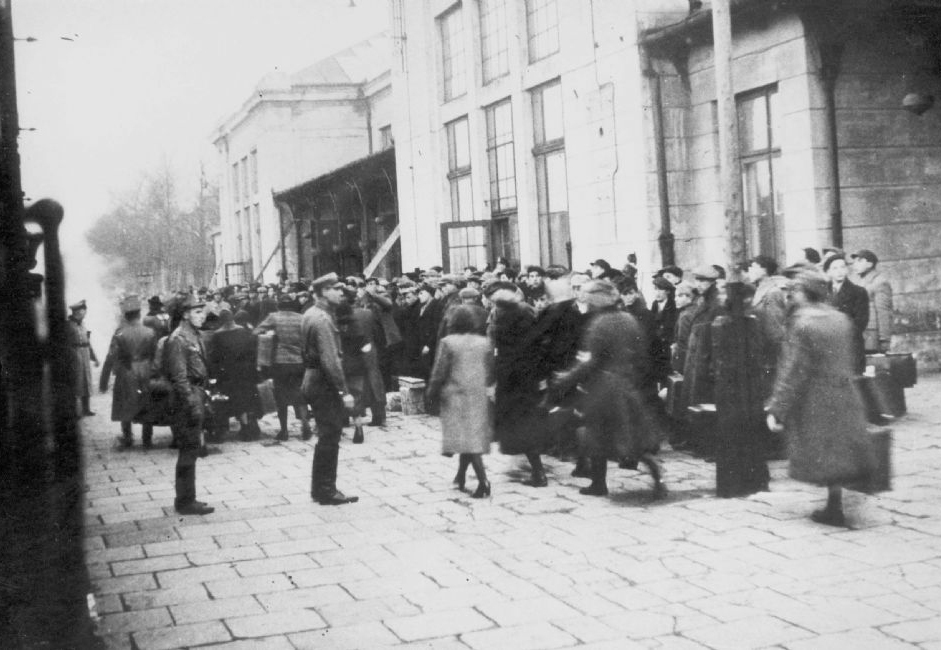
Liquidation of Sosnowiec Ghetto to Auschwitz concentration camp, 1943

The Holocaust resulted in the murder of most of the Jews living in the East Upper Silesia during World War II. It is best known as the site of Auschwitz concentration camp, but it also hosted many of the forced-labor camps of Organization Schmelt and seventeen ghettos, including Sosnowiec Ghetto, Będzin Ghetto, and Dąbrowa Górnicza Ghetto. Part of the region had been in Poland before World War II and other parts in Germany.
