= Chajka Klinger =

Leader of the Jewish Fighting Organization in Będzin Ghetto

- חייקה קלינגר
- Born: September 25, 1917; Będzin, Zagłębie Dąbrowskie, Poland
- Died: April 18, 1958 (aged 40); Israel
- Known for: Leader of Hashomer Hatzair

Chajka Klinger (Hebrew: חייקה קלינגר; September 25, 1917 – April 18, 1958) was the leader of the Jewish Fighting Organization in Będzin Ghetto, interrogated under torture by the Gestapo, escaped and was the first of the ghetto fighters to arrive to Israel.

== Biography ==
Chajka Klinger was born on September 25, 1917, in the city of Będzin in the Zaglebie region of southwestern Poland. She was a member to a poor Hasidic family that barely supported itself through a grocery store run by Chajka's mother, Perla (Schwinkelstein) Klinger. Her father, Leibel, spent his time studying the Torah his whole life. Chajka was accepted into the bilingual Furstenberg Gymnasium in Bedzin. She became fluent in several languages, including: Polish, Yiddish, Hebrew and German. In the 1930, she joined the local branch of Hashomer Hatzair, it was a Zionist-Socialist youth movement, and quickly became the group leader and a member of the local leadership. In 1938, she joined her comrades in Kalisz to train and prepare for immigrating to Palestine.

== Hashomer Hatzair ==
Klinger tried to arrange immigration to Mandatory Palestine in September 1939, but the war changed her plans. Her effort to escape from Poland via Vilna with her boyfriend, Dawid Kozlowski, failed. In the spring of 1940 she was instructed by the Hashomer Hatzair leadership in Vilna to stay in Będzin and restore movement activity there. Klinger and Kozlowski, became the leading figures in the new branch of Hashomer Hatzair in Będzin.

== Condemned to Live ==
On August 1, 1943, at the beginning of the last deportation of the Będzin Jews, Chajka was in an underground bunker, planning to fight. The bunker was uncovered and a handgun was found in her purse. She was taken for interrogation and severely tortured by the Gestapo. She returned to her friends covered in dark bruises from the beatings she had received. The Germans listed her to be sent to Auschwitz. She said, “I will not go to Auschwitz,” and with the help of friends, she successfully fled from detention camp and found a hiding place in the village of Dąbrówka.

At the end of December 1943, Chajka and a few other survivors managed to cross the Slovak border. They were greeted by local underground activists under the leadership of Yaakov Rosenberg, a member of Hashomer Hatzair. Chajka and Yaakov eventually fell in love.

In January 1944, Klinger was smuggled into Hungary and joined the members of her movement in Budapest. When she delivered her report, Chajka's accounts shocked her listeners both in Slovakia and in Hungary. Her comrades rejected her proposals to organize a Jewish revolt. One of them stated ironically, “I don’t want a kibbutz in Israel to be named after me - I want to live in one”.

== Land of Israel ==
In March 1944, using one of the small number of immigration certificates that could be obtained in Hungary, she left legally to Mandatory Palestine. She crossed the Balkans, traveled through Istanbul, Syria and Lebanon, and finally arrived in Haifa.

In 1944, Klinger married Yaakov Rosenberg and the two settled in Kibbutz Haogen. Klinger began to adjust to the kibbutz life, and simultaneously began to prepare for the publication of the diaries that she had written while in hiding in Poland. She never completed this project, and at a certain stage, apparently after the birth of her first child, Zvi, she decided not to continue with her writing. She later gave birth to two more children, Avihu and Arnon.

Her writings were published in forms of journals and collections, and she was not satisfied with the way they edited, simplified and censored the whole story of her past life. In 1958, Chajka no longer had the strength to live more. She took her own life away on the fifteenth anniversary of the Warsaw Ghetto uprising.

== See also ==
- Hashomer Hatzair
- Jewish Fighting Organization

== Notes ==
- Chajka Klinger Jewish Women's Archive
- Avihu Ronen: Condemned to Life: he Diaries and Life of Chajka Klinger. Haifa: Haifa University Publishing, 2011, 630 pp. (Hebrew).
- Judy Batalion: The Light of Days: The Untold Story of Women Resistance Fighters in Hitler’s Ghettos. William Morrow, 2021, ISBN 978-006287421.
