= Frumka Płotnicka =

Polish Jewish resistance fighter (1914–1943)

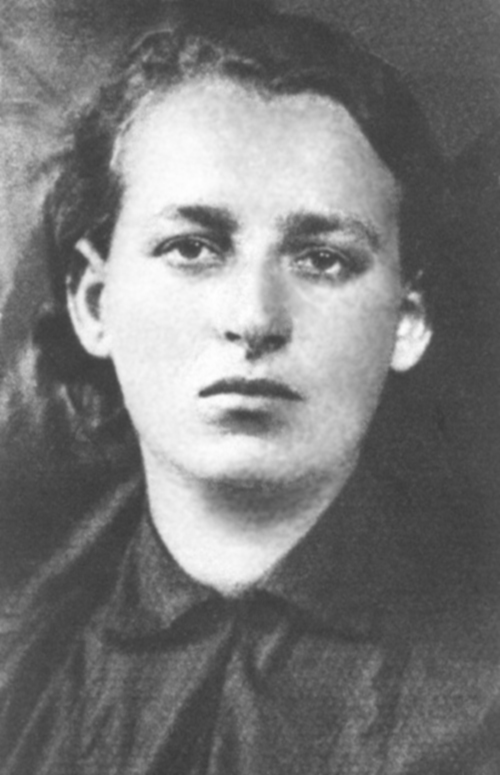
- Płotnicka was a leading member of the Z.O.B. in the Warsaw Ghetto and a leader in the uprising in the Będzin Ghetto during the Holocaust in Poland.
- Born: 1914; Plotnitsa, Russian Empire
- Died: 3 August 1943 (age 29); Będzin Ghetto, Poland
- Cause of death: Killed in action
- Other name: Fruma (Frumke) Plotnitzki (anglicized)
- Organization: Jewish Combat Organization (ŻOB)
- Known for: Będzin Ghetto Uprising leadership
- Awards: Order of the Cross of Grunwald, Poland

Frumka Płotnicka (1914 – 3 August 1943) was a Jewish Polish resistance fighter during World War II; activist of the Jewish Fighting Organization (ŻOB) and member of the Labour Zionist organization Dror. She was one of the organizers of self-defence in the Warsaw Ghetto, and participant in the military preparations for the Warsaw Ghetto Uprising. Following the liquidation of the Ghetto, Płotnicka relocated to the Dąbrowa Basin in southern Poland. On the advice of Mordechai Anielewicz, Płotnicka organized a local chapter of ŻOB in Będzin with the active participation of Józef and Bolesław Kożuch as well as Cwi (Tzvi) Brandes, and soon thereafter witnessed the murderous liquidation of both Sosnowiec and Będzin Ghettos by the German authorities.

During the final deportation action of early August 1943, the Jewish Combat Organization in Będzin staged an uprising against the Germans (as in nearby Sosnowiec). The Będzin-Sosnowiec ghetto uprising lasted for several days even though the SS broke through the main line of defence within hours. Płotnicka died on 3 August 1943 in one of the Będzin bunkers, fighting against the Germans. Posthumously, she received the Order of the Cross of Grunwald from the Polish Committee of National Liberation in April 1945.

== Life ==
Płotnicka was born in Plotnitsa, a village near Pińsk, during World War I, part of the newly reborn Poland since 1919 after a century of foreign Partitions. She relocated to Warsaw in 1938 to assume a position at the headquarters of the Dror Zionist Youth Movement founded on Polish lands in 1915 in the course of the war with imperial Russia.

Following the 1939 invasion of Poland by Nazi Germany and the Soviet Union, Płotnicka undertook underground activities as leader of the HeHalutz youth movement. Using false identities and facial disguise, she travelled across General Government territory between Jewish ghettos in German-occupied Poland. She witnessed the Holocaust trains departing from train stations to undisclosed death camps during the extermination of the Jews known as the "Final Solution". As a courier ('kashariyot'), she delivered light weapons procured by the Warsaw Ghetto underground, as well as blueprints, drafted by the headquarters, for the manufacture of Molotov cocktails and hand grenades. Among the Jewish communities she visited, Płotnicka was referred to as "Die Mameh", Yiddish for "Mom". She relayed the reports of murderous liquidation of so many ghettos that she began to call herself a "gravedigger".

Jews would flock around her from all sides. One would ask her if he should return home [in the German zone of occupation], or continue his way eastward to the Soviet-dominated provinces. Another would come in search of a hot meal or a loaf of bread for his wife and children. They called her 'Die Mameh' and indeed she was a devoted mother to them all. — Zivia Lubetkin

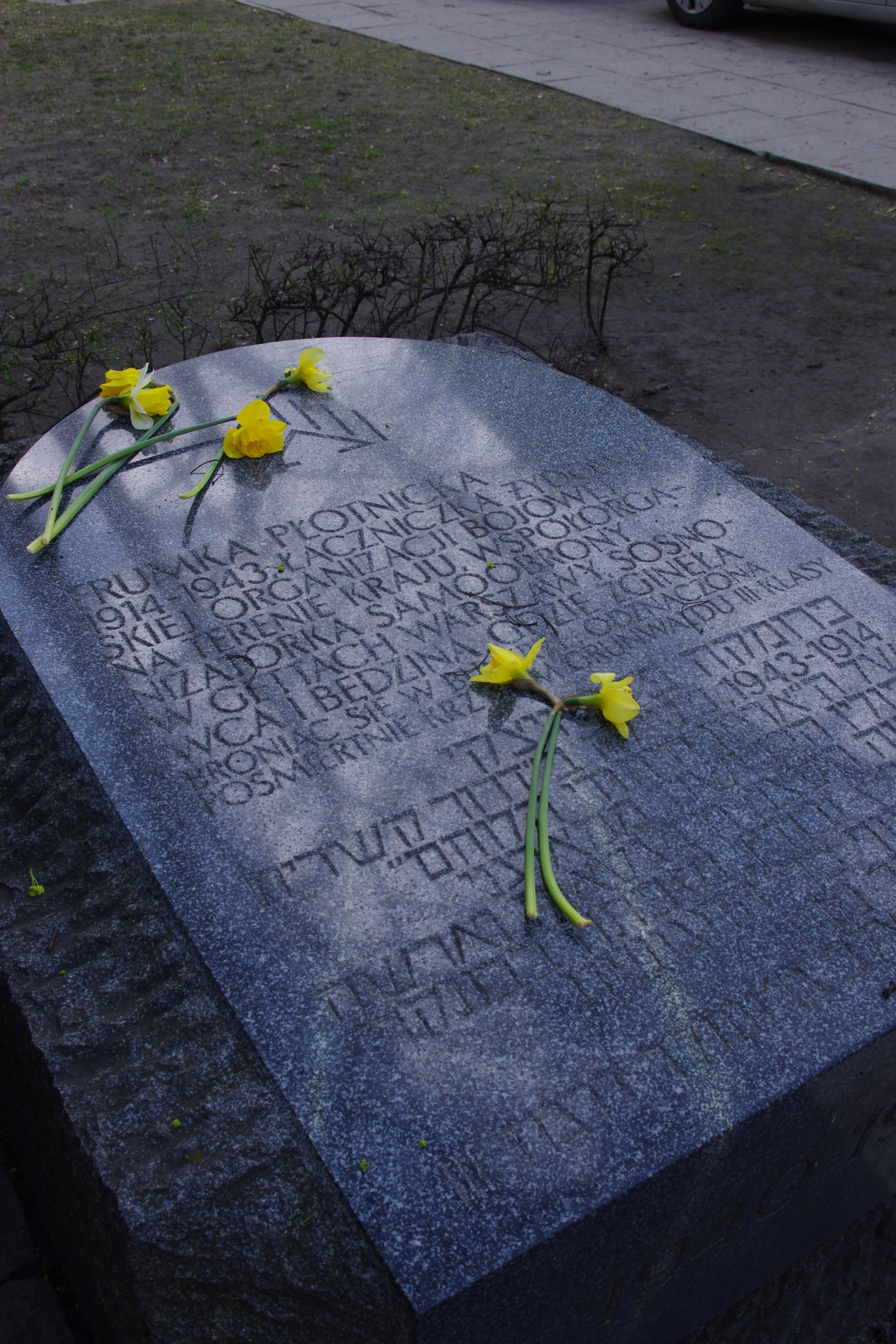
Syenite block located at the intersection of Niska and Dubois streets in Warsaw commemorating the life and martyrdom of Frumka Płotnicka

After the Großaktion Warschau in September 1942 Płotnicka was sent from Warsaw to Będzin in occupied south-western Poland by the Jewish Combat Organization (ŻOB) in order to help the self-defence organization there. The seeds of ŻOB were planted in the Warsaw Ghetto only two months earlier, when the German SS headed by Hermann Höfle began the roundups of Jews aimed at deporting 254,000 prisoners to the newly built Treblinka extermination camp. Płotnicka was the first Jewish courier in the Warsaw Ghetto to smuggle weapons from the Aryan part of the city inside sacks of potatoes.

Płotnicka was issued a Paraguayan passport issued by the Ładoś Group.

=== Będzin Ghetto Uprising ===
In the Będzin Ghetto, the Jewish underground cell was formed in 1941. The ghetto was never surrounded by a wall, even though it was tightly guarded by the German and the Jewish Ghetto Police. In March 1941 there were 25,171 Jews in Będzin; this increased to 27,000 after the ominous expulsion of the Jewish community of Oświęcim, the location of the Auschwitz II Birkenau redevelopment. In May 1942 deportations to Auschwitz began with the first transport of 3,200 Będzin Jews loaded onto Holocaust trains at the Umschlagplatz. On the advice of Mordechai Anielewicz who stayed in Dąbrowa Basin temporarily in mid-1942, Płotnicka, Brandes and the Kożuch brothers, organized a local chapter of ŻOB. On 3 August 1943, during the final deportation action, the partisans launched an uprising which lasted for several days. Płotnicka was killed in a bunker at Podsiadły Street on the same day. (Note: On 22 June 1943 Zivia Lubetkin and Yitzhak Zuckerman from Warsaw sent a message to the Polish government-in-exile in London about the ghetto extermination action in Będzin where Frumka Płotnicka and Dawid Kozłowski were the contact persons. The Polish leadership instructed the Home Army (AK) to provide more weapons for them, in a message of 27 July 1943. The message from Britain to Stanisław Jankowski from Cichociemni was deciphered in Warsaw one week later. Płotnicka was killed a day earlier, on 3 August 1943.)

The engraved Syenite commemorative plaque, located at the intersection of Niska and Dubois Streets in Warsaw, is dedicated to her memory. The memorial stone is part of an innercity Memory Trail of the Struggle and Martyrdom of the Jews (pl), inaugurated in 1988, extending from the intersection of Zamenhof and Anielewicz streets to the intersection of Dzika and Stawki Streets. Płotnicka was registered by Yad Vashem as a victim of the Holocaust in 1957.

== Awards ==
- Order of the Cross of Grunwald from the Polish Committee of National Liberation on 19 April 1945.

== See also ==
- Bela Yaari Hazan
