= Sosnowiec Ghetto =

Nazi ghetto in occupied Poland

The Sosnowiec Ghetto
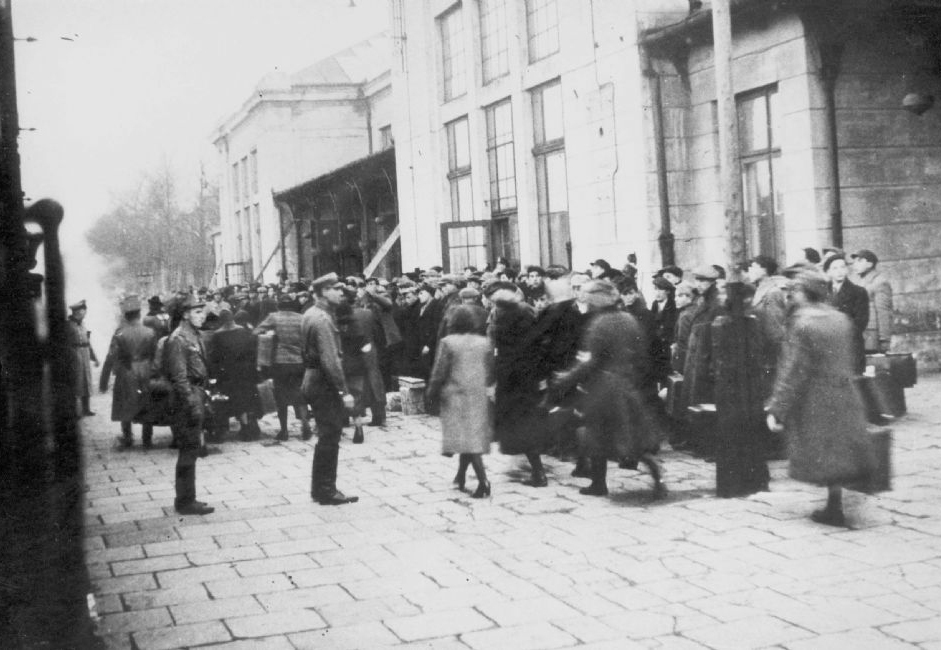
- Deportation of Jews from the Sosnowiec Ghetto

- Sosnowiec location north of Auschwitz during the Holocaust in Poland

- Location of Sosnowiec in Poland today
- Location: Sosnowiec, German-occupied Poland; 50°17′50″N 19°09′25″E
- Incident type: Imprisonment, forced labor, starvation, transit to extermination camps
- Organizations: Schutzstaffel (SS)
- Camp: Auschwitz
- Victims: 35,000 Polish Jews

The Sosnowiec Ghetto (German: Ghetto von Sosnowitz) was a World War II ghetto set up by Nazi German authorities for Polish Jews in the Środula district of Sosnowiec in the Province of Upper Silesia. During the Holocaust in occupied Poland, most inmates, estimated at over 35,000 Jewish men, women and children were deported to Auschwitz death camp aboard Holocaust trains following roundups lasting from June until August 1943. The ghetto was liquidated during an uprising, a final act of defiance of its Underground Jewish Combat Organization (ŻOB) made up of youth. Most of the Jewish fighters perished.

The Sosnowiec Ghetto formed a single administrative unit with the Będzin Ghetto, because both cities are a part of the same metropolitan area in the Dąbrowa Basin. Prior to deportations, the Jews from the two ghettos shared the "Farma" vegetable garden allocated to Zionist youth by the Judenrat.

== History ==
Before the war, there were about 30,000 Jews in Sosnowiec, making up about 20% of the town's population. Over the next two years the Germans resettled thousands of Jews from smaller towns to Sosnowiec, temporarily increasing the size of the local Jewish community to 45,000. By late 1942, Będzin and nearby Sosnowiec (which bordered Będzin), became the only two cities in the Zagłębie Dąbrowskie region that were still inhabited by Jews.

The city, located on the pre-war Polish-German border, was taken over by the Germans on the first day of the invasion of Poland. Arrests and beatings among more prominent Jews began the next morning. On 9 September 1939 the Great Synagogue in Sosnowiec was burned. Local Jews were being evicted from better homes and terrorized on the streets. Jewish businesses were plundered by individual soldiers and closed by the Nazis pending confiscation proceedings. Shootings and first mass executions followed soon afterwards. Forced relocations into crowded tenements slowly created a ghetto.

Judenrat and the Jewish Ghetto Police were soon established on German orders; the head of the Sosnowiec Judenrat was Moshe Merin (Mojżesz Merin in Polish). Food rationing was introduced. The Jews were prohibited from buying anything outside their own community. In the first months of 1940 the Zentrale der Jüdischen Ältestenräte in Oberschlesien (Central Office of the Jewish Councils of Elders in Upper Silesia), headed by Merin, was created in Sosnowiec, representing about 45 communities. For a time, Merin became infamous as the dictator of the Jews of the Zaglebie region, with the power of life and death over local Jews. A labour camp was established for the Jews deported to Sosnowiec from Czechoslovakia to work at the factory of the Shine brothers. Numerous forced labour facilities were established for the locals; making uniforms, underwear, corsets, bags, leather handbags, and military boots. In 1940 some 2,592 German war profiteers arrived in the city. By 1942, their number rose to 10,749 settlers, constituting 10% of the general population.

Ever since the ghetto was established, numerous deportation actions were organized by the Germans with the help of the Judenrat and Merin, selecting healthy men for slave labor at the camps. Large transfers of Jews took part in May (1,500) and June 1942 (2,000). Around October 1942 - January 1943 the ghetto was moved to the Środula district. Środula also bordered the site of the Będzin Ghetto. At this point about 13,000 Jews still lived in Sosnowiec. The creation of the Sosnowiec ghetto ended on 10 March 1943, when it was finally closed off from the outside world.

Thousands of Jews were deported from Sosnowiec to Auschwitz in June 1943 during the major deportation action extending to nearby Będzin. The ghetto was liquidated two months later in August, whereas almost all remaining Jews were also deported to Auschwitz. A few hundred Jews remained in the Środula ghetto, which was liquidated in January 1944.

=== The uprising ===
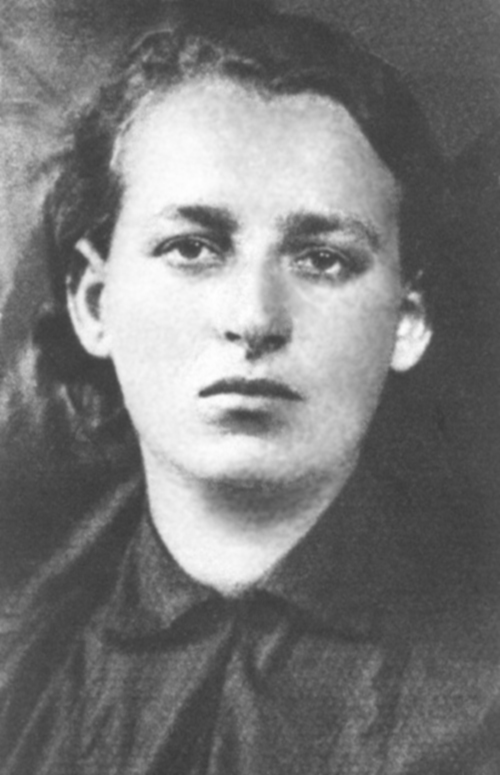
Frumka Płotnicka, age 29, led the uprising in the Będzin Ghetto adjacent to Sosnowiec

There had been considerable underground activity among the Jews in Sosnowiec and Będzin Ghetto nearby, organized by the youth organizations Ha-No'ar ha-Ziyyoni, Gordonia, and Ha-Shomer ha-Za'ir. During the final major deportation push in August 1943, the Jewish Combat Organization (Polish: Żydowska Organizacja Bojowa, ŻOB) in Będzin and Sosnowiec staged an uprising against the Germans. The uprising, which began on 3 August 1943, was led by Cwi (Tzvi) Brandes, Frumka Płotnicka, and the Kożuch brothers. It was the final act of defiance of the local population with no chance of success. Most of the young Jewish fighters perished (400 killed in action), fighting the overwhelming German forces. The last Holocaust transport to Auschwitz-Birkenau with Jews forced to bury the dead, left Sosnowiec on 15 January 1944.

Resistance of the ghetto inhabitants is commemorated by one of the streets in Sosnowiec, bearing the name "Street of the Ghetto Heroes" (Ul. Bohaterów Getta). There is also Kożuch Brothers square (Plac Braci Kożuchów) with a ghetto memorial.

== Holocaust rescue ==
The Catholic convent of Carmelite Nuns led by Mother Teresa Kierocińska aided the Jews in the ghetto and hiding. Kierocińska was awarded a medal of the Righteous 46 years after her death. She was declared "heroic in virtue" by Pope Francis in 2013. The Carmelite Sisters run an orphanage at the monastery. They delivered free bread to Jews in hiding, send food parcels to Auschwitz, and rescued Jewish children by hiding them under false names among the Christian orphans. The convent was frequently inspected by the Gestapo on suspicion of illegal activities.

During the ghetto liquidation, Danuta Szwarcbaum-Bachmajer escaped with her new baby and was rescued by the Chawiński couple. Szloma Szpringer (Springer) with his 5-year-old son Wolf was rescued by Pelagia Huczak, another recipient of the Righteous Among the Nations award. Adela Zawadzka with her 3-year-old child and her sister Rozia Zawadzka escaped from the 1943 deportation and were rescued by Józefa Hankus and her sister Rozalia Porębska who got them false papers from the Polish underground; Rozia used her false Kennkarte to get her fiancé Elek Jakubowicz out of the camp, helped by Johan Brys, a railway man. Rozalia Porębska sheltered them both, and helped many other Jews from Sosnowiec as well. Porębska family and friend, a total of seven individuals, received the Righteous award in 1982. Mosze Kokotek whose wife Brandla was killed by the Germans, escaped from the ghetto with his 9-year-old daughter Felicja and stayed with the Poles on the Aryan side until 1944. They left the city together after Sosnowiec became Judenfrei. Little Felicja was taken in by Leokadia Statnik (Pessel) in Ochojec near Katowice. Mosze left them there and perished, but his daughter grew up in the care of Leokadia, and in 1957 immigrated to Israel. Another child, Zofia Goldman, rescued by Maria Suszczewicz, was claimed back by her father Henryk who survived, and went with him to Australia.

Six Jews were sheltered for two years from 1943 until the arrival of the Soviets in 1945 by Maria Sitko and her daughter Wanda Sitko-Gelbhart, including Fela Kac and her aunt Fryda, Heniek Mandelbaum, Jerzy Feder, as well as Felicja and Leon Weintraub. They shared a tiny apartment consisting of one room with a kitchen and a vestibule with the door into the corridor. Fryda with Fela escaped from the Holocaust train. During police searches, the Jews used to descend into two dugouts constructed by the men under the floors, so the Sitko women could pretend that they did not harbor fugitives, which carried the death penalty in those days. Wanda Sitko stole an identity card while visiting the police station, and gave it to Jerzy Feder which allowed him to go outside with her to obtain the necessities of life on the Aryan side of the city. All Jews survived the Holocaust. Thirty years later in 1986 – after her mother's death – Wanda Sitko-Gelbhart received a letter from the survivors which stated: "You and your mother at the risk of your life did things impossible and great, all this disinterestedly, acting only from the heart, which at that time was truly heroic.

== See also ==
- List of Jewish ghettos in German-occupied Poland
