= Będzin Ghetto =

Nazi ghetto in occupied Poland

The Będzin Ghetto
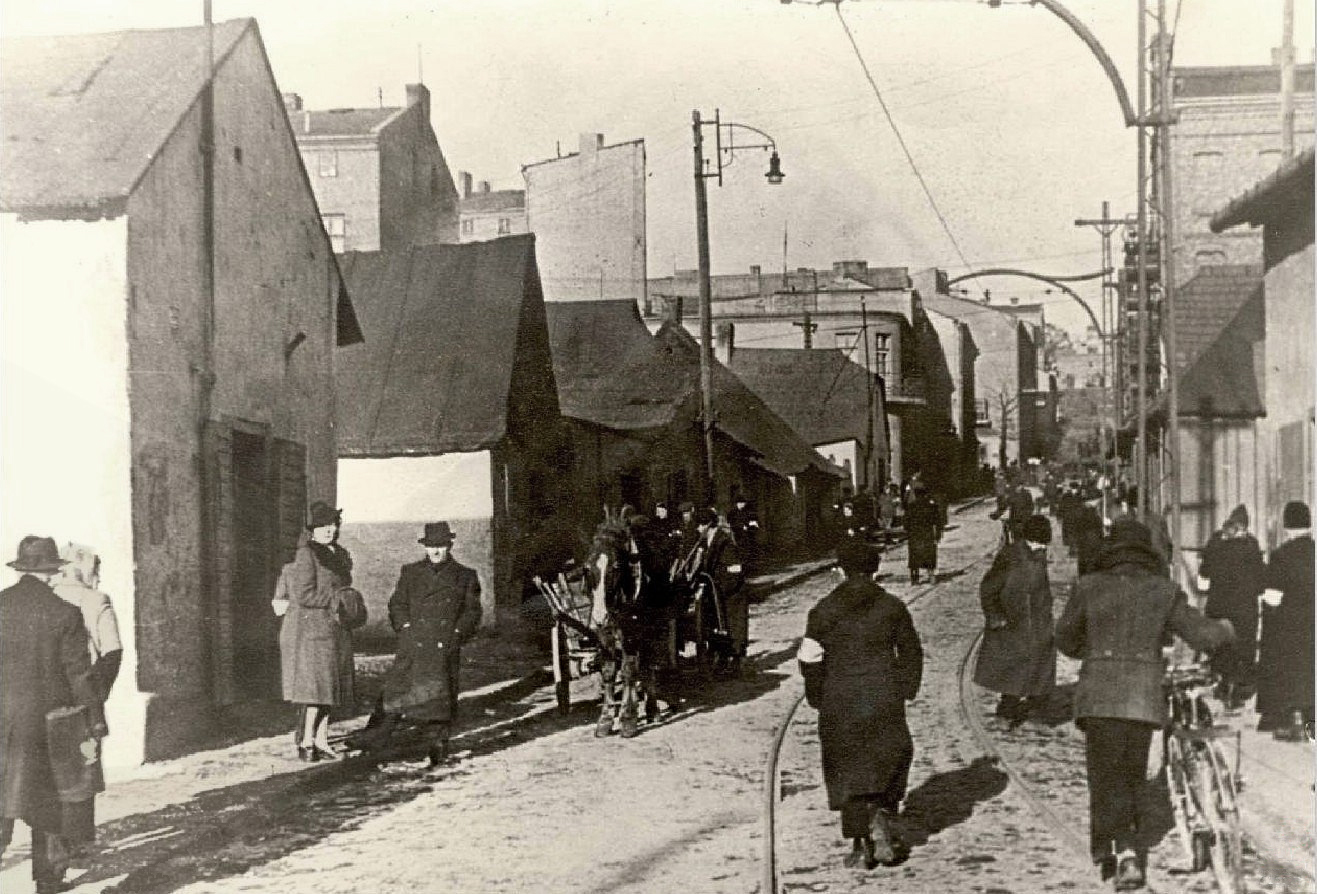
- Będzin Ghetto in the Holocaust, Modrzejowska Street, 1942

- Będzin location during the Holocaust in Poland
- Location: Będzin, German-occupied Poland
- Incident type: Imprisonment, forced labor, starvation
- Organizations: SS
- Camp: Auschwitz concentration camp
- Victims: 30,000 Polish Jews

The Będzin Ghetto (a.k.a. the Bendzin Ghetto, Yiddish: בענדינער געטאָ, romanized: Bendiner geto; German: Ghetto von Bendsburg) was a Jewish ghetto established by Nazi Germany for Polish Jews in the town of Będzin in occupied southwestern Poland. The German authorities announced the formation of this ghetto in July 1940. Over 20,000 local Jews from Będzin, along with an additional 10,000 Jews expelled from neighbouring communities, were forced to subsist there until the end of the ghetto history during the Holocaust. Most of the able-bodied poor were forced to work in German military factories before being transported aboard Holocaust trains to the nearby Auschwitz concentration camp, where they were exterminated. The last major deportation of the ghetto inmates by the Nazi Schutzstaffel ("SS") – men, women and children – between 1 and 3 August 1943 was marked by a ghetto uprising by members of the Jewish Combat Organization.

The Będzin Ghetto formed a single administrative unit with the Sosnowiec Ghetto in the bordering Środula district of Sosnowiec, because both cities are a part of the same urban area in the Dąbrowa Basin. The Jews from both ghettos shared the "Farma" vegetable garden allocated to Zionist youth by the Judenrat.

Fridrich Kuczynski, a member of the Organization Schmelt, was sentenced to death after the war for the deaths of 100,000 Jewish victims.

== Background ==
Before the 1939 invasion of Poland at the onset of World War II, Będzin had a vibrant Jewish community. According to the Polish census of 1921, the town's Jewish population consisted of 17,298 people, or 62.1 percent of its total population. By 1938, the number of Jews had increased to about 22,500.

During the Nazi-Soviet invasion of Poland, the German military overran the area in early September 1939. The army was followed by mobile death squads of the Einsatzgruppen, and the persecution of the Jews began immediately. On 7 September the first draconian economic sanctions were imposed. A day later, on 8 September, the Będzin Synagogue was burned. On 9 September 1939 the first mass murder of local Jews took place with 40 prominent individuals executed.

A month later, on 8 October 1939, Hitler declared that Będzin would become part of the Polish territories annexed by Germany. The Order Police battalions began to deport Jewish families from all neighbouring communities of the Zagłębie Dąbrowskie region into Będzin. Among them were the Jews of Bohumín, Kielce and Oświęcim (Auschwitz). Overall, about 30,000 Jews would live in Będzin during World War II. By late 1942, Będzin and the nearby Sosnowiec bordering Będzin (see Sosnowiec Ghetto), became the only two cities in the Zagłębie Dąbrowskie region that were inhabited by the Jews.

== The ghetto ==
From October 1940 to May 1942, about 4,000 Jewish people were deported from Będzin to serve as slave labour in the rapidly growing number of camps. Until October 1942 the internal boundaries of the ghetto remained unmarked. No fence was built. The area was defined by the neighbourhoods of Kamionka and Mała Środula bordering the Sosnowiec Ghetto, with the Jewish police placed by the SS along the perimeter. As was the case in other ghettoes across occupied Poland, German authorities exterminated most of the Jews of Będzin during the murderous Operation Reinhard, deporting them to Nazi death camps, primarily to nearby Auschwitz-Birkenau for gassing. During this time, the leaders of the Jewish community in Zagłebie, including Moshe Merin (Mojżesz Merin, in Polish), cooperated with the Germans in the hope that the survival of the Jews might be tied to their forced labour exploitation. It was a false assumption.

Major deportation actions, commanded by SS-Standartenführer Alexander von Woedtke, took place in 1942 with 2,000 Jews sent to be murdered in Auschwitz in May and 5,000 in August. Another 5,000 Jews from the ghettoes were deported from Będzin aboard Holocaust trains between August 1942 and June 1943. The last major deportations took place in 1943 when 5,000 Jews were removed on 22 June 1943 and 8,000 around 1–3 August 1943. About 1,000 remaining Jews were deported in the subsequent months. It is estimated that, of the 30,000 inhabitants of the ghetto, only 2,000 survivors remained.

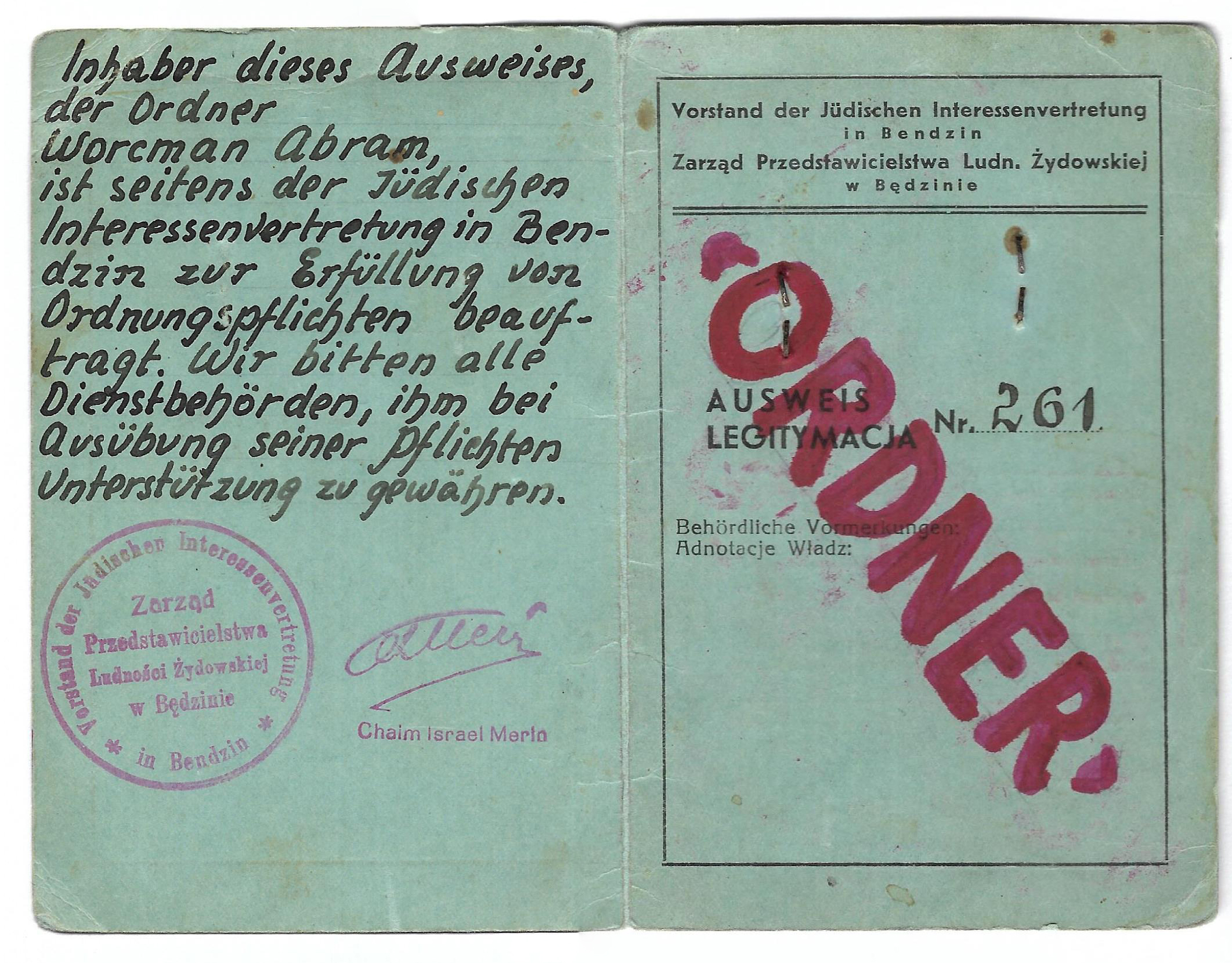
1941 Będzin Ghetto Police ID.

== Uprising ==
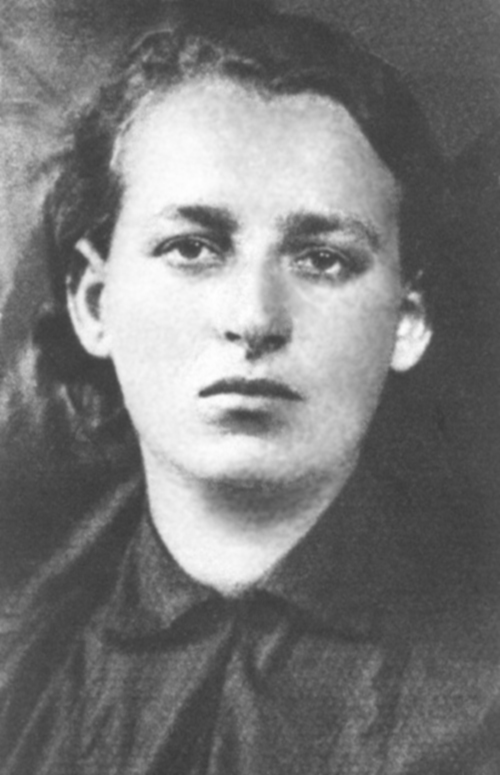
Frumka Płotnicka who fought in the Warsaw Ghetto Uprising at age 29, led the uprising in the Będzin Ghetto during Operation Reinhard

During the final deportation action of early August 1943, the Jewish Combat Organization (ŻOB) in Będzin staged an uprising against the Germans (as in nearby Sosnowiec). Already in 1941 a local chapter of ŻOB was created in Będzin, on the advice of Mordechai Anielewicz. Weapons were obtained from the Jewish underground in Warsaw. Pistols and hand-grenades were smuggled in perilous train rides. Edzia Pejsachson was caught and tortured to death. Using patterns supplied by the headquarters the Molotov cocktails were being manufactured. The bombs that the Jews produced – according to surviving testimonies – were comparable with those of the Nazis. Several bunkers were dug out within the ghetto boundary to produce and hide these weapons. The attitude of the Judenrat in Będzin to the resistance was negative from the start, but it changed during the ghetto liquidation.

The revolt was an ultimate act of defiance of the ghetto insurgents who fought in the neighbourhoods of Kamionka and Środula. A group of partisans barricaded themselves in the bunker at Podsiadły Street (today's address 24 Rutki Laskier street) along with their female leader, Frumka Płotnicka, age 29, who fought in the Warsaw Ghetto Uprising several weeks earlier. All of them were killed by the German forces once they ran out of bullets, but the fighting, which began on 3 August 1943, lasted for several days. Most of the remaining Jews perished soon thereafter, when the ghetto was liquidated, although the deportations had to be extended from a few days to two weeks and the SS from Auschwitz (45 km distance) was summoned to assist. Posthumously, Frumka Płotnicka received the Order of the Cross of Grunwald from the Polish Committee of National Liberation on 19 April 1945.

== Rescue attempts ==
Efforts by Christians to rescue Jews from Nazi persecution began immediately during the German invasion. When on 8 September 1939 the Synagogue was set on fire by the SS with a crowd of Jewish worshippers inside, the Catholic priest, Father Mieczysław Zawadzki (pl), opened the gates of his church at Góra Zamkowa for all runaways seeking refuge. It is not known how many Jews he saved inside until the danger subsided; likely more than one hundred. Father Zawadzki was awarded the title of the Polish Righteous Among the Nations posthumously in 2007. He died in 1975 in Będzin.

While the Synagogue burned, other houses also caught fire. Many escaping Jews saved by Father Zawadzki were also wounded and required medical help. They were rescued by Dr. Tadeusz Kosibowicz, director of the state hospital in Będzin, aided by Dr. Ryszard Nyc and Sister Rufina Świrska. The critically injured Jews were taken by them to the hospital under false names. Other Jews hid at the hospital also by being given instant employment. However, Director Kosibowicz was denounced by one of his ethnic German patients and arrested by the Gestapo on 8 May 1940. All three rescuers were sentenced to death, soon commuted to camp imprisonment. Dr Kosibowicz was in KZ Dachau, KL Sachsenhausen, in Majdanek (KL Lublin) as well as in KL Gross-Rosen. He worked as prisoner medic and survived. Kosibowicz returned to Będzin after liberation and resumed his position as the hospital director. He died on 6 July 1971. He was awarded the title of Righteous posthumously in 2006 by the State of Israel.

Hundreds of Polish Jews remained in hiding when the Auschwitz deportations ended in August 1943. The survivors were smuggled out of the bunkers in small groups by ŻOB members: Fela Kac, Schmuel Ron and Kasia Szancer. Polish rescuers who picked them up on the 'Aryan' side of the city included Roman Kołodziej, killed for saving Jews on 2 January 1944, and Zofia Klemens arrested by Gestapo and sent to a concentration camp; Klemens survived. She was awarded the title of the Righteous in 1964. The Kobylec family rescued over seventy Jews; they received Righteous medals twenty years later.

Escape attempts took place during the ghetto liquidation actions. Cela Kleinmann and her brother Icchak escaped from a Holocaust train in 1943 thanks to a loose plank in the roof. They were rescued by the family of Stanisław Grzybowski, with whom their father had worked in a coal mine. However, Cela was caught while looking for "Aryan" ID papers and murdered. After that, Grzybowski brought Icchak to his own daughter Wanda and her husband Kazimierz in 1944. Wanda and Kazimierz Kafarski were awarded recognition as Righteous in 2004, long after Stanisław Grzybowski died of old age.

== Commemoration ==
There are several diaries from survivors and hundreds of written items of correspondence made to relations from those in the ghetto at the time. Photos of many of the ghetto's deportees to Auschwitz were preserved. A collection of over 2,000 photographs was discovered in October, 1986, including many images of life in Będzin and the ghetto. Some of them have been published in a book or in a video. The Eyes from the Ashes Foundation administers the collection.

In 2004, Będzin City Council decided to dedicate the city square to the heroes of the Jewish ghetto uprising in Będzin. In August 2005 new memorial was unveiled at the site of the Będzin Ghetto.

In July 2024 Cukerman Gate Foundation purchased from private owners the property at 24 Rutki Laskier street where the main bunker was located. Under the banner of the Ghetto Fighters' House, they began work to adapt it to serve as an educational and museum facility. In addition, in May 2025 archaeological excavations at the property began.

== People of the Będzin Ghetto ==
Ghetto Partisans:

- Zvi Brandes (1917-1943), Hashomer Hatzair, commander Jewish Fighting Organization (ZOB)
- Baruch Gaftek (1913-1943), Dror – Halutz Underground, commander Jewish resistance
- Chajka Klinger (1917-1958), Hashomer Hatzair
- Shlomo Lerner (d. 1943), founder Halutz underground Zaglembia, commander Jewish Fighteing Organizations, ZOB
- David Liver, ghetto underground
- Frumka Plotnitzka (1914-1943), leader underground resistance
- E zriel ("Yozek") Koszok, leader underground resistance
- Mordecai Anielewicz, Jewish Fighting Organization (ZOB), Bedzin, Warsaw
- Marcus Pohorila (1912-1943)
- Herschel Springer, leader, underground
- Rebecca Granz (1915-1943), also Czenstochow and Warsaw Ghetto
- Israel Kozhuch (1922-1943)

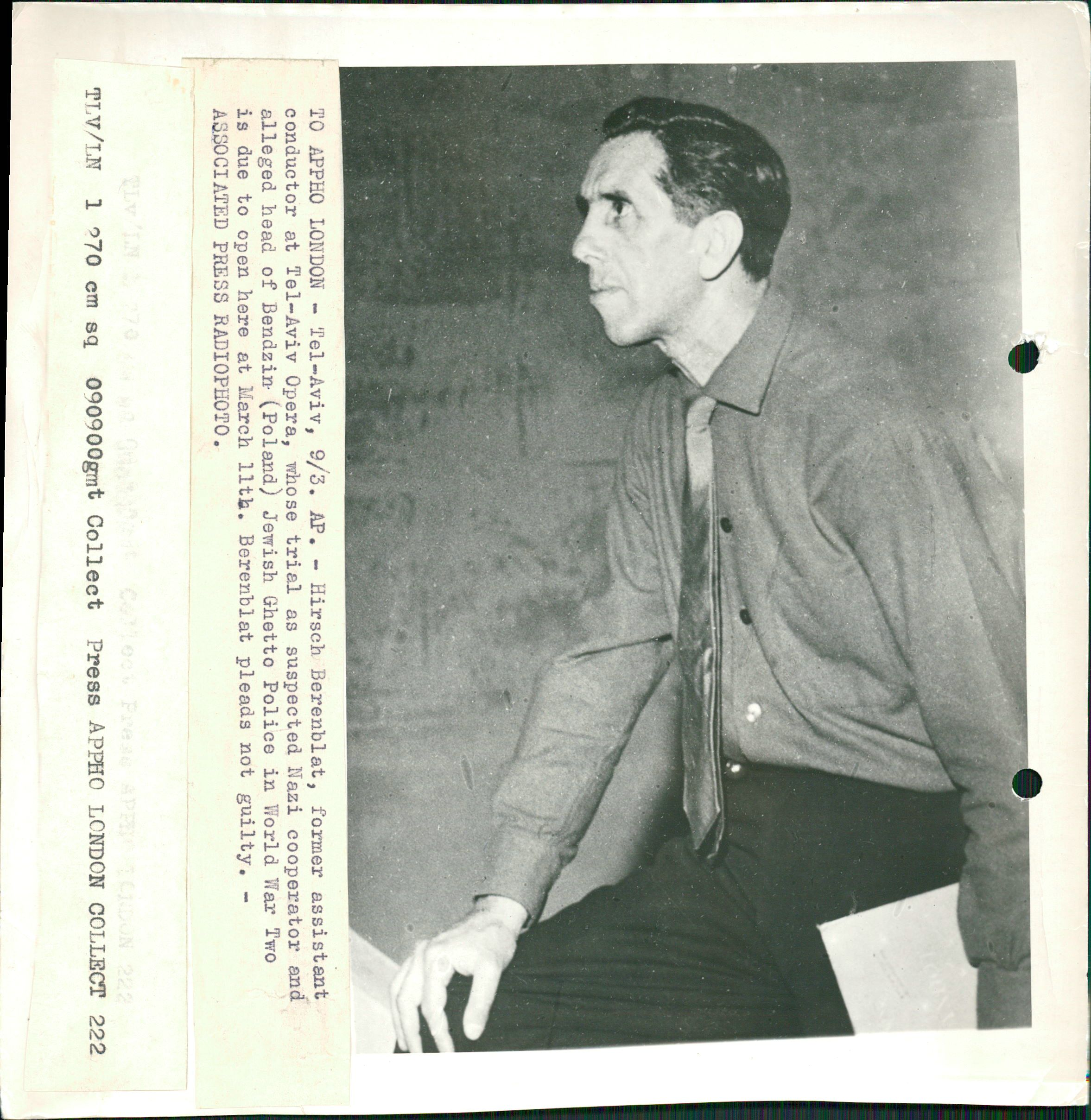
Hirsh Barenblat

Hirsch Barenblat, the conductor of the Israel National Opera, was first tried in 1964 for having turned Jews over to the Nazis as head of the Jewish police in the Bendzin ghetto, Poland. Having arrived in Israel in 1958-9, Barenblat was arrested after a ghetto survivor recognised him while he was conducting an opera. Found guilty of helping the Nazis by ensuring that Jews selected for the death camps did not escape, Barenblat was sentenced to five years in prison. On May 1, 1964, having served three months of the sentence, Barenblat was absolved of the charge, freed and Israel's Supreme Court quashed his conviction.

== See also ==
- Fridrich Kuczynski
