= Fridrich Kuczynski =

Polish Nazi war criminal

Fridrich Karl Kuczyński, another common spelling Fridrich Kuczyńsky (1914, Suczów - 1948 or 22 February 1949) – war criminal, national socialist, head of the department for Jews at the Special Plenipotentiary of Reichsfurer SS and Chief Police for Employment of Foreign Nationalities in the area of Zagłębie Dąbrowskie. Participant, among others, in the selection on 12 August 1942, on the pitch of the Hakoach sports club in Będzin Ghetto, when people who were later deported to extermination camp were selected.

For crimes committed during the occupation against the Jewish nation, responsible for some 100,000 victims, he was sentenced in 1948 by the District Court in Sosnowiec to death penalty. The sentence was carried out by hanging.

Kuczynski was a member of the Organization Schmelt (Dienststelle Schmelt). The selections of Jews were carried out by officials from the Schmelt department, in particular by Friedrich Karl Kuczynski. "Schmelt's office was represented with its own quarters in the Auschwitz concentration camp."

He always wore civilian clothes.

== See also ==
- Organization Schmelt
- Hunt for the Jews
