= Noemi Szac-Wajnkranc =

Polish Jewish resistance fighter and diarist

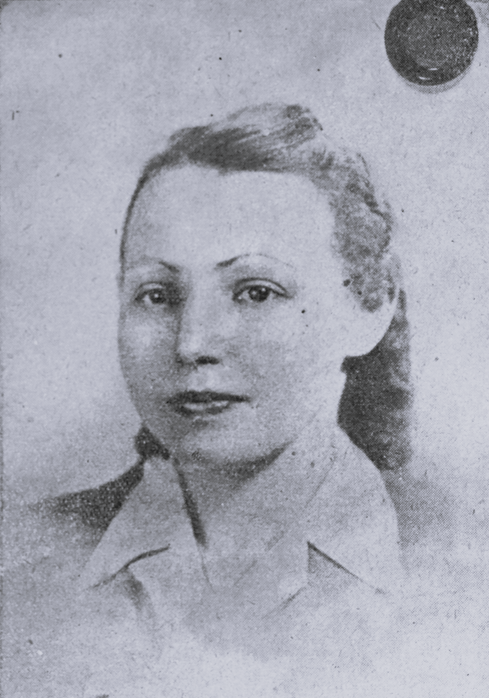
- Born: September 22, 1919; Warsaw, Poland
- Died: January 28, 1945 (aged 25) Łódź, Poland
- Cause of death: Gunshot
- Conflicts: Warsaw Ghetto Uprising
- Spouse: Jerzy Wajnkranc

Noemi Szac-Wajnkranc (September 22, 1919 – January 28, 1945) was a Jewish resistance fighter and diarist.

== Life before the war ==
Noemi was born on September 22, 1919, to a wealthy Jewish family in Warsaw, Poland. Her father was an engineer. Slightly before the war, she married Jurek Wajnkranc, a veteran.

== World War II and death ==
After the Nazi takeover of Poland, Noemi and her family were sent to the Warsaw Ghetto, where she worked as a clerk at a Jewish community's food department. During the Grossaktion Warsaw, she escaped the ghetto and hid outside of Warsaw. According to her diary, she fought in the ghetto uprising; both of her parents were killed during the uprising. After the uprising, she went back into hiding with her husband. In 1943 her husband was taken prisoner by the Nazis and sent to Majdanek concentration camp, where he later died. She died after being hit by a bullet while accompanying the Red Army to Łódź.

== Diary ==
A Red Army lieutenant colonel found her diary on her dead body. It was sent to the Jewish Anti-Fascist Committee in Moscow and then brought to Poland by Efroim Kaganovsky and published in 1947.
