= Ogrodowa Street =

Street in the Wola district of Warsaw, Poland

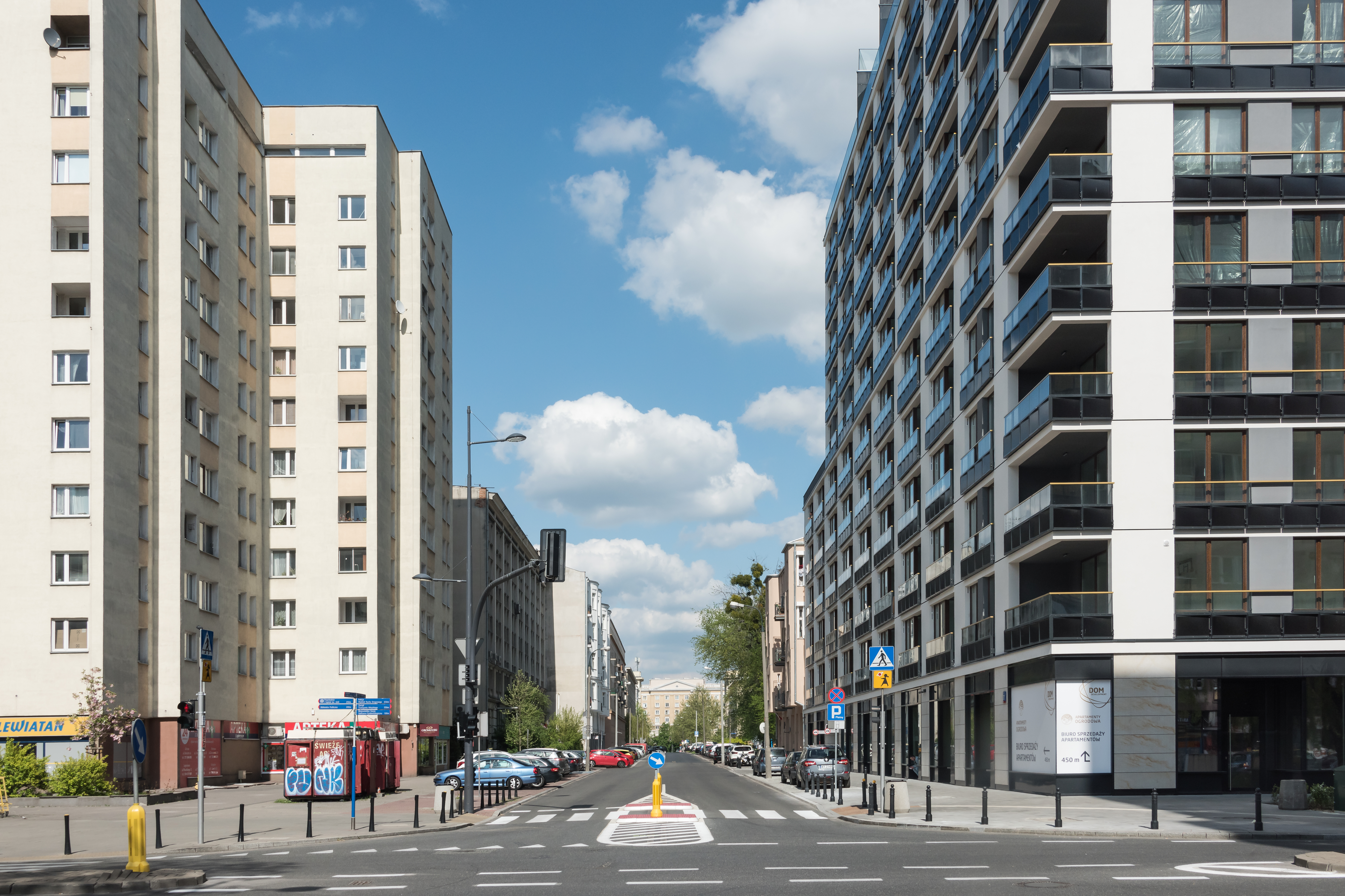
- Ogrodowa Street at the intersection with Żelazna Street

- Location within Poland
- Native name: Ulica Ogrodowa (Polish)
- Length: 1,980 m (6,500 ft)
- Location: Warsaw
- Coordinates: 52.239603°N 20.991421°E

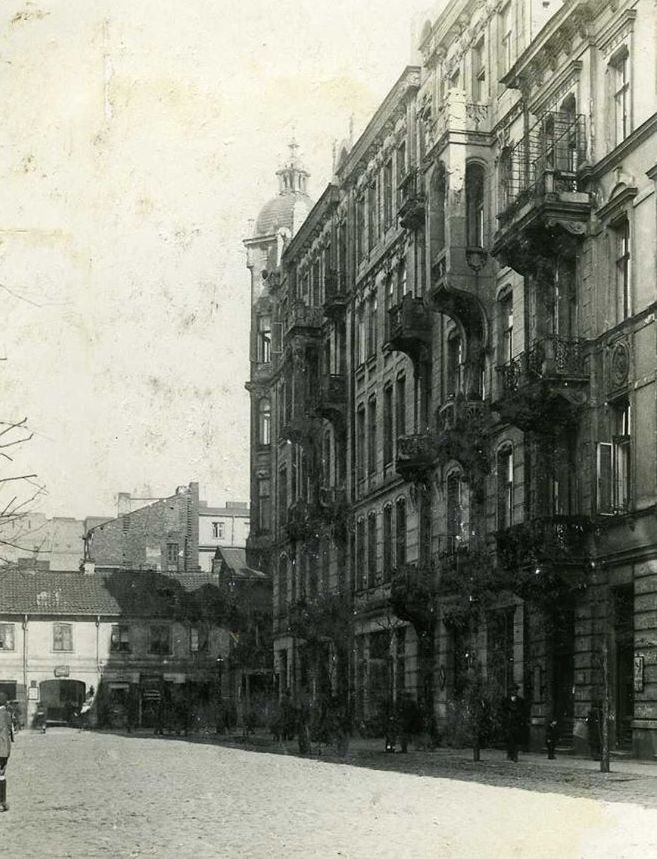
Ogrodowa Street near Solna Street before 1939, with tenements No. 1 and 3 on the right

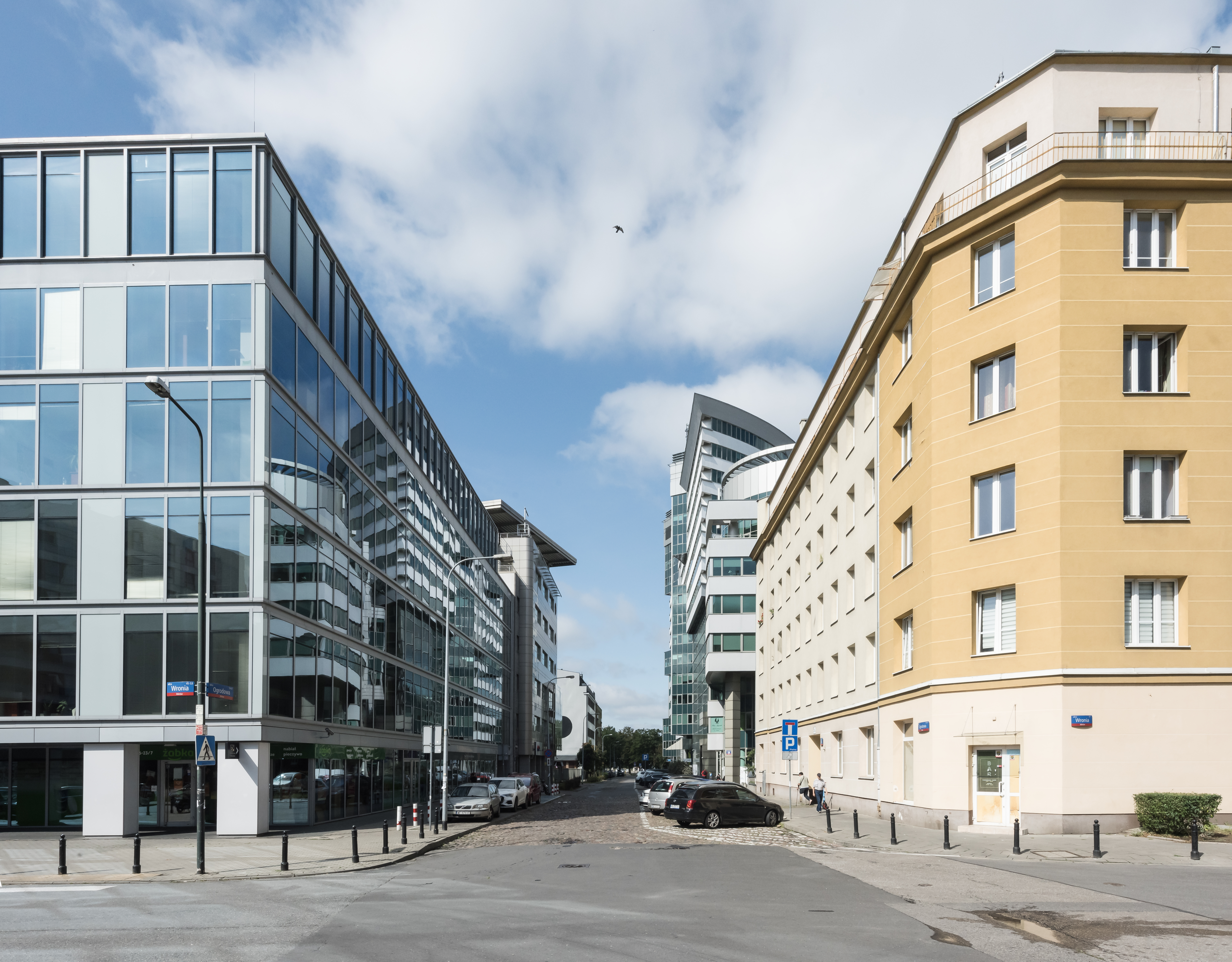
Ogrodowa Street near Wronia Street, looking west (2023)

Ogrodowa Street (Polish: Ulica Ogrodowa) is a street in the Wola district of Warsaw, Poland.

== History ==
Ogrodowa Street, originally a road of the Klucznikowska plot, was laid out after 1765. Named in 1770, it derives its name from the numerous gardens that once lined the area. The street originally extended from Solna Street (now John Paul II Avenue) westward to the city's ramparts (Okopowa Street). In 1784, the street was home to 57 wooden houses and manors, five brick houses, and two breweries. Its rapid development was partly due to its proximity to Chłodna Street, a major western exit route from the city.

By the late 18th century, the street was paved. In 1806, a large tannery owned by Jan Temler was established at the corner of Ogrodowa and Biała streets, later relocated to Okopowa Street in 1858.

In 1842, a fire destroyed the buildings on 16 plots along the street. Between the 1850s and 1860s, the first multi-story tenements began to appear. In 1867, the large Kercelak marketplace was established at the intersection with Okopowa Street. By the turn of the 19th and 20th centuries, the last gardens, which had inspired the street's name, were replaced by buildings. In 1896, a private medical facility established by Maria Szlenkier at No. 17 marked the beginning of the Szlenkier family's philanthropic activities. In the early 20th century and during the interwar period, the street hosted numerous small and medium-sized industrial enterprises. At No. 62, warehouses and stables for the Węgiełek & Co. transport and forwarding company were built, while its owner constructed a preserved tenement with annexes at No. 65. The street was paved with fieldstones at the time, and in the 1930s, the section between Solna and Biała streets was asphalted.

Between 1935 and 1939, a Municipal Court Building, designed by Bohdan Pniewski, was constructed on the plot between Leszno Street and Ogrodowa Street. As it also housed the District Court and Labor Court, it was commonly referred to as the "courts building".

Before 1939, Ogrodowa was one of the most densely built-up and populated streets in this part of the city. A significant proportion of its residents were Jews, who owned about half of the street's buildings. The street's buildings were not damaged during the defence of Warsaw in September 1939.

In November 1940, most of Ogrodowa Street, except for the section west of Wronia Street and a fragment near the courts building and Biała Street, was included in the Warsaw Ghetto established by the German authorities. In December 1941, the section between Wronia and Żelazna Street was excluded from the ghetto. The remaining portion was fully removed from the ghetto and incorporated into the "Aryan" part of the city in August 1942, during the Grossaktion Warsaw (deportations of Jews to the Treblinka extermination camp). From spring to September 1942, the Jewish Ghetto Police was headquartered at No. 17. Throughout the ghetto's existence, the courts building retained its primary function, serving as an enclave within the ghetto, accessible to Jews from Leszno Street and to residents of the "Aryan" part of Warsaw via Biała Street, which was excluded from the ghetto.

On 7 August 1944, during the Warsaw Uprising, German forces advancing toward the Saxon Garden captured the Ogrodowa Street area, forcing insurgents led by Gustaw Billewicz, codenamed Sosna, to retreat from the courts building. The Germans massacred some residents and set fire to the street's buildings. Jewish activists Regina Fudem and Szlomo Baczyński were able to rescue 40 Jews from the burning ghetto by transporting them via the sewers to the relatrive safety of Ogrodowa Street.

After the war, the area around Ogrodowa Street was nicknamed the Wild West. Most damaged 19th-century tenements and industrial structures were demolished. The Mirów estate, designed by Tadeusz Kossak, was built between 1949 and 1960, featuring five-story buildings between Orla Street, Świerczewski Avenue (since 1991 Solidarity Avenue), Żelazna Street, Chłodna Street, and Elektoralna Street. The street was widened between Marchlewski Avenue (now John Paul II Avenue) and Żelazna Street.

A section of the original fieldstone paving has been preserved in front of No. 56. On the western section, a strip of cobblestone is framed by paving stones on both sides.

In September 2021, a mural by Bruno Neuhamer dedicated to Jan Lityński was unveiled on the wall of No. 67.

== Bibliography ==
- Zieliński, Jarosław (2011). Atlas dawnej architektury ulic i placów Warszawy. Tom 15. Objazdowa–Ożarowska [Atlas of Historic Architecture of the Streets and Squares of Warsaw. Volume 15. Objazdowa–Ożarowska] (in Polish). Warsaw: Biblioteka Towarzystwa Opieki nad Zabytkami. ISBN 978-83-88372-42-1.
