= Teresa Janina Kierocińska =

Polish nun (1885–1946)

Venerable Maria Teresa of Saint Joseph CSCII
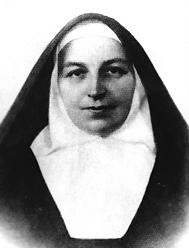
- Born: 14 June 1885; Wieluń, Łódzkie, Russian Empire
- Died: 12 July 1946 (aged 61); Sosnowiec, Śląskie, Poland

Teresa Janina Kierocińska (religious name Maria Teresa of St. Joseph, 14 June 1885 – 12 July 1946) was a Discalced Carmelite nun born in Wieluń, who cofounded the Carmelite Sisters of the Infant Jesus and was honored with the title of the Righteous Among the Nations.

== Life ==
She finished high school in Wieluń. Janina felt the need for total devotion to God on the day of her First Holy Communion but she couldn't follow her call because of the refusal of the family, especially her father. At home she led a life of prayer, deep devotion, self-denial and love towards her neighbors. During her adolescence she came to know the works of Saint Teresa of Jesus which were a great influence in her spiritual life.

From 1909, Anzelm Gądek, a Discalced Carmelite, became her spiritual guide. It was he who founded the first active-contemplative congregation of the Carmelite Sisters of the Infant Jesus, on 31 December 1921. Janina became the first Superior general and a co-founder of the congregation. From that time on, as Mother Teresa of St. Joseph, she started her service to God and people, poorest both in moral and material sense, in the district of Sosnowiec.

She had been the superior of the congregation for 25 years, till the day of her death. She followed the constitution of the congregation forming the life of the sisters in the spirit of the divine childhood and apostolic and charitable work among the poor. She had a special veneration to the Infant Jesus, Holy Eucharist, the most Holy Face of Jesus, Our Lady of Mt Carmel, and St. Joseph.

During the Second World War, she showed heroic courage saving many young girls from deportation to Germany by hiding them in the cloister. She helped refugees, soldiers of the Home Army, organized an orphanage and a canteen for the poor, and taught them clandestinely. In 1992, she was posthumously honored by Yad Vashem in Jerusalem as Righteous Among the Nations for saving Jewish refugees.

After the Second World War, she was actively involved in new tasks of the Catholic Church in Poland. The people of Zagłębie district considered her to be simply their Mother. The sisters of the congregation taught catechism in the schools, ran a kindergarten and performed works of charity.

== Death ==
She died on 12 July 1946 in Sosnowiec. The process of her beatification in the Archdiocese of Częstochowa lasted from 1983 to 1988. In May 2013, Pope Francis signed the decree of her heroic virtues. Her remains are found in the church of her congregation in Sosnowiec (ul. Matki Teresy Kierocińskiej 25).

== Remembrance ==
She was recognized as Righteous Among the Nations in 1992.
