= Regina Fudem =

Polish Jewish activist (1922–1943)

- רעגינע פֿודעם
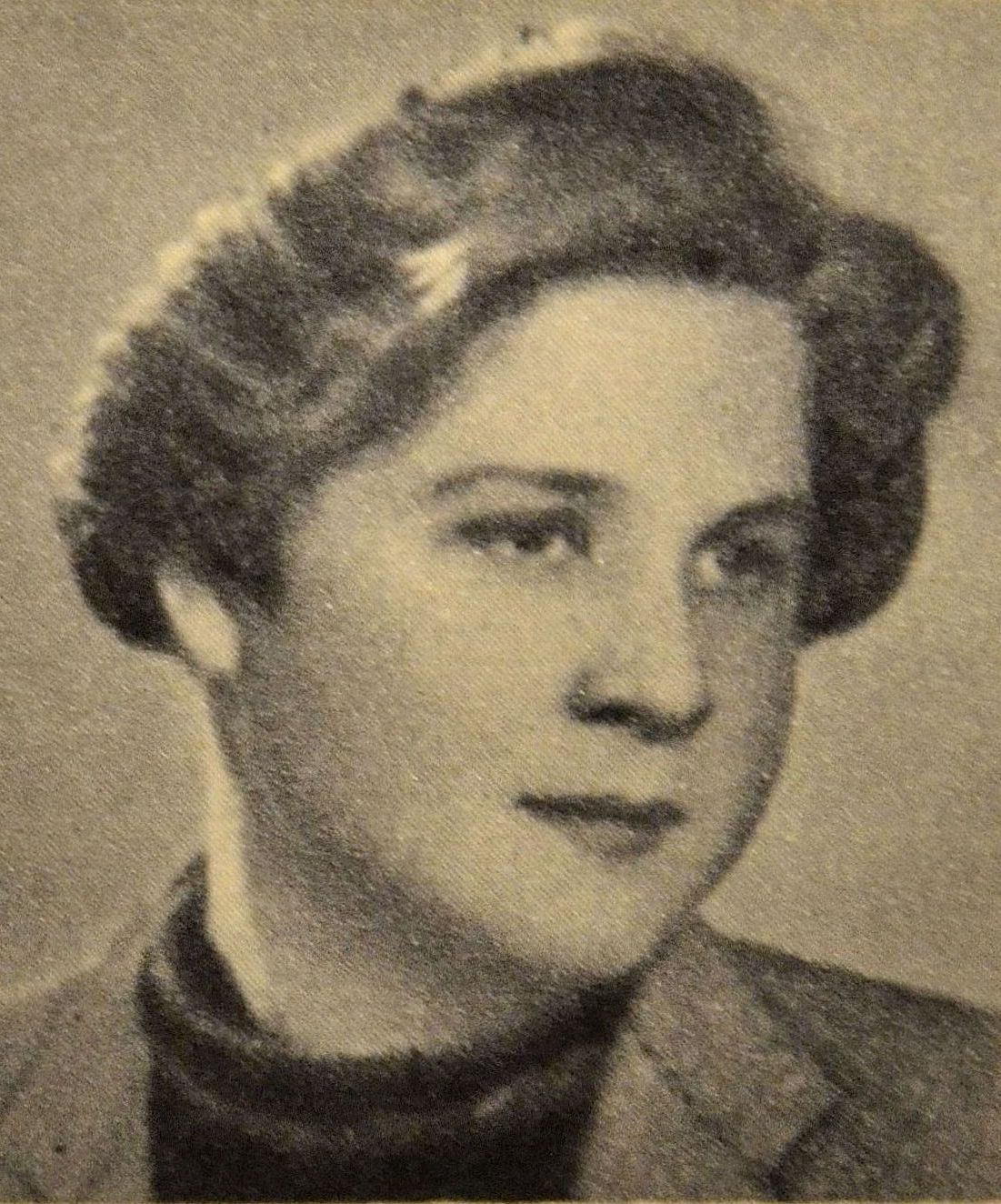
- Born: 1922; Warsaw, Warsaw Voivodeship, Second Polish Republic
- Died: 1943 (aged 20–21); Warsaw Ghetto, General Government
- Organization: Jewish Combat Organisation
- Known for: Rescuing 40 people during the Warsaw Ghetto Uprising
- Honours: Order of Virtuti Militari

Regina Fudem (Yiddish: רעגינע פֿודעם; 1922–1943), also known by the code name Lilit, was a Polish Jewish activist. She was known for her participation in the Warsaw Ghetto Uprising, in which she helped rescue at least 40 people before being killed.

== Early life and education ==
Fudem was born in 1922 into a poor Jewish family living in Warsaw, to Szyja Fudem, a tailor, and his wife, Jochwet (née Chwat); she had five brothers and one sister. Fudem completed four years of high school before beginning work. In 1937, she joined the Zionist youth organisation Hashomer Hatzair.

Fudem's name is often misspelled as "Fuden" due to a typological error that was subsequently repeated multiple times.

== Participation in the Jewish resistance ==
In 1940, Fudem and her family were forcibly resettled into the Warsaw Ghetto. There, she participated in cultural activities, including acting in a Hebrew drama club. Fudem also started participated in underground activities as a member of the Jewish Combat Organisation (ŻOB), where she used the code name Lilit. The ŻOB was founded in October 1942, and aimed to better organise the Jewish resistance and prevent further deporations and protect the Jewish population of Poland. She maintained contact between the ghetto and the Polish underground movement. Historian and Holocaust survivor Izrael Gutman later described Fudem in his autobiography as being one of the oldest and most experienced of the ŻOB's couriers.

In 1942, Fudem's entire family was deported from the ghetto to Treblinka extermination camp; her parents, grandparents, four of her brothers and her sister were murdered there. Fudem escaped the deportation by going into hiding. Her brother Leon became the sole member of the family to survive the Holocaust, and later testified about his family's experiences and fate at Yad Vashem.

== Warsaw Ghetto Uprising and death ==
Following the start of Warsaw Ghetto Uprising on 19 April 1943, Fudem served as a liaison for combat groups operating in the Toebbens and Schultz workshops, continuing to do so even after she was wounded. She was known for her knowledge of the sewer tunnels underneath the ghetto, which she had reconnoitred prior to the uprising as part of plans to use them as possible escape routes for a future rebellion. On 29 April 1943, after Nazi soldiers set fire to various houses in the ghetto, Fudem led a group of 40 fighters through the sewers to Ogrodowa Street, outside of the Jewish ghetto, where a prearranged transport was able to take them to a safe location in the forest near Łomianki. Fudem, alongside fellow resistance member Szlomo Baczyński, returned to the ghetto to attempt to lead at least two additional groups to safety from the fires. Both Fudem and Baczyński are understood to have been killed during the second rescue operation, though the exact circumstances remain unclear. Fudem was 21 at the time of her death. She and Baczyński are assumed to have been killed in early May 1943, though her date of death has also been given as 30 April 1943.

== Recognition ==
In 1948, Fudem posthumously received the Silver Medal of Merit on the Field of Glory, a military decoration. In 1963, she received the Silver Cross of the Order of Virtuti Militari.
