= Ghetto uprisings =

Jewish armed uprisings against Nazi Germany

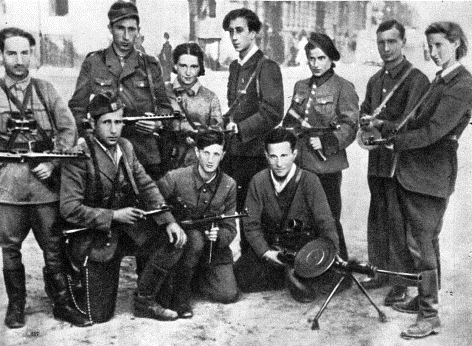
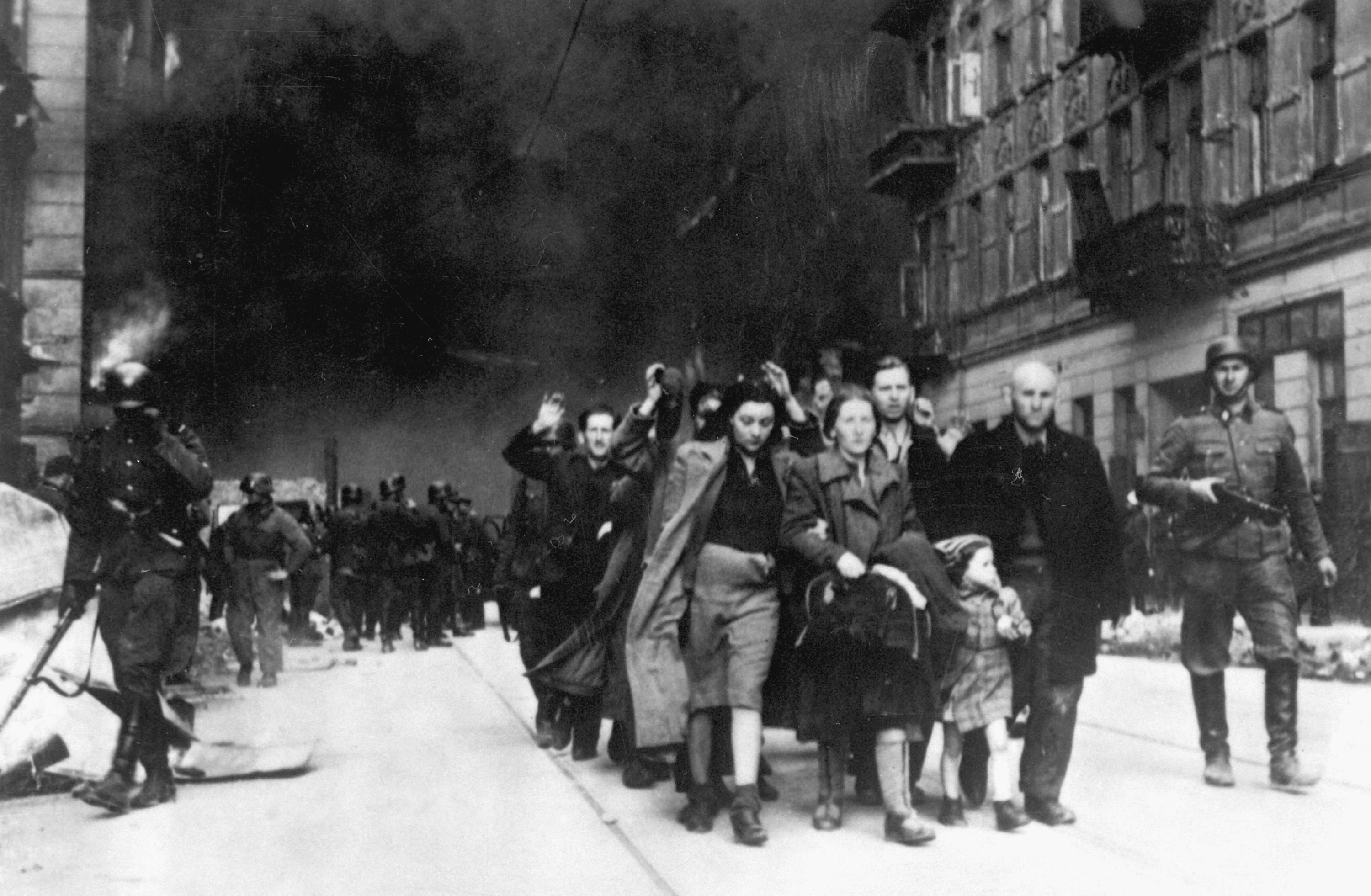
- Top: members of the United Partisan Organization (FPO) in the Vilna Ghetto, one of the first armed resistance organizations established in the Nazi ghettos during World War II. Bottom: captured Jews during Warsaw Ghetto Uprising led by the Germans for deportation to death camps. Picture taken at Nowolipie street, near the intersection with Smocza
- Location: German-occupied Europe
- Date: 1941–1943, World War II
- Incident type: Armed revolt

The ghetto uprisings during World War II were a series of armed revolts against the regime of Nazi Germany between 1941 and 1943 in the newly established Jewish ghettos across Nazi-occupied Europe. Following the German and Soviet invasion of Poland in September 1939, Polish Jews were targeted from the outset. Within months inside occupied Poland, the Germans created hundreds of ghettos in which they forced the Jews to live. The new ghettos were part of the German official policy of removing Jews from public life with the aim of economic exploitation. The combination of excess numbers of inmates, unsanitary conditions and lack of food resulted in a high death rate among them. In most cities the Jewish underground resistance movements developed almost instantly, although ghettoization had severely limited their access to resources.

The ghetto fighters took up arms during the most deadly phase of the Holocaust known as Operation Reinhard (launched in 1942), against the Nazi plans to deport all prisoners – men, women and children – to camps, with the aim of their mass extermination.

== History ==
Armed resistance was offered in over 100 locations on either side of Polish-Soviet border of 1939, overwhelmingly in eastern Poland. Some of these uprisings were more massive and organized, while others were small and spontaneous. The best known and the biggest of all Jewish uprisings during the Holocaust took place in the Warsaw Ghetto between 19 April and 16 May 1943, and in Białystok in August. In the course of the Warsaw Ghetto Uprising 56,065 Jews were either killed on the spot or captured and transported aboard Holocaust trains to extermination camps before the Ghetto was razed to the ground. At the Białystok Ghetto, following deportations in which 10,000 Jews were led to the Holocaust trains, and another 2,000 were murdered locally, the ghetto underground staged an uprising, resulting in a blockade of the ghetto which lasted for a full month. There were other such struggles, leading to the wholesale burning of the ghettos such as in Kołomyja (now Kolomyia, Ukraine), and mass shootings of women and children as in Mizocz.

== Selected ghetto uprisings during the Holocaust ==
The uprisings erupted in five major cities, 45 provincial towns, 5 major concentration and extermination camps, as well as in at least 18 forced labor camps. Notable ghetto uprisings included:

- Slonim Ghetto revolt of 29 June 1942
- Łachwa (Lakhva) Ghetto Uprising of 3 September 1942
- Mizoch Ghetto Uprising of 14 October 1942
- Mińsk Mazowiecki Ghetto prisoner revolt of 10 January 1943
- Warsaw Ghetto Uprising 19 April – 16 May 1943, organised by the ŻOB and ŻZW
- Częstochowa Ghetto Uprising of 25–30 June 1943
- Będzin Ghetto Uprising also known as the Będzin-Sosnowiec Ghetto Uprising of 3 August 1943
- Białystok Ghetto Uprising 16–17 August 1943, organized by the Antyfaszystowska Organizacja Bojowa

To some extent, the final liquidation of other ghettos was also met with armed struggle:

- Kraków Ghetto
- Łódź Ghetto
- Lwów Ghetto
- Lutsk Ghetto
- Marcinkonys Ghetto
- Minsk Ghetto
- Pińsk Ghetto
- Riga Ghetto
- Sosnowiec Ghetto
- Wilno (Vilna) Ghetto – resistance of the Fareinigte Partizaner Organizacje

== See also ==
- Ghettos in Nazi-occupied Europe
- Ghetto Fighters' House
- Jewish response to The Forty Days of Musa Dagh
