= Organization Schmelt =

Nazi SS organization

Organization Schmelt (German: Dienststelle Schmelt) was a Nazi SS organization that ran a system of forced-labor camps with mostly Jewish prisoners. It originated in East Upper Silesia, but spread to the Sudetenland and other areas. Many of its camps were later absorbed into concentration camp systems such as Auschwitz and Gross-Rosen.
