= Jewish Combat Organization =

World War II Jewish resistance movement in Nazi-occupied Poland

Żydowska Organizacja Bojowa ייִדישע קאַמף אָרגאַניזאַציע
- Jewish Combat Organization
- Active: 28 July 1942
- Country: Nazi occupied Poland
- Engagements: World War II: Warsaw Ghetto Uprising

Commanders
- Notable commanders: Mordechai Anielewicz; Yitzhak Zuckerman; Marek Edelman

The Jewish Combat Organization (Polish: Żydowska Organizacja Bojowa, ŻOB; Yiddish: ייִדישע קאַמף אָרגאַניזאַציע Yidishe Kamf Organizatsie; often translated to English as the Jewish Fighting Organization) was a World War II resistance movement in occupied Poland, which emerged from the merger of five Jewish political and youth organizations: Hashomer Hatzair, Habonim Dror, Poale Zion, and the Bund, and was central in organizing and launching the Warsaw Ghetto Uprising. ŻOB took part in a number of other resistance activities as well.

== Offshoot of Jewish youth groups ==
The ŻOB was formed on 28 July 1942, six days after the German Nazis under SS General Jurgen Stroop began the Grossaktion Warsaw, started on 15 July on the same year, and sealing the fate of the Jews confined in the Warsaw Ghetto: "All Jewish persons living in Warsaw, regardless of age and gender, [would] be resettled in the East." Thus began massive "deportations" of about 254,000 Jews, all of whom were sent to the Treblinka extermination camp. The Grossaktion lasted until 12 September 1942. Overall, it reduced the once thriving Warsaw Jewish community of some 400,000 to a mere 55,000 to 60,000 inhabitants.

The youth groups that were instrumental in forming the ŻOB had anticipated German intentions to annihilate Warsaw Jewry and began to shift from an educational and cultural focus to self-defense and eventual armed struggle.

Unlike the older generation, the youth groups took these reports seriously and had no illusions about the true intentions of the Germans. A document published three months before the start of the deportations by Hashomer Hatzair declared: "We know that Hitler's system of murder, slaughter and robbery leads steadily to a dead end and the destruction of the Jews."

A number of the left Zionist youth groups, such as Hashomer Hatzair and Dror, proposed the creation of a self-defense organization at a meeting of Warsaw Jewish leaders in March 1942. The proposal was rejected by the Jewish Labour Bund, who believed that a fighting organization would fail without the help of the Polish resistance. Others rejected the notion of armed insurgency, saying that there was no evidence of a threat of deportation. Moreover, they argued that any armed resistance would provoke the Germans to retaliate against the whole Jewish community.

Women played a central role in the ŻOB as couriers, organizers, smugglers, intelligence operatives, and fighters. Because women were often perceived by German authorities as less likely to be involved in armed resistance, they were frequently able to move between ghettos and on the "Aryan side" using forged documents, transporting weapons, messages, and supplies.

Several women became prominent members of the organization, including Zivia Lubetkin, one of the leaders of the Warsaw Ghetto resistance; Frumka Płotnicka, who helped organize underground activity in multiple ghettos; Mira Fuchrer, a liaison and resistance activist closely associated with Mordechai Anielewicz; and Vladka Meed, who served as a courier between Jewish and Polish underground networks.

The formation of the ŻOB represented an unusual political alliance within prewar Polish Jewish politics. The organization brought together members of socialist-Zionist youth movements, Labor Zionist groups, communists, and the Jewish Labour Bund, despite longstanding ideological divisions between Zionist and non-Zionist Jewish political currents. Historians have noted that the mass deportations during the Grossaktion Warsaw in the summer of 1942 and growing awareness of Nazi extermination policies helped create the conditions for broader political cooperation and armed resistance within the Warsaw Ghetto.

In November 1942, ŻOB officially became part of and subordinated its activities to the High Command of the Armia Krajowa. In return, the Home Army (Armia Krajowa) began providing ŻOB with weapons and training, with the first shipment of guns and ammunition being provided in December 1942. The organization was spied upon by Jewish collaborators which the Nazis called the Society of Free Jews (Towarzystwo Wolnych Żydów).

== ŻOB resistance to the second deportation ==
On 18 January 1943, the Nazis began a second wave of deportations. The first Jews the Germans rounded up included a number of ŻOB fighters who had intentionally crept into the column of deportees. Led by Mordechai Anielewicz, they waited for the appropriate signal, then stepped out of formation, and fought the Nazis with small arms. The column scattered, and news of the ŻZW and ŻOB action quickly spread throughout the ghetto. During this small deportation, the Nazis only managed to round up about 5,000 to 6,000 Jews.

The deportations lasted four days, during which the Germans met other acts of resistance from the ŻOB. When they left the ghetto on 22 January 1943, the remaining Jews regarded it as a victory, however Israel Gutman, a member of the ŻOB who subsequently became one of the leading authors on Jewish Warsaw wrote, "It [was] not known [to the Jews] that the Germans had not intended to liquidate the entire ghetto by means of the January deportations." However, Gutman concludes that the "[January] deportations... had a decisive influence on the ghetto's last months." Among the ŻOB fighters in the January 1943 action was Jakub Krzepicki, a HaNoar HaTzioni member who had escaped from the Treblinka extermination camp the previous September; his testimony on the camp, dictated to Rachel Auerbach, is preserved in the Ringelblum Archive.

== Final deportation and uprising ==
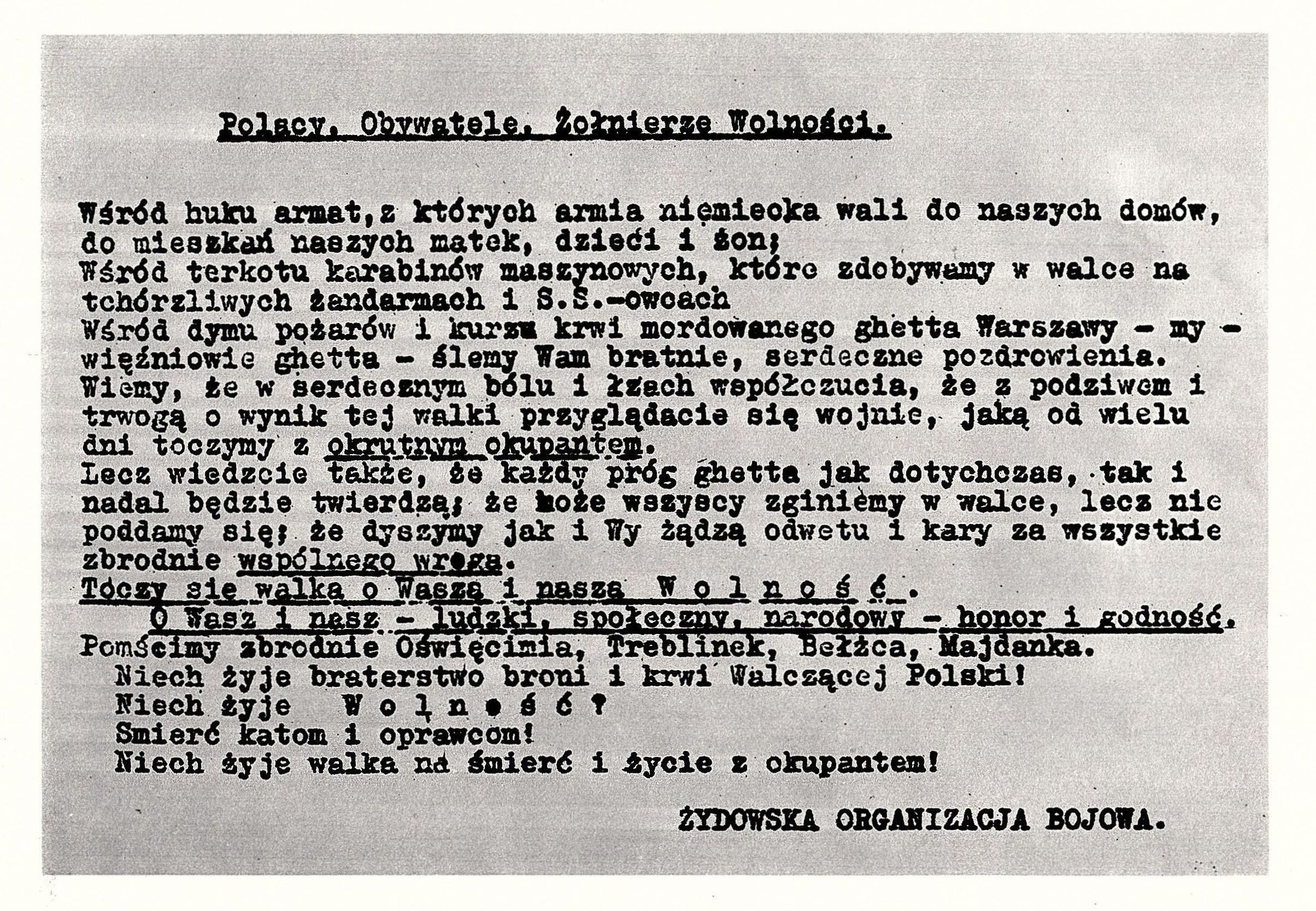
ŻOB's appeal to the Polish people issued on 23 April 1943

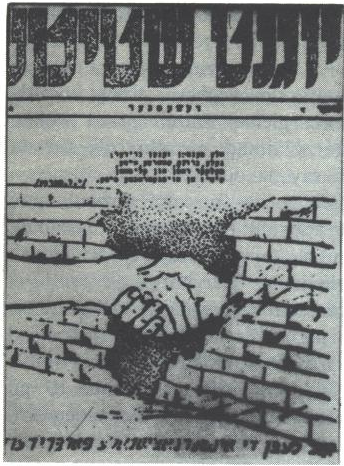
A poster of the Jewish Combat Organization. The Yiddish text reads: "All people are equal brothers; Brown, White, Black, and Yellow. To talk of peoples, colors, races - Is all a made-up story!"

The final deportation began on the eve of Passover, 19 April 1943. The streets of the ghetto were vacant; most of the remaining 30,000 Jews were hiding in carefully prepared bunkers, including their headquarters located in Ulica Miła 18, many of which had electricity and running water; however, they offered no route of escape.

When the Germans marched into the ghetto, they met fierce armed resistance from fighters attacking from open windows in vacated apartments. The defenders of the ghetto used guerrilla warfare tactics and had the strategic advantage not only of surprise but also of being able to look down on their opponents. This advantage was lost when the Germans began systematically burning all of the buildings of the ghetto, forcing the fighters to seek cover in the underground bunkers. The fires above consumed much of the available oxygen below ground, turning the bunkers into suffocating death traps. Regina Fudem and Szlomo Baczyński were able to help 40 people escaping the burning buildings through the sewer system, and were subsequently killed while trying to rescue further people.

On May 8 in the bunker at 18 Mila Street, Jurek Wilner called on the fighters to commit mass suicide to avoid falling into the Germans' hands. As the first one, Lutek Rotblat initially shot his mother and then himself. In the bunker, most of the members of the Combat Organization found their deaths, including Commander Mordechaj Anielewicz.

By 16 May 1943, the German Police General Jürgen Stroop, who had been in charge of the final deportation, officially declared what he called the Grossaktion finished. To celebrate, he razed Warsaw's Great Synagogue. The ghetto was destroyed, and what remained of the uprising was suppressed.

== Epilogue ==
Even after the destruction of the ghetto, small numbers of Jews could still be found in the underground bunkers on both sides of the ghetto wall. In fact, during the last months of the ghetto, some 20,000 Jews fled to the Aryan side. Some Jews who escaped the final destruction of the ghetto, including youth group members and leaders Kazik Ratajzer, Zivia Lubetkin, Yitzhak Zuckerman, and Marek Edelman, would participate in the 1944 Warsaw Uprising against the Nazis.

While many members and leaders of the youth groups perished in the Warsaw Ghetto, Zionist and non-Zionist youth movements remain active. One can still find the left Zionist youth groups Hashomer Hatzair and Habonim Dror in countries such as Argentina, Australia, Austria, Belgium, Brazil, Bulgaria, Canada, Chile, France, Germany, Hungary, Israel, Italy, Mexico, the Netherlands, Poland, South Africa, Switzerland, Ukraine, the United Kingdom, the United States and Uruguay. There are still remnants of the non-Zionist Jewish Labour Bund's S.K.I.F. in Australia, the United Kingdom, France, and the United States. The right youth group Betar operates in Australia, Brazil, Western Europe, and the United States, and Bnei Akiva, a religious Zionist organization, operates worldwide.

== Similar organizations ==
A second Jewish resistance organization called the Jewish Military Union (Polish: Żydowski Związek Wojskowy, ŻZW), formed primarily of former officers of the Polish Army in late 1939, operated side by side with ŻOB & was also instrumental in the Jewish armed struggle.

== Gallery ==
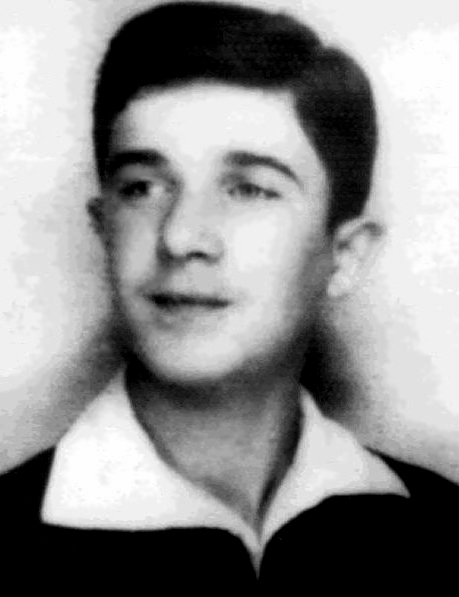
Mordechai Anielewicz

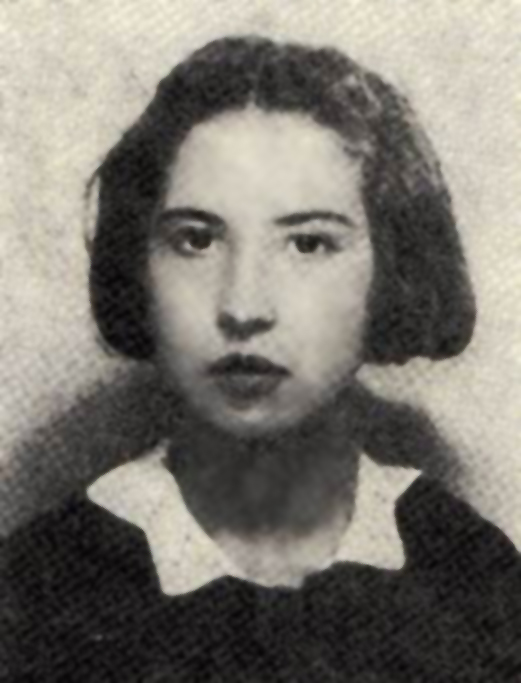
Mira Fuchrer

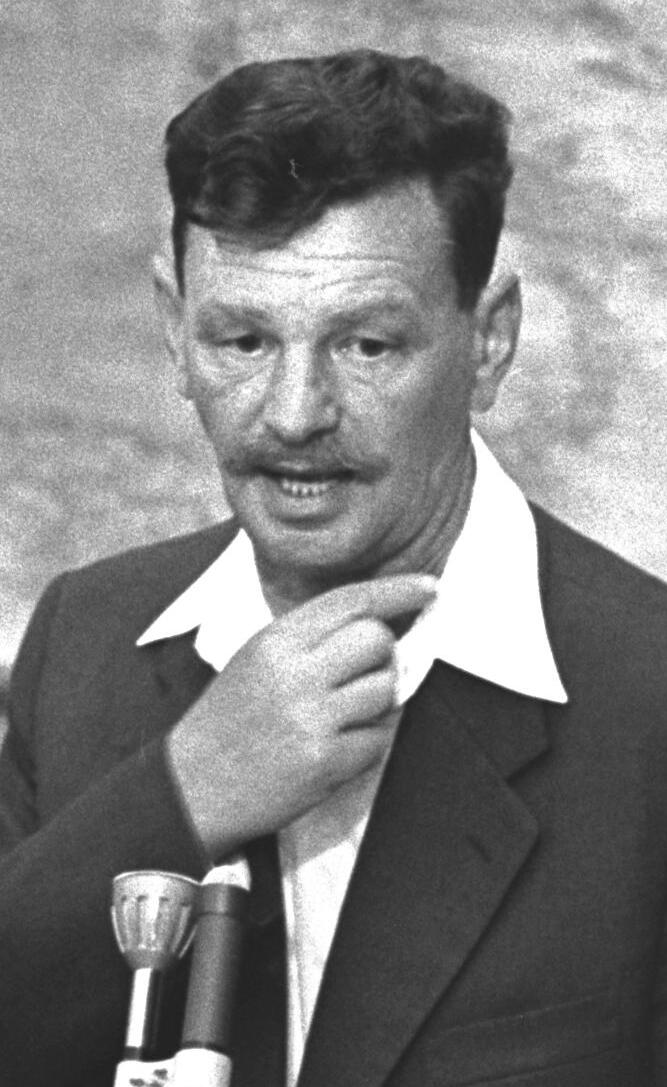
Yitzhak Zukermann

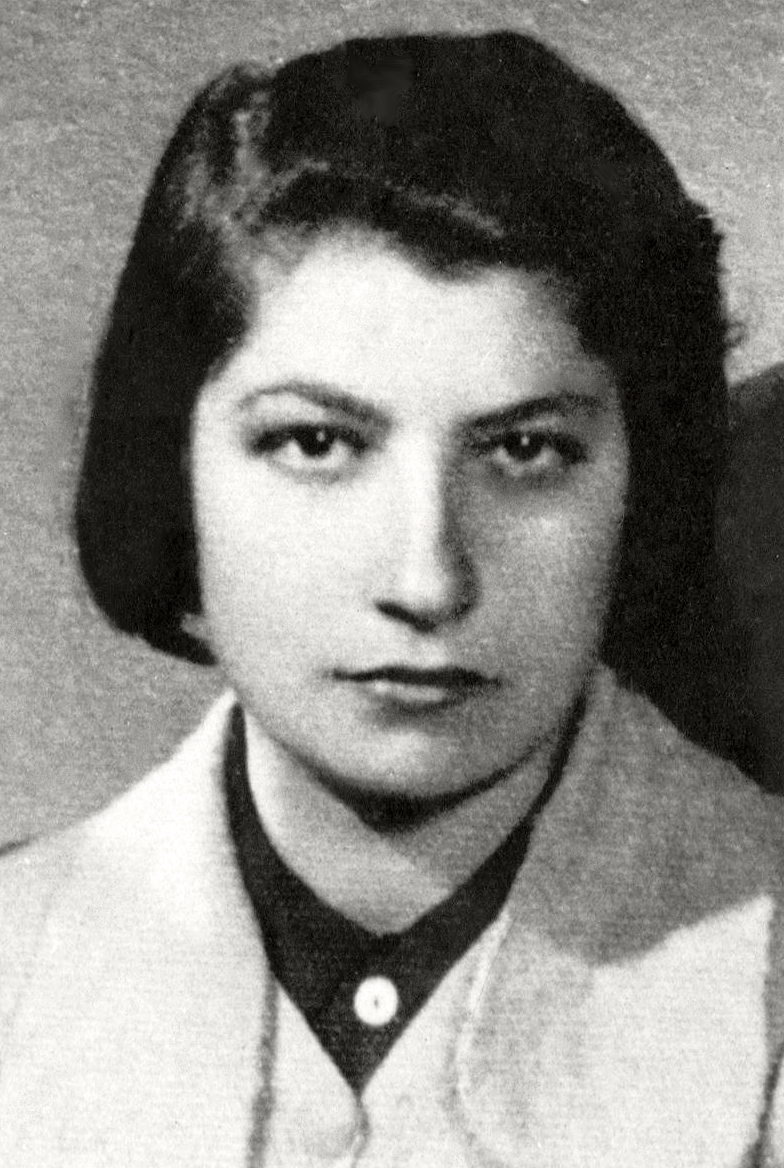
Zivia Lubetkin

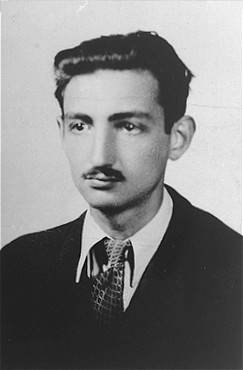
Marek Edelman

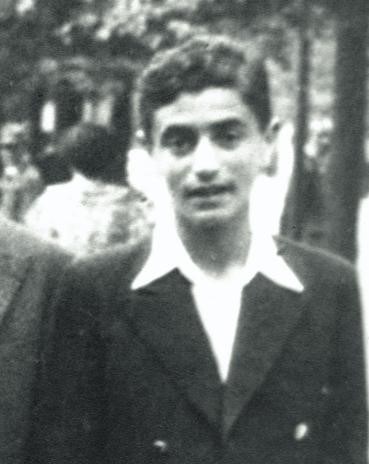
Izrael Kanal

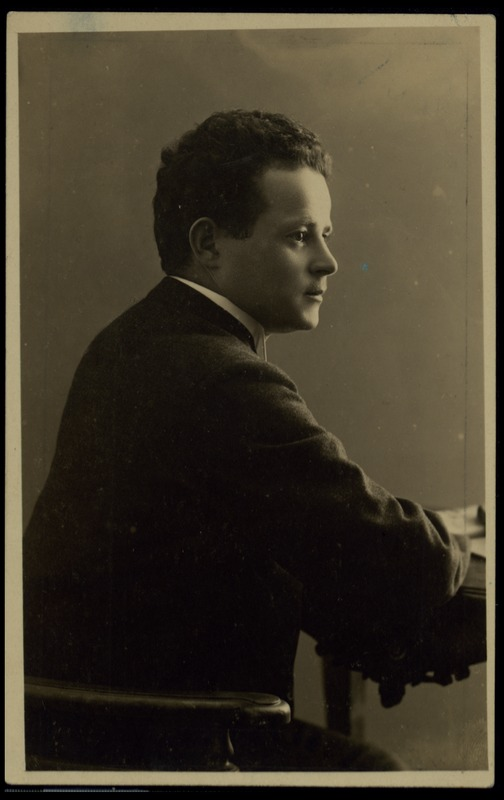
Itzhak Katzenelson

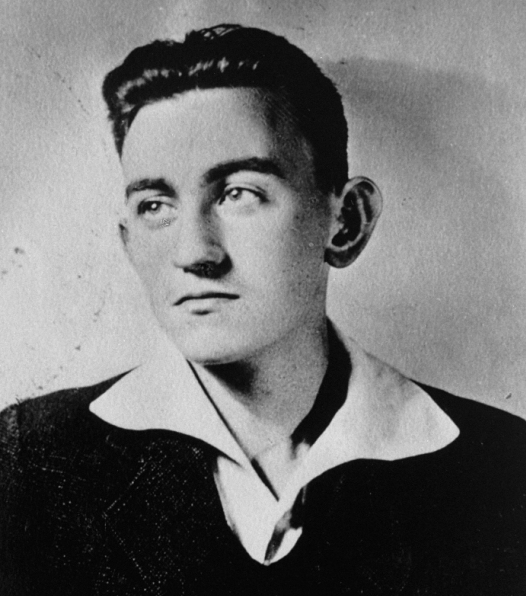
Michael Klepfisz

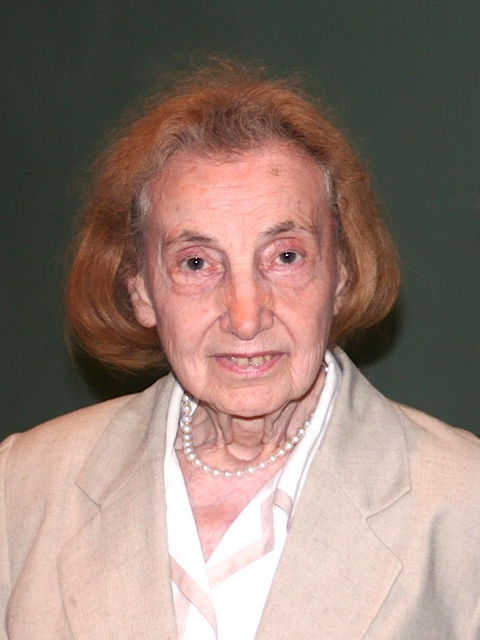
Vladka Meed

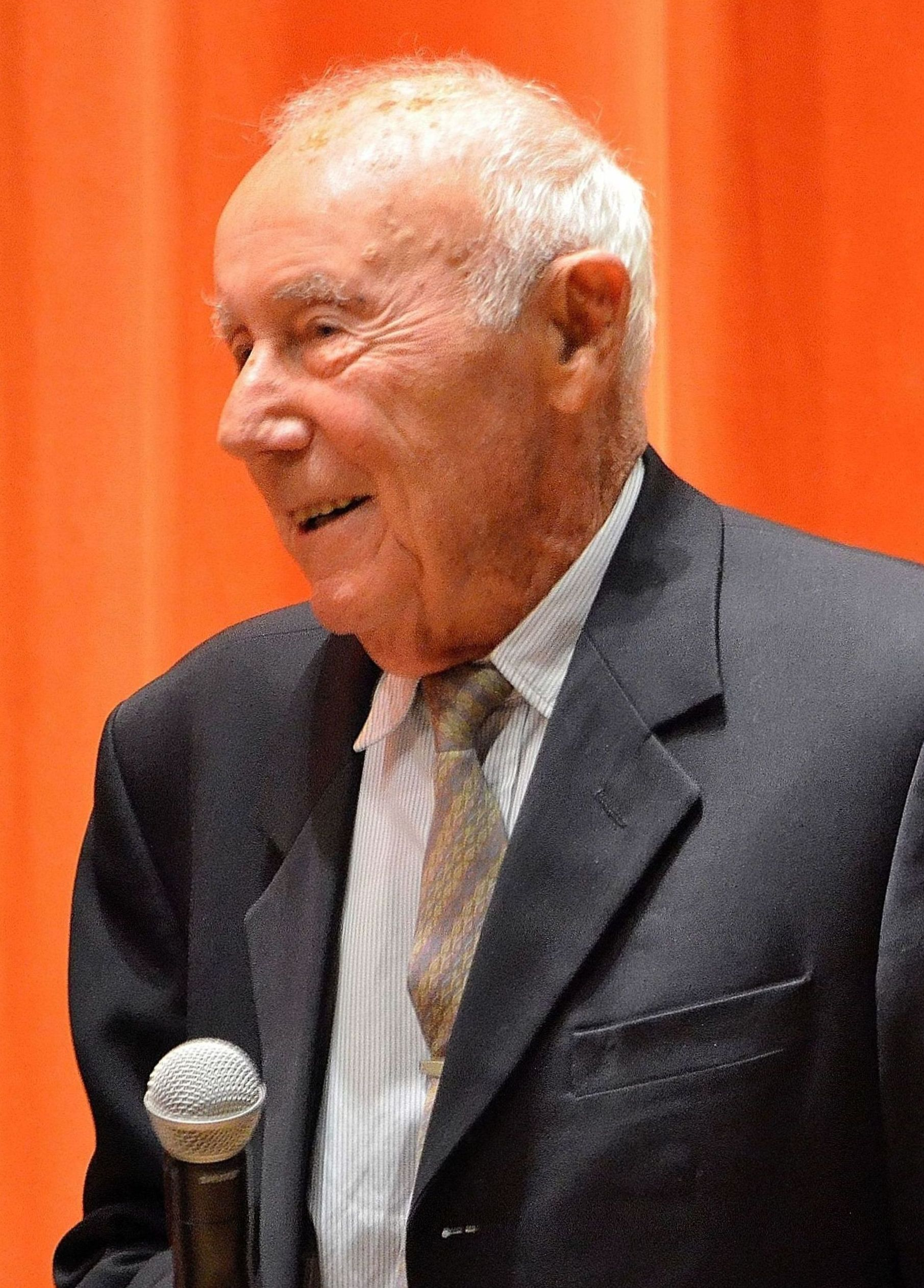
Symcha Ratajzer

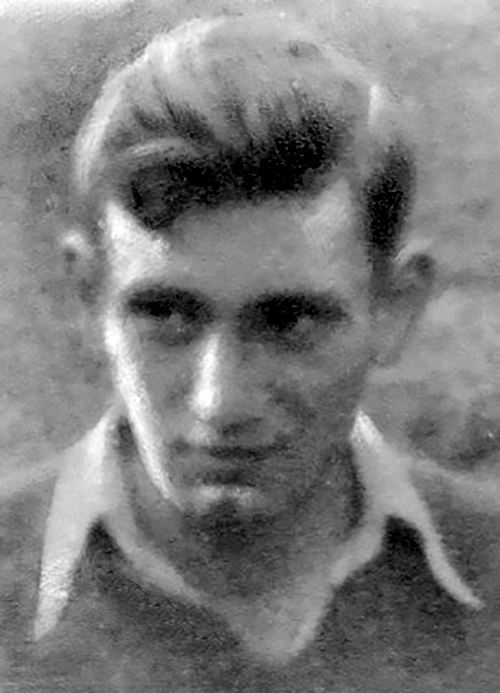
Yitzhak Sukenik

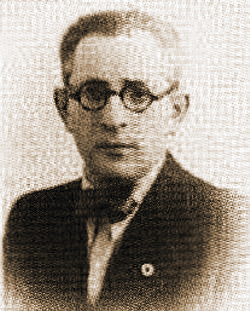
Dawid Wdowiński [ZZW]

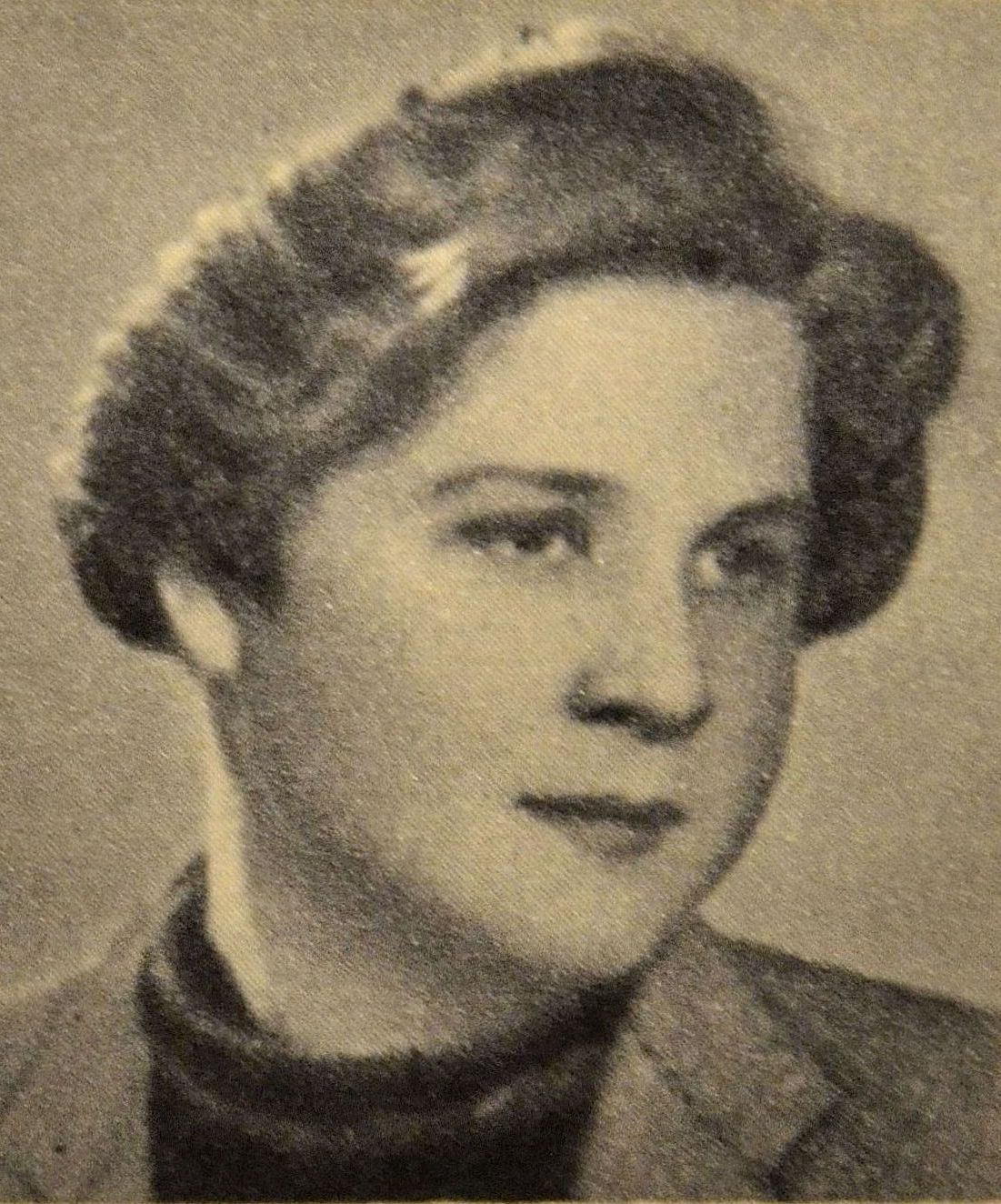
Regina Fudem
