= Dąbrowa Basin =

Region in Poland

Coordinates: 50°20′N 19°11′E

Dąbrowa Basin Zagłębie Dąbrowskie
- Historical region
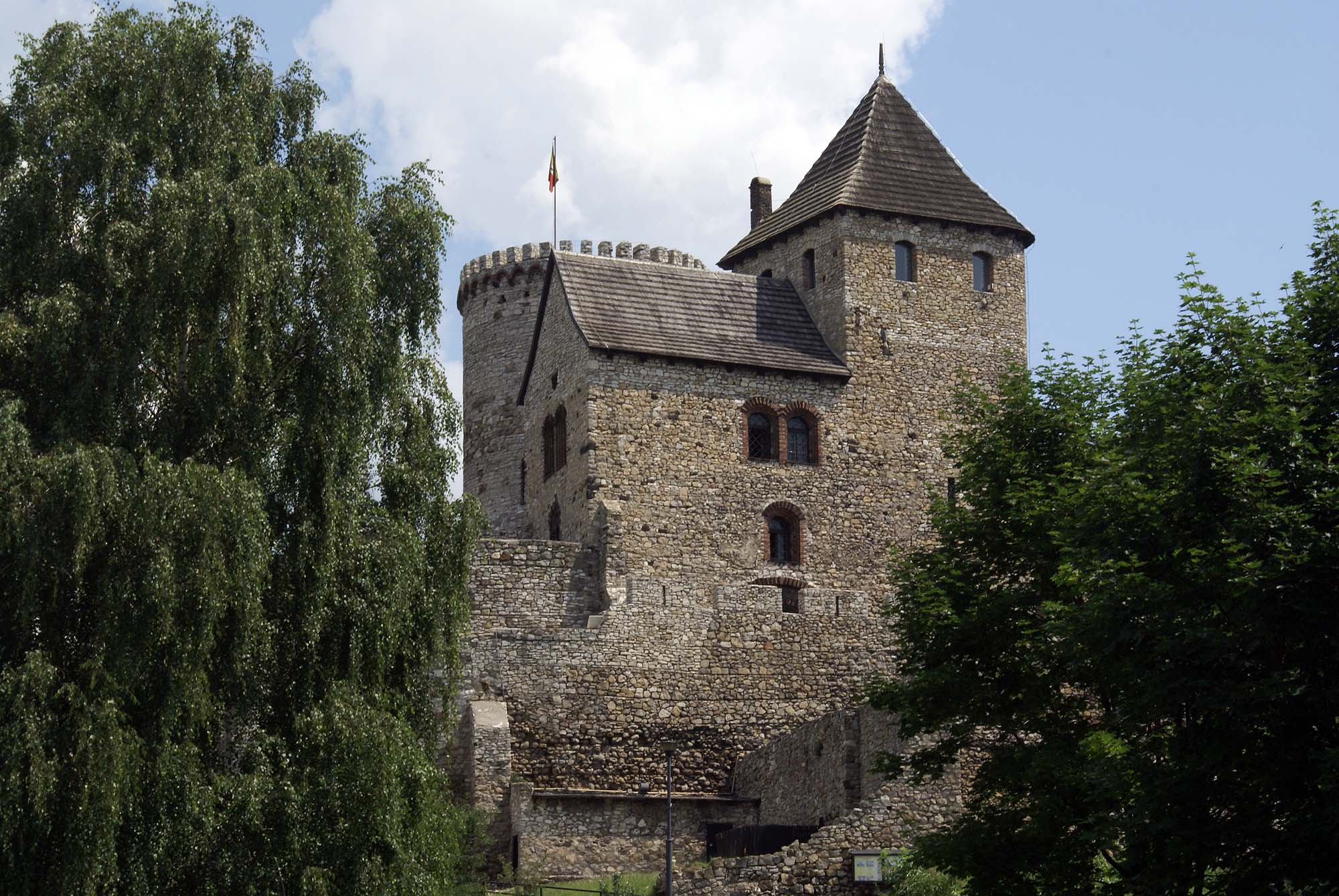
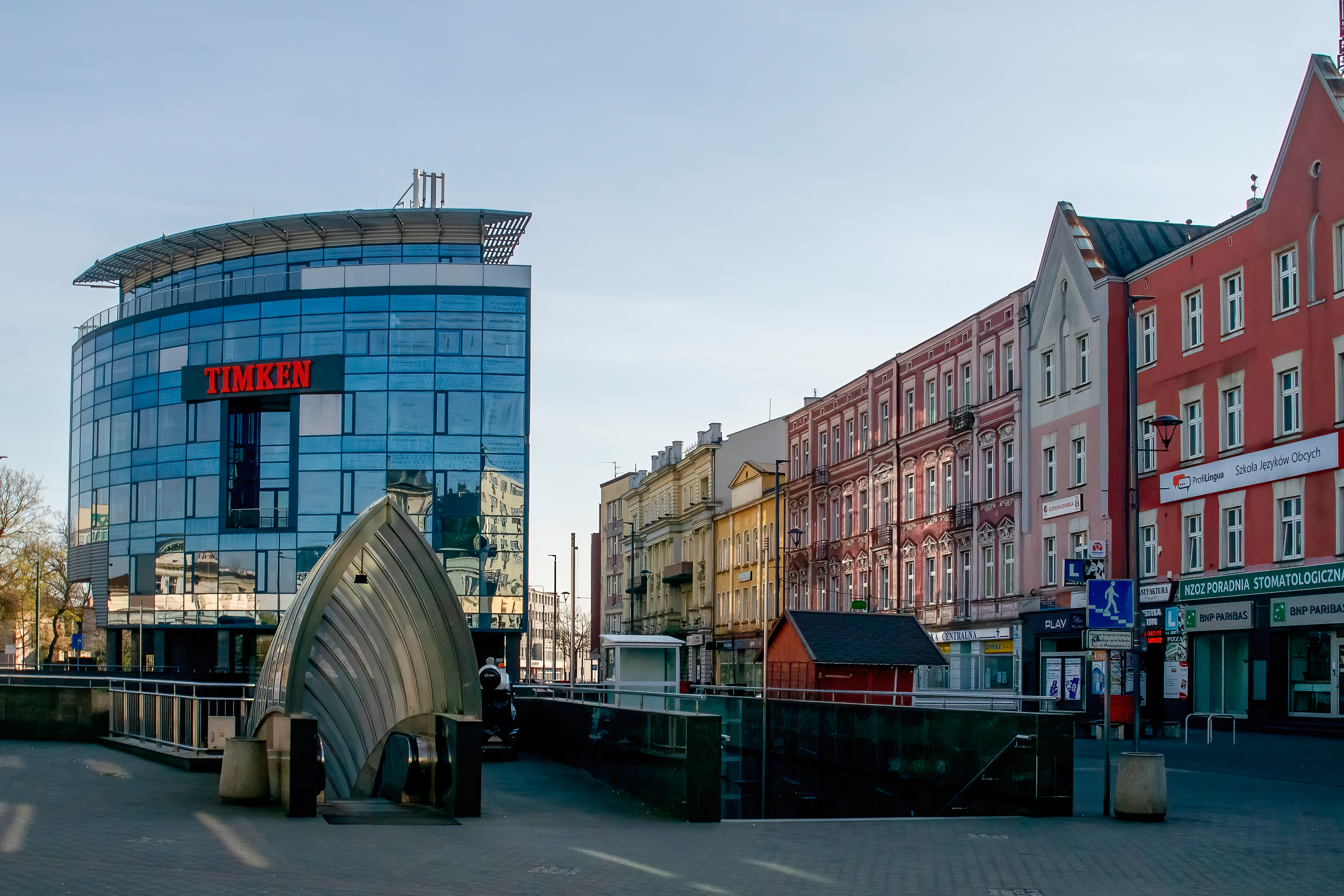
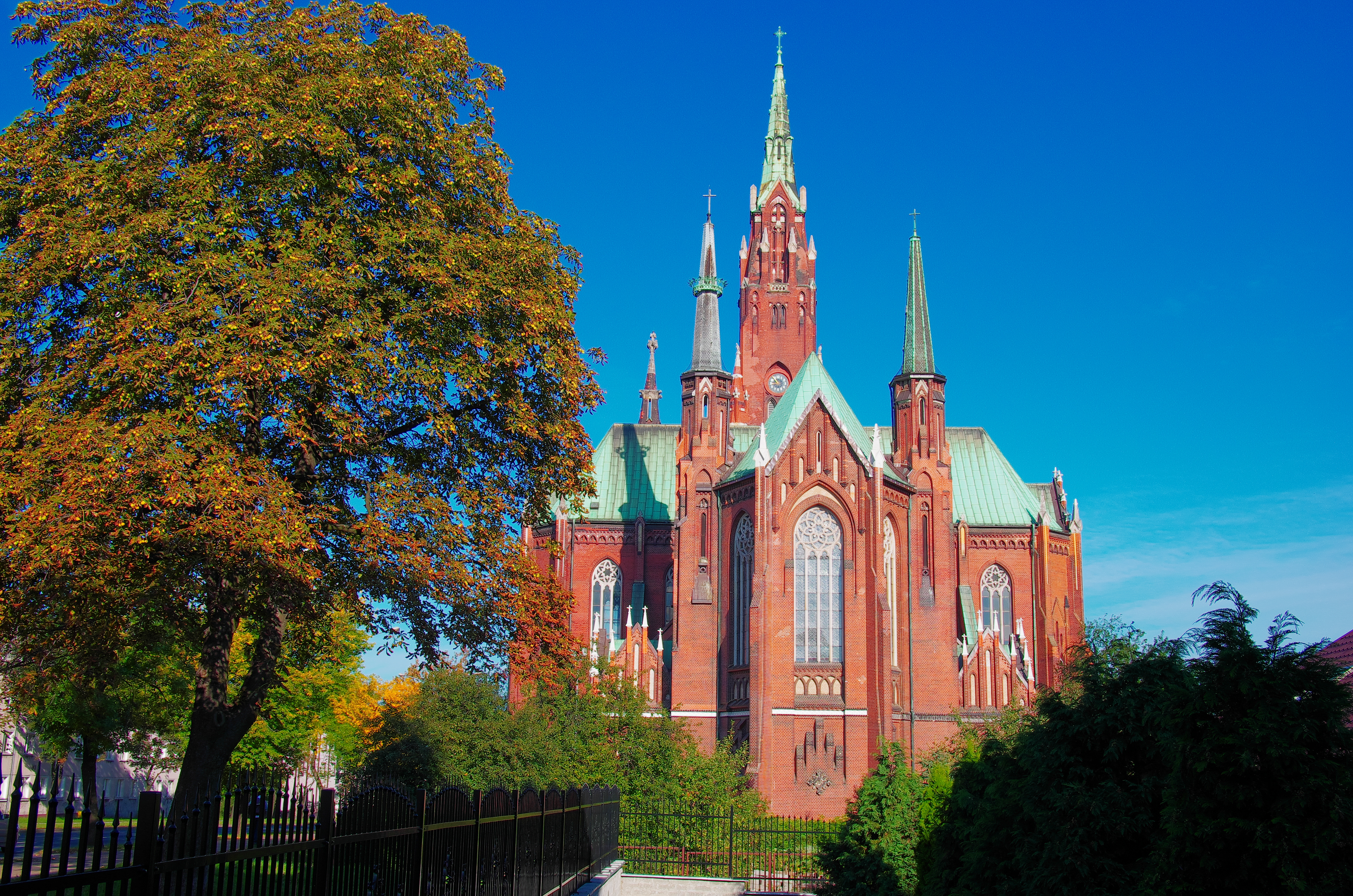
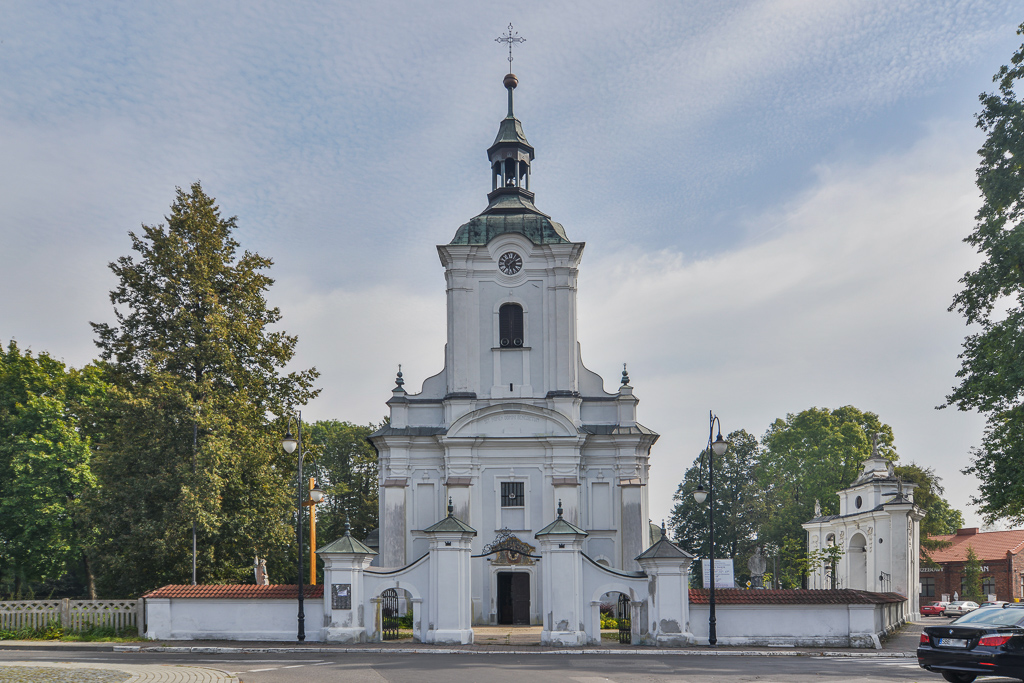
- From top, left to right: Będzin Castle; Sosnowiec city center; Saint Mary Basilica in Dąbrowa Górnicza; Church of Saint Matthias in Siewierz
- Interactive map of Dąbrowa Basin
- Country: Poland
- Historical region: Lesser Poland
- Largest city: Sosnowiec
- Time zone: UTC+1 (CET)
  - Summer (DST): UTC+2 (CEST)

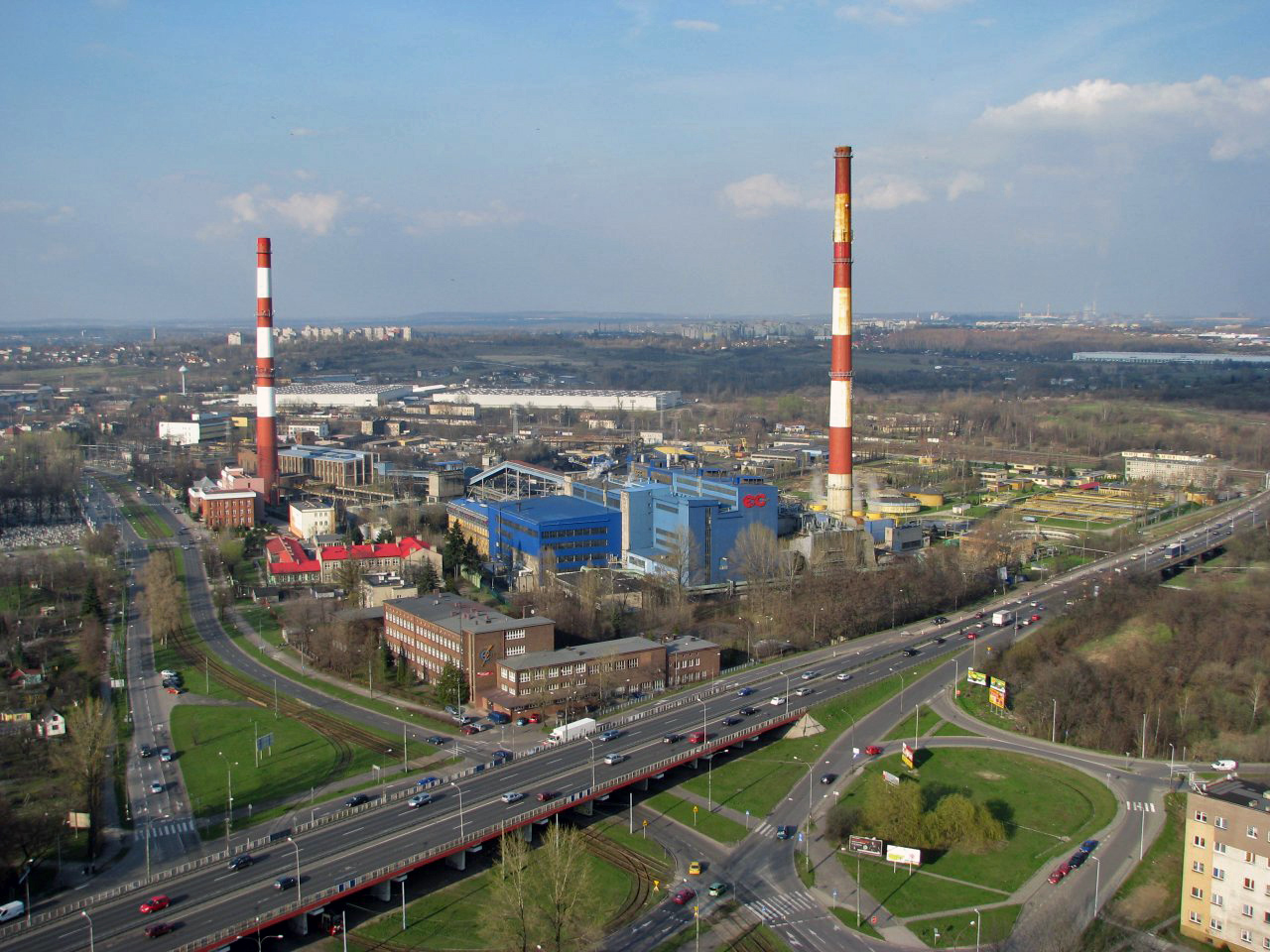
EC Będzin power-plant and panorama

The Dąbrowa Basin (also, Dąbrowa Coal Basin) or Zagłębie Dąbrowskie (Polish pronunciation: [zaˈɡwɛmbjɛ dɔmˈbrɔfskʲɛ]; is a geographical and historical region in southern Poland. It forms western part of Lesser Poland, though it shares some cultural and historical features with the neighbouring Upper Silesia. The region is sometimes referred to in English as Zaglembie or Zaglembia.

== Geography ==
Zagłębie is a highly industrialised and densely populated region of southern Lesser Poland, bordering Silesia through the Brynica river (running between Sosnowiec and Katowice). Apart from the three main cultural and industrial centres of the area (Dąbrowa Górnicza, Sosnowiec and Będzin), the region also includes a number of smaller cities. Among them are Czeladź, Wojkowice, Siewierz and Sławków, and also smaller villages: Psary, Ożarowice, Bobrowniki and Mierzęcice.

Since the borders of the region were never clearly defined, other towns are also sometimes listed among the cities of Zagłębie. These are: Zawiercie, Poręba, Włodowice, Kroczyce, Ogrodzieniec, Łazy and Olkusz.

== Name and district capital ==
The name Zagłębie Dąbrowskie was first used in ca. 1850, by Jozef Cieszkowski, a clerk employed at Western Coal District in Dąbrowa Górnicza. At that time, the town of Dąbrowa Górnicza was quickly growing, emerging as a main center of the region. The adjective "dąbrowskie" comes from the name of the town. The capital of the region has never been officially established. Sosnowiec is the largest city of Zagłębie, but Czeladź is the oldest.

== History ==
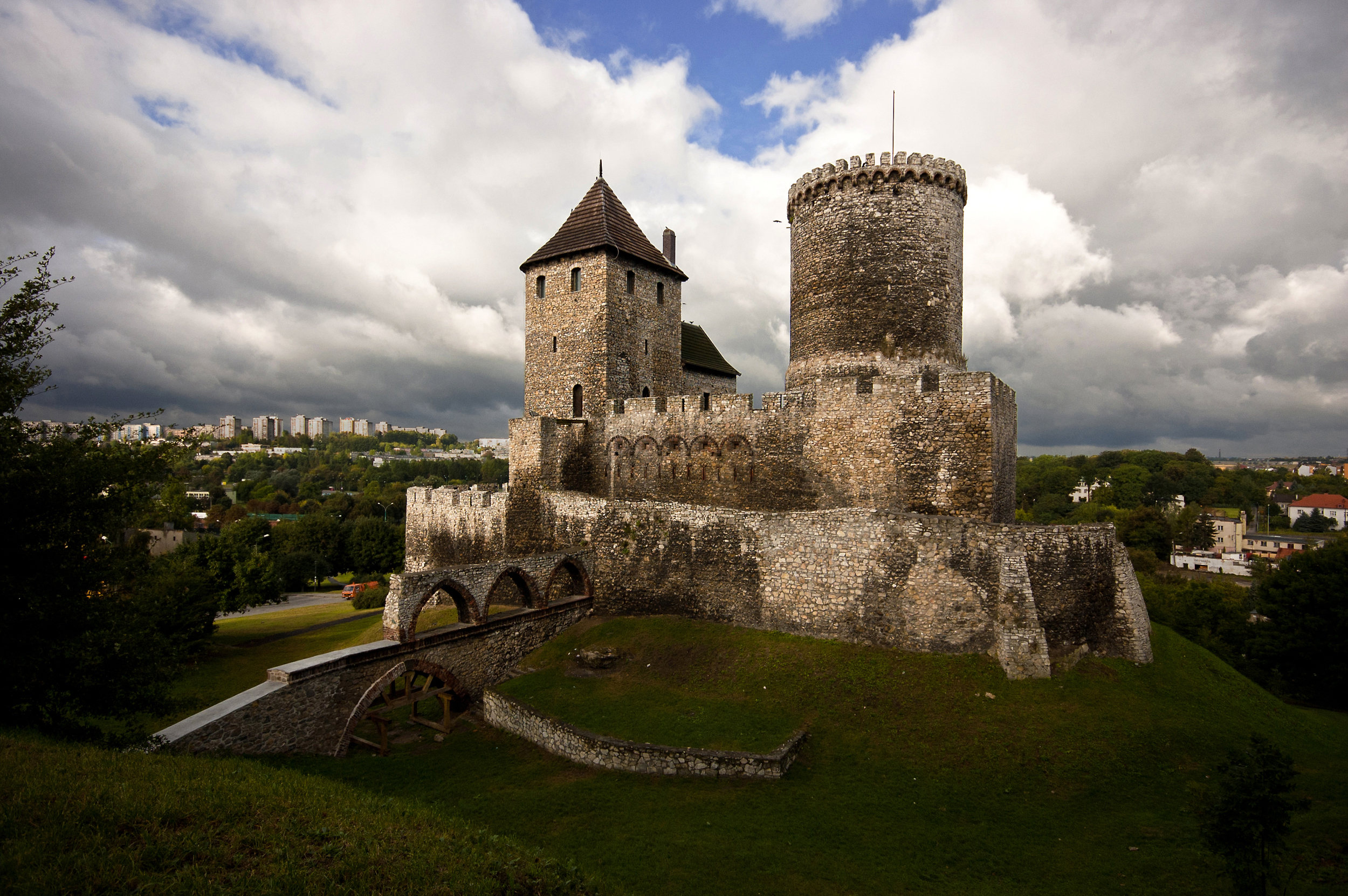
Defensive castle in Będzin from the Middle Ages

Until the 19th century, Zagłębie shared the fate of the rest of the region of Lesser Poland, and belonged to Kraków Voivodeship, with the exception of the Duchy of Siewierz, which between 1177 and 1443 was under the rule of Silesian dukes. On 30 December 1443, the Duchy was incorporated back into Lesser Poland as Polish fief and a property of the bishops of Kraków. After the Partitions of Poland, in 1795 Zagłębie was briefly annexed to the Prussian province of New Silesia. In 1807 however, during the Napoleonic Wars and the Polish–Austrian War, it was liberated and became part of the Duchy of Warsaw.

After the Congress of Vienna, along with the greater part of the Duchy, Zagłębie became part of the Russian-controlled Kingdom of Poland. Simultaneously, in both Upper Silesia and neighbouring Zagłębie, large deposits of coal were discovered. With the opening of the Warsaw–Vienna railway in 1848, the region became the most industrialised part of the Kingdom. Despite developing simultaneously with adjacent Silesia, the region remained outside of German influence and remained largely Polish, a fact that is still a source of a certain animosity between the Silesians and the Zagłębiacy, natives of Zagłębie. Zagłębie is sometimes called "Red", because of its Socialist or Communist traditions (it was one of main centers of the Revolution in the Kingdom of Poland (1905–07)), while Silesia is more conservative and religious.

After Poland regained her independence in 1918, Zagłębie became part of the Kielce Voivodeship. After World War II most of Zagłębie was attached to the Silesian Voivodeship, later Katowice Voivodeship and recently Silesian Voivodeship. On March 25, 1992, the Roman Catholic Diocese of Sosnowiec was created. It is called sometimes the Diocese of Zagłębie.

== Zagłębie dialect of the Polish language ==
Residents of the region spoke their own dialect, which now is largely extinct. It belonged to Lesser Poland group of dialects, with some Silesian and Russian additions (because Zagłębie in 1815–1915 was part of the Russian Empire). Several polonized words of Russian origin were in common use, such as "skolko" (standard Polish: "ile", English: "How much"), or "konfiety" (standard Polish: "cukierki", English: "sweets").

== Jews of Zagłębie ==
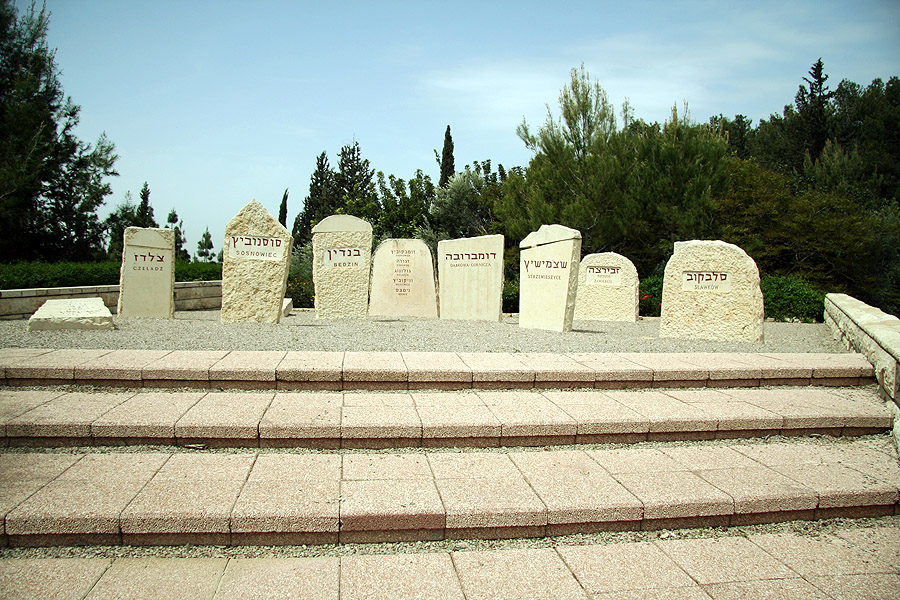
The memorial forest in memory of the Jews of Zagłębie, near the city of Modiin in Israel

At the start of World War II, 100,000 Jews lived in the area of Zagłębie. On August 12, 1942 all the Jews of the region were gathered together and after a selection process, 12,500 of them were deemed unfit for work and were sent to Auschwitz for immediate extermination. The rest of the Jews were sent to slave labor camps throughout the Nazi empire. A forest was planted in Israel near the city of Modiin in memory of the Jews of Zagłębie. The memorial plaque reads:

Tens of Jewish communities thrived and prospered throughout the Zagłęmbie region of south west Poland over the course of 700 years. The Jews of Zagłębie, who numbered 100,000 before the War, were destroyed by Nazi Germany. The Jews of Zagłęmbie resisted their Nazi enemies with honor and resourcefulness until death.

== See also ==
- Fridrich Kuczynski
