= The Holocaust =

Genocide of European Jews by Nazi Germany

- Part of the European theatre of World War II
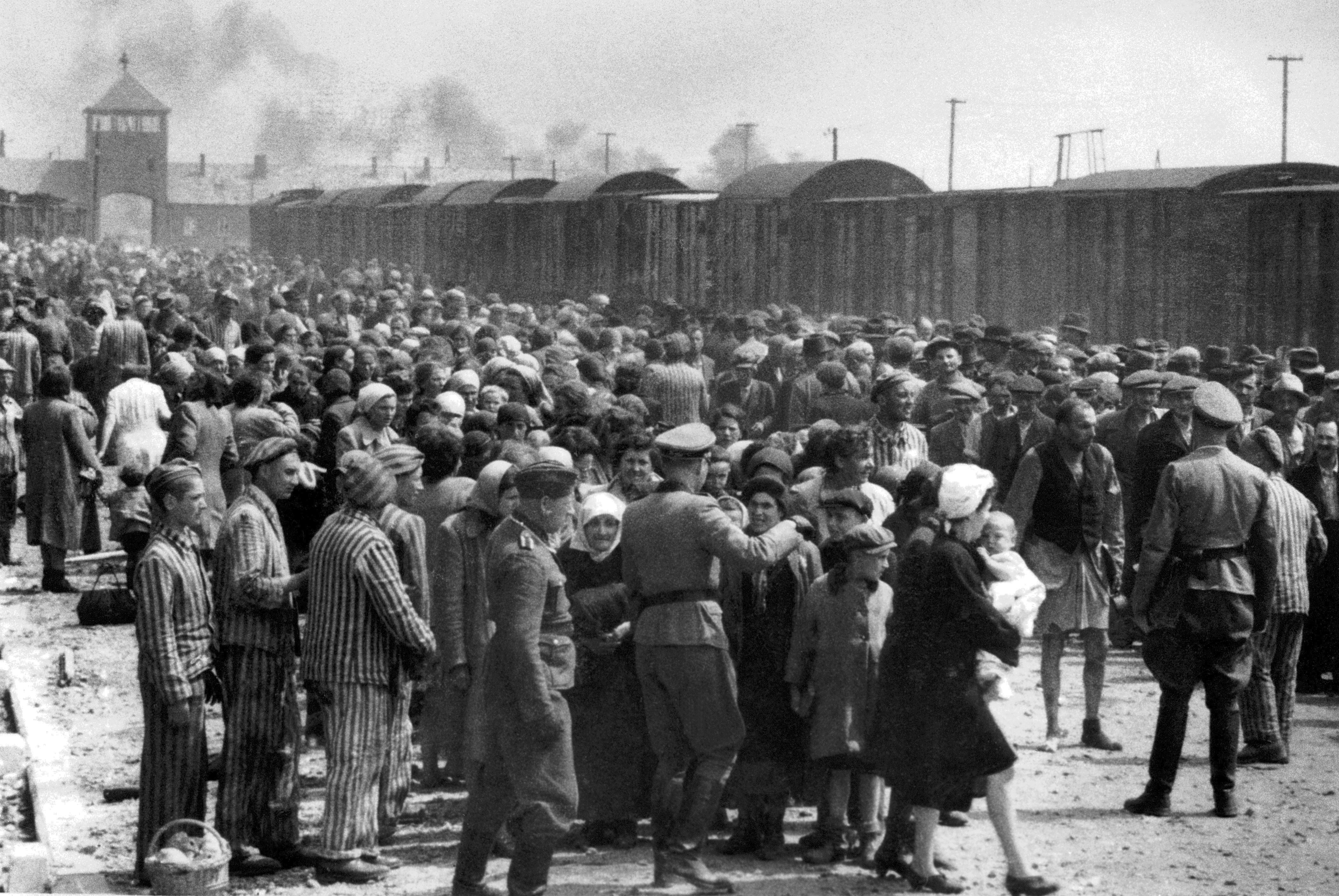
- Jews arriving at Auschwitz II in German-occupied Poland, May 1944. Most were selected for execution in gas chambers.
- Location: Europe, primarily German-occupied Poland and the Soviet Union
- Date: 1941–1945
- Attack type: Genocide, ethnic cleansing, mass murder, mass shooting, death marches, poison gas, hate crime, slavery
- Deaths: Around 6 million Jews (Note: Scholarly estimates fall in a range between 5.7 million and 6.2 million)
- Perpetrators: Nazi Germany along with its collaborators and allies: Schutzstaffel; Einsatzgruppen; Wehrmacht

The Holocaust, (Note: /ˈhɒləkɔːst/ HOL-ə-kawst)) known in Hebrew as the Shoah, (Note: /ˈʃoʊə/ SHOH-ə; Hebrew: שׁוֹאָה, romanized: Shoah, IPA: [ʃoˈʔa], lit. 'Catastrophe') was the genocide of European Jews during World War II. From 1941 to 1945, Nazi Germany and its collaborators systematically murdered around six million Jews across German-occupied Europe, approximately two-thirds of Europe's Jewish population. The murders were committed primarily through mass shootings across Eastern Europe and poison gas chambers in extermination camps, chiefly Auschwitz-Birkenau, Treblinka, Belzec, Sobibor, Chełmno and Majdanek death camps in occupied Poland. Concurrent Nazi persecutions killed millions of other non-Jewish civilians and prisoners of war (POWs); the term Holocaust is sometimes used to include the murder and persecution of non-Jewish groups, such as the Romani and Soviet POWs.

The Nazis developed their ideology based on racism and pursuit of "living space", and seized power in early 1933. Meant to force all German Jews to emigrate, regardless of means, the regime passed anti-Jewish laws, encouraged violence, and orchestrated a nationwide pogrom known as Kristallnacht in November 1938. After Germany's invasion of Poland in September 1939, occupation authorities began to establish ghettos to segregate Jews. Following the June 1941 invasion of the Soviet Union, 1.5 to 2 million Jews were murdered by German forces and local collaborators. The Nazis first targeted Jewish Red Army POWs and male civilians, but quickly escalated to murdering Jewish women and children.

By early 1942, following the Wannsee Conference presided by Reinhard Heydrich, the Nazis' Final Solution was implemented to murder all Jews in Europe. Some historians note that Adolf Hitler frequently communicated major policy decisions verbally to Heinrich Himmler rather than through written directives. Victims were deported to extermination camps where those who had survived the trip were gassed, while others were sent to forced labor camps where many died from starvation, abuse, exhaustion, or being used as test subjects in experiments. Property belonging to murdered Jews was redistributed to the German occupiers and other non-Jews. The murder rate was most intense during Operation Reinhard from March 1942 to November 1943. Although the majority of Holocaust victims died in 1942, the mass murders continued until the end of the war in 1945.

Many Jewish survivors emigrated from Europe after the war. Relatively few Holocaust perpetrators faced criminal trials. Billions of dollars in reparations have been paid, although falling short of the losses suffered by the European Jews. The Holocaust has also been commemorated in museums, memorials, and culture. It is considered to be the single deadliest genocide in human history, and has become central to Western historical consciousness as a symbol of the ultimate human evil.

== Terminology and scope ==
The term holocaust, derived from a Greek word meaning 'burnt offering', was an ordinary English word for centuries also meaning 'destruction or sacrifice by fire' or, figuratively, 'massacre'. During the 1950s, it started to become a proper noun and the most common word used to describe the Nazi extermination of Jews in English and many other languages. (Note: Bartov 2023a, pp. 18–19: "Much of this debate curiously boils down to a very specific historical question, namely, did the Nazis target the Jews for genocide in a manner that was essentially different from their treatment of any other group under their rule? ... There can be little doubt that the Jews played a singular role in the Nazi imaginaire and that German Jewish policies distinguished them within the Nazi universe of murder and fantasy; but other groups clearly have been similarly targeted in other genocides ... 'the extent of the 'final solution' was ... shaped by an antisemitism that was colored by a different element over and above the racism and ethno-nationalism that explains the murder of other groups by Nazi Germany—that element being the view of 'the Jews' as an implacable, collective world enemy.' To be sure, this makes the Holocaust unique only within the context of the Nazi empire ...." Smith 2023, p. 36: "The Holocaust is particular to Jews and yet has had increasing relevance for those who do not identify as Jewish. ... All Jews everywhere were to be murdered because of their racial heritage was 'put into state policy' on January 20, 1942 at the Wannsee conference.... Witness to the genocide of the Jews is a uniquely Jewish experience, because only Jews were targeted by that policy, even if other groups were targeted for genocide under other policies. The Nazi regime committed genocide against the Roma and Sinti, governed by separate policies. They also committed war crimes against Soviet Prisoners of War under other policies. So too the mass murder of disabled and the mentally ill had their own policies. The Nazis committed multiple genocides and crimes against humanity, at the same time, sometimes in the same place, governed by different laws, policies, and practices. It is not correct to say that there were many victim types during 'the Holocaust,' if by 'the Holocaust' we mean the genocide of the Jews." Stone 2023, "Introduction: What is the Holocaust?": "This is why the focus here is on the Jews. Roma, the disabled, Soviet POWs, homosexuals and other groups were victims of the Nazis, and it is entirely legitimate to study their fate alongside one another. But using the term 'Holocaust' to encompass all of these groups with the aim of being inclusive and not prioritizing one group's suffering, actually does a disservice to groups other than Jews. For the Nazis persecuted these groups for different reasons, reasons we fail to appreciate if we collapse them all together." Engel 2021, pp. 3, 5: "This book is about an encounter between two sets of human beings: on one hand, the people who acted on behalf of the German state, its agencies, or its almost 66 million citizens between 30 January 1933 and 8 May 1945; on the other, the more than 9 million Jews ...." And: "Those discoveries about the encounter between the Third Reich and the Jews made that encounter stand out in the minds of many from other instances of Nazi persecution and encouraged observers to assign it its own special name." Jackson 2021, pp. 199–200: "The Nazis killed some people almost exclusively due to their supposed genetic inferiority (the mentally and physically handicapped, Slavs, Roma); they killed others almost exclusively due to their perceived cultural decadence (communists, democrats, modernist authors and artists); but only the Jews were indicted on both grounds simultaneously and with equal vigor. ... This is not to say that Roma, communists, and others were not hated and murdered by the Nazis, but it is to note that the Jews were unique in being despised and assaulted in every dimension of their identity, corporeal and psychic." Sahlstrom 2021, p. 291: "the established understanding of the Holocaust today as the genocide of six million Jews". Bartrop 2019, p. 50: "it must always be remembered that the Holocaust was a premeditated action by the Nazis to permanently eradicate a Jewish presence in Europe. Others—the disabled, Roma, Poles and other Slavs, Jehovah's Witnesses, homosexuals, dissenting clergy, communists, socialists, 'asocials,' and political opponents of all sorts—were also persecuted and in many cases murdered in huge numbers; however, it was the campaign against the Jews that was the ideological 'ground zero' for Nazi racial ideology. Others besides Jews were murdered, often on a genocidal scale, and should be remembered and acknowledged: but it was only the Jews who were all to be killed as part of a calculated policy of genocide." Beorn 2018, p. 4: "I will use the term 'Holocaust' to refer mainly to the Nazi attempt to murder the Jews of Europe; however, I will also use the more inclusive term 'Nazi genocidal project' to capture the larger murderous vision of which the Jews were such a large part. This includes Sinti/Roma (gypsies), the handicapped, political 'enemies,' Soviet prisoners of war, and—particularly in the East—entire ethnic groups such as the Slavs. One cannot understand the Holocaust in Eastern Europe without placing it in the context of this larger Nazi genocidal project that foresaw murder and demographic engineering on a colossal scale." Cesarani 2016, p. xxxix: "This book deals with the fate of the Jews, not of 'other victims' of Nazi political repression and racial-biological policies. Several other groups endured social exclusion, incarceration in concentration camps, and mass murder. However, the rationale for the persecution of these groups differed radically from the intentions that underlay anti-Jewish policy. Even though homosexual men and women, Germans of African descent, and the severely mentally and physically disabled were all disparaged in Nazi racial thinking, and depicted as a threat to the strength and purity of the Volk, only the Jews were characterized as an implacable, powerful, global enemy that had to be fought at every turn and finally eliminated." Hayes 2015, p. xiii: "This book also reflects another of its editor's convictions: the Holocaust was National Socialist Germany's assault on the Jews of Europe. Nazism attacked many groups, but none for the same reason that it attacked the Jews, none with the same urgency, and none to the same extent." Hayes & Roth 2010, p. 2: "Other groups—for example, Sinti and Roma, homosexuals, and Slavs—were swept up in the maelstrom of the Holocaust, but not for the same reasons as Jews and not with the same consequences .... In none of these cases, however, was the target group considered dangerous or coherent enough to warrant complete or immediate extirpation. This circumstance constitutes a significant difference from policies pursued toward the Jews, a difference that helps to clarify and define the Holocaust itself." Stone 2010, pp. 1–2: "For the purpose of this book, the Holocaust is understood as the genocide of the Jews .... 'Holocaust', then, refers to the genocide of the Jews, which by no means excludes an understanding that other groups—notably Romanies and Slavs—were victims of genocide." Bloxham 2009, p. 1: "Between 5,100,000 and 6,200,000 Jews were murdered during the Second World War, an episode the Nazis called the 'final solution of the Jewish question'. The world today knows it as the Holocaust." Niewyk & Nicosia 2000, pp. 45, 51: "The Holocaust is commonly defined as the mass murder of more than 5,000,000 Jews by the Germans during World War II. Not everyone finds this a fully satisfactory definition." And: "the traditional view that it was the genocide of the Jews alone") The term Holocaust is sometimes used to refer to the persecution of other groups that the Nazis targeted, (Note: King 2023, pp. 26–27: "Rather than one big thing, the Holocaust might now be described as an array of event categories. In Christopher Browning's terms, the Holocaust involved three separate "clusters of genocidal projects": euthanasia and "racial purification" directed against the disabled and Sinti and Roma (at the time referred to collectively as "Gypsies") within the Third Reich; the eradication of Slavic populations living in countries east of Germany; and the Final Solution proper—that is, the attempted mass murder of every Jew residing anywhere within Germany's sphere of influence (Browning 2010, 407). (The list of persecuted categories—people targeted by the Nazis in ways short of genocide—would of course be longer.)" Engel 2021, p. 6: "Echoing this view, some have contended that the expression 'the Holocaust' ought to refer not only to the encounter between the Third Reich and the Jews but also to 'the horrors that Poles, other Slavs, and Gypsies endured at the hands of the Nazis' (Lukas, 1986: 220). Others have extended the term to encompass the Third Reich's treatment of homosexuals, the mentally ill or infrm, and Jehovah's Witnesses, speaking of 11 or 12 million victims of the Holocaust, half of whom were Jews. Still others have employed the word 'holocaust' also when referring to cases of mass murder not perpetrated by the Third Reich." Kay 2021, pp. 1–2: "For perhaps the first time, all major victim groups where the death tolls reached at least into the tens of thousands will be considered together: Jewish and non-Jewish .... [I]t makes a great deal of sense to consider the different strands of Nazi mass killing together rather than in isolation from one another. This of course means going against the grain of most scholarship on the subject by examining the genocide of the European Jews alongside other Nazi mass-murder campaigns." Gerlach 2016, pp. 14–15: "There are a number of words I will try to avoid because of the serious misconceptions they might lead to. The terms Holocaust and Shoah are not useful since neither has any analytical value. 'Holocaust' (derived from the Greek holókauton, or 'burned sacrifice') has a religious connotation unbefitting of the event it is supposed to refer to, and users of this term may mean by it either the persecution and murder of Jews alone, or Nazi German violence against any group more generally .... Importantly, Holocaust and Shoah have also been criticized as 'teleological and anachronistic' terms that convey a retrospective view that makes complex processes appear 'as a single event.'" Niewyk & Nicosia 2000, p. 51: "The authors of this volume have adopted the third approach to a working definition: The Holocaust—that is, Nazi genocide—was the systematic, state-sponsored murder of entire groups determined by heredity. This applied to Jews, Gypsies, and the handicapped. This section also makes it clear that other definitions are defended by scholars who deserve a respectful hearing.") especially those targeted on a biological basis, in particular the Roma and Sinti, as well as Soviet prisoners of war and Polish and Soviet civilians. All of these groups, however, were targeted for different reasons. By the 1970s, the adjective Jewish was dropped as redundant and Holocaust, now capitalized, became the default term for the destruction of European Jews. The Hebrew word Shoah ('catastrophic destruction') exclusively refers to Jewish victims. The perpetrators used the phrase "Final Solution" as a euphemism for their genocide of Jews.

== Background ==
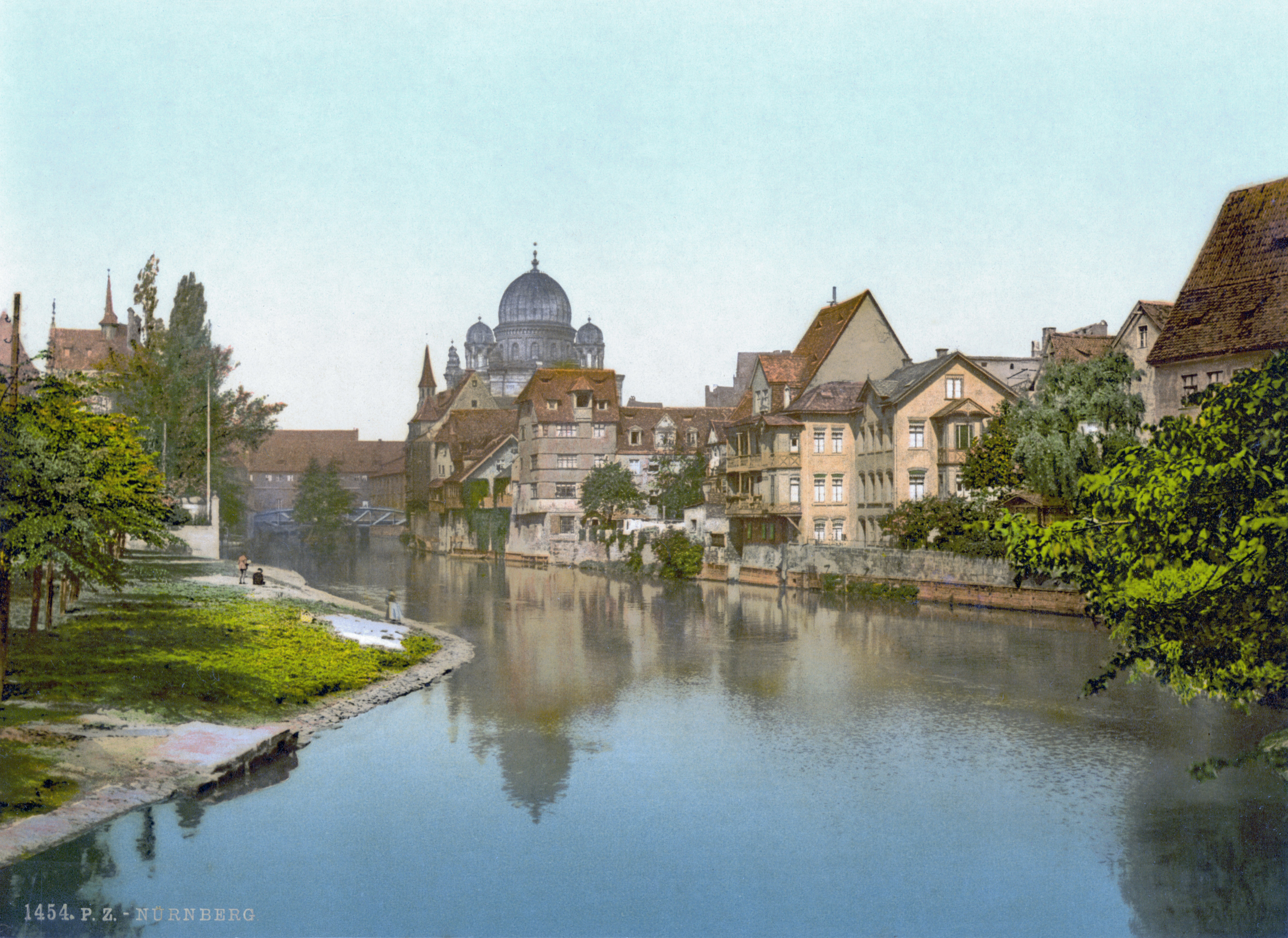
View of the Pegnitz River (c. 1900) with the Grand Synagogue of Nuremberg, destroyed in 1938 during the November pogroms

Jews have lived in Europe for more than two thousand years. Throughout the Middle Ages in Europe, Jews were subjected to antisemitism based on Christian theology, which blamed them for killing Jesus. In the 19th century many European countries granted full citizenship rights to Jews in hopes that they would assimilate. By the early 20th century, most Jews in central and western Europe were well integrated into society, while in eastern Europe, where emancipation had arrived later, many Jews continued to live in small towns, spoke Yiddish, and practiced Orthodox Judaism. Political antisemitism positing the existence of a Jewish question and usually an international Jewish conspiracy emerged in the 18th and 19th centuries due to the rise of nationalism in Europe and industrialization that increased economic conflicts between Jews and non-Jews. Some scientists began to categorize humans into different races and argued that there was a life or death struggle between them. Many racists argued that Jews were a separate racial group alien to Europe.

The turn of the twentieth century saw a major effort to establish a German colonial empire overseas, leading to the Herero and Nama genocide and subsequent racial apartheid regime in South West Africa. World War I (1914–1918) intensified nationalist and racist sentiments in Germany and other European countries. Jews in eastern Europe were targeted by widespread pogroms. Germany had two million war dead and lost substantial territory; opposition to the postwar settlement united Germans across the political spectrum. The military promoted the untrue but compelling idea that, rather than being defeated on the battlefield, Germany had been stabbed in the back by socialists and Jews.

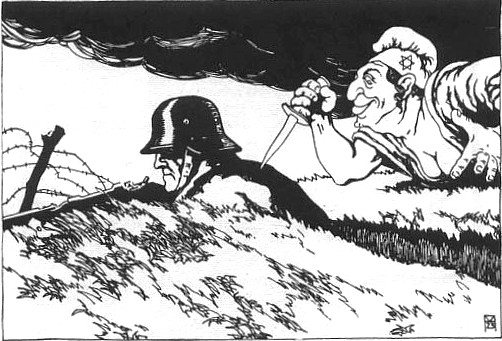
1919 Austrian postcard showing a Jew stabbing a German Army soldier in the back

The Nazi Party was founded in the wake of the war, and its ideology is often cited as the main factor explaining the Holocaust. From the beginning, the Nazis—not unlike other nation-states in Europe—dreamed of a world without Jews, whom they identified as "the embodiment of everything that was wrong with modernity". The Nazis defined the German nation as a racial community unbounded by Germany's physical borders and sought to purge it of racially foreign and socially deficient elements. The Nazi Party and its leader, Adolf Hitler, were also obsessed with reversing Germany's territorial losses and acquiring additional Lebensraum (living space) in Eastern Europe for colonization. These ideas appealed to many Germans. The Nazis promised to protect European civilization from the Soviet threat. Hitler believed that Jews controlled the Soviet Union, as well as the Western powers, and were plotting to destroy Germany.

== Rise of Nazi Germany ==
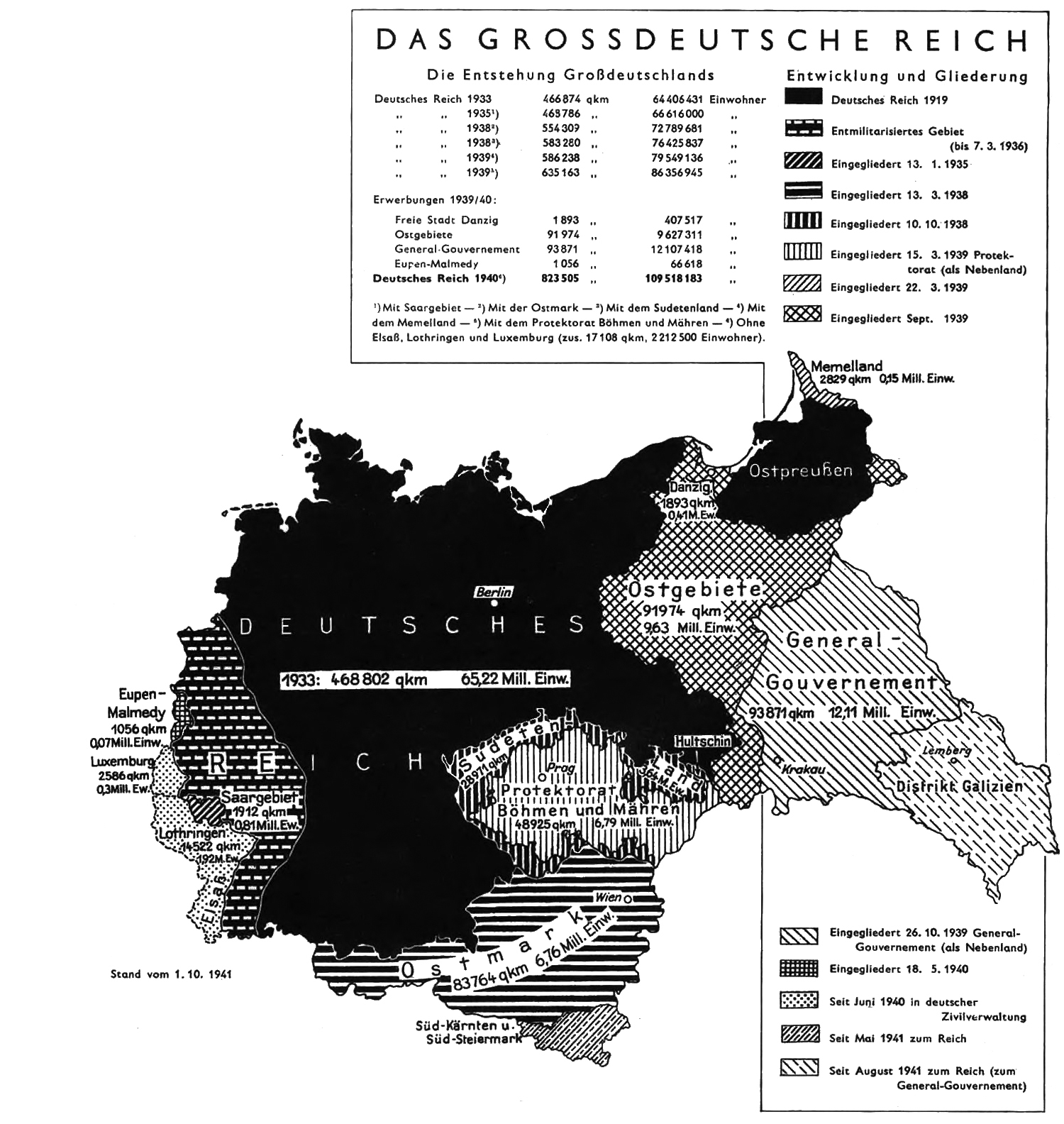
Territorial expansion of Germany from 1933 to 1941

Amidst a worldwide economic depression and political fragmentation, the Nazi Party rapidly increased its support, reaching a high of 37 percent in mid-1932 elections, by campaigning on issues such as anticommunism and economic recovery. Hitler was appointed chancellor in January 1933 in a backroom deal supported by right-wing politicians. Within months, all other political parties were banned, the regime seized control of the media, tens of thousands of political opponents—especially communists—were arrested, and a system of camps for extrajudicial imprisonment was set up. The Nazi regime cracked down on crime and social outsiders—such as Roma and Sinti, homosexual men, and those perceived as workshy—through a variety of measures, including imprisonment in concentration camps. The Nazis forcibly sterilized 400,000 people and subjected others to forced abortions for real or supposed hereditary illnesses.

Although the Nazis sought to control every aspect of public and private life, Nazi repression was directed almost entirely against groups perceived as outside the national community. Most Germans had little to fear provided they did not oppose the new regime. The new regime built popular support through economic growth, which partly occurred through state-led measures such as rearmament. The annexations of Austria (1938), Sudetenland (1938), and Bohemia and Moravia (1939) also increased the Nazis' popular support. Germans were inundated with propaganda both against Jews and other groups targeted by the Nazis.

=== Persecution of Jews ===
The roughly 500,000 German Jews made up less than 1 percent of the country's population in 1933. They were wealthier on average than other Germans and largely assimilated, although a minority were recent immigrants from eastern Europe. Various German government agencies, Nazi Party organizations, and local authorities instituted about 1,500 anti-Jewish laws. In 1933, Jews were banned or restricted from several professions and the civil service. After hounding the German Jews out of public life by the end of 1934, the regime passed the Nuremberg Laws in 1935. The laws reserved full citizenship rights for those of "German or related blood", restricted Jews' economic activity, and criminalized new marriages and sexual relationships between Jews and non-Jewish Germans. Jews were defined as those with three or four Jewish grandparents; many of those with partial Jewish descent were classified as Mischlinge, with varying rights. The regime also sought to segregate Jews with a view to their ultimate disappearance from the country. Jewish students were gradually forced out of the school system. Some municipalities enacted restrictions governing where Jews were allowed to live or conduct business. In 1938 and 1939, Jews were barred from additional occupations, and their businesses were expropriated to force them out of the economy.

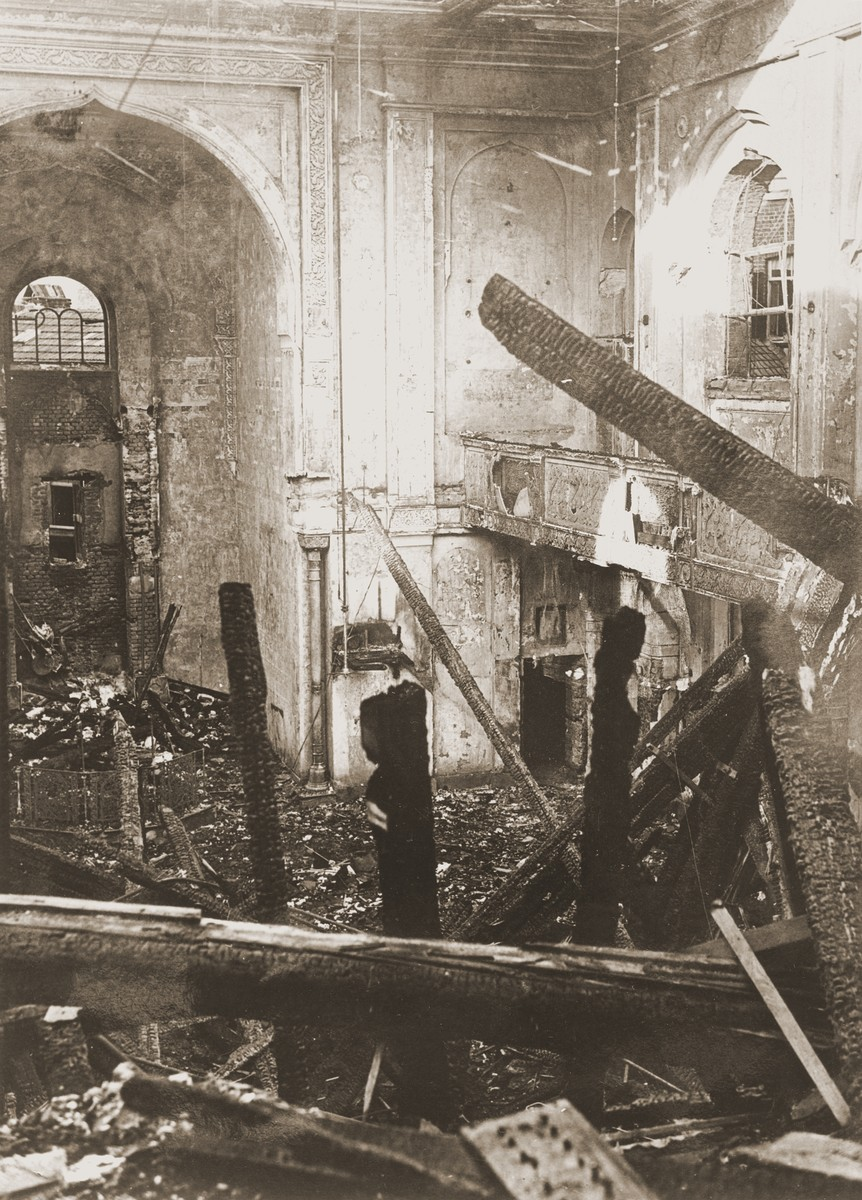
View of the old synagogue in Aachen after its destruction during Kristallnacht

Anti-Jewish violence, largely locally organized by members of Nazi Party institutions, took primarily non-lethal forms from 1933 to 1939. Jewish stores, especially in rural areas, were often boycotted or vandalized. As a result of local and popular pressure, many small towns became entirely free of Jews and as many as a third of Jewish businesses may have been forced to close. Anti-Jewish violence was even worse in areas annexed by Nazi Germany. On 9–10 November 1938, the Nazis organized Kristallnacht (Night of Broken Glass), a nationwide pogrom. Over 7,500 Jewish shops (out of 9,000) were looted, more than 1,000 synagogues were damaged or destroyed, at least 90 Jews were murdered, and as many as 30,000 Jewish men were arrested, although many were released within weeks. German Jews were levied a special tax that raised more than 1 billion Reichsmarks (RM). (Note: Equivalent to $400 million at the time, or $8 billion in 2025.)

The Nazi government wanted to force all Jews to leave Germany. Out of the 560,000 Jews in the country, 130,000 were able to emigrate between 1933 and 1937, most of them towards South Africa, Mandatory Palestine, and South America. Some went back to Eastern Europe. Another 120,000 left Germany in 1938 and 1939. Almost no country lowered the restrictions to immigrate, so obtaining the necessary documents was difficult. By the end of 1939, most Jews who could emigrate had already done so; those who remained behind were disproportionately elderly, poor, or female. Until 1939 100,000 were in USA; 50,000 each in Palestine, UK, Argentina; 30,000 each in the Netherlands, Belgium, France, South Africa, and Shanghai. Germany collected emigration taxes of nearly 1 billion RM, mostly from Jews. The policy of forced emigration continued into 1940.

Besides Germany, a significant number of other European countries abandoned democracy for some kind of authoritarian or fascist rule. Many countries, including Bulgaria, Hungary, Poland, Romania, and Slovakia, passed antisemitic legislation in the 1930s and 1940s. In October 1938, Germany deported many Polish Jews in response to a Polish law that enabled the revocation of citizenship for Polish Jews living abroad.

== Start of World War II ==
The German Wehrmacht (armed forces) invaded Poland on 1 September 1939, triggering declarations of war from the United Kingdom and France. During the five weeks of fighting, as many as 16,000 civilians, hostages, and prisoners of war may have been shot by the German invaders; there was also a great deal of looting. Special units known as Einsatzgruppen followed the army to eliminate any possible resistance. Around 50,000 Polish and Polish Jewish leaders and intellectuals were arrested or executed. The Auschwitz concentration camp was established to hold those members of the Polish intelligentsia not killed in the purges. Around 400,000 Poles were expelled from the Wartheland in western Poland to the General Governorate occupation zone from 1939 to 1941, and the area was resettled by ethnic Germans from eastern Europe.

The rest of Poland was occupied by the Soviet Union, which invaded Poland from the east on 17 September pursuant to the German–Soviet pact. The Soviet Union deported hundreds of thousands of Polish citizens to the Soviet interior, including as many as 260,000 Jews who largely survived the war. Although most Jews were not communists, some accepted positions in the Soviet administration, contributing to a pre-existing perception among many non-Jews that Soviet rule was a Jewish conspiracy. In 1940, Germany invaded much of western Europe including the Netherlands, Belgium, Luxembourg, France, and Denmark and Norway. In 1941, Germany invaded Yugoslavia and Greece. Some of these new holdings were fully or partially annexed into Germany while others were placed under civilian or military rule.

The war provided cover for "Aktion T4", the murder of around 70,000 institutionalized Germans with mental or physical disabilities at specialized killing centers using poison gas. The victims included all 4,000 to 5,000 institutionalized Jews. Despite efforts to maintain secrecy, knowledge of the killings leaked out and Hitler ordered a halt to the centralized killing program in August 1941. Decentralized killings via denial of medical care, starvation, and poisoning caused an additional 120,000 deaths by the end of the war. Many of the same personnel and technologies were later used for the mass murder of Jews.

=== Ghettoization and resettlement ===
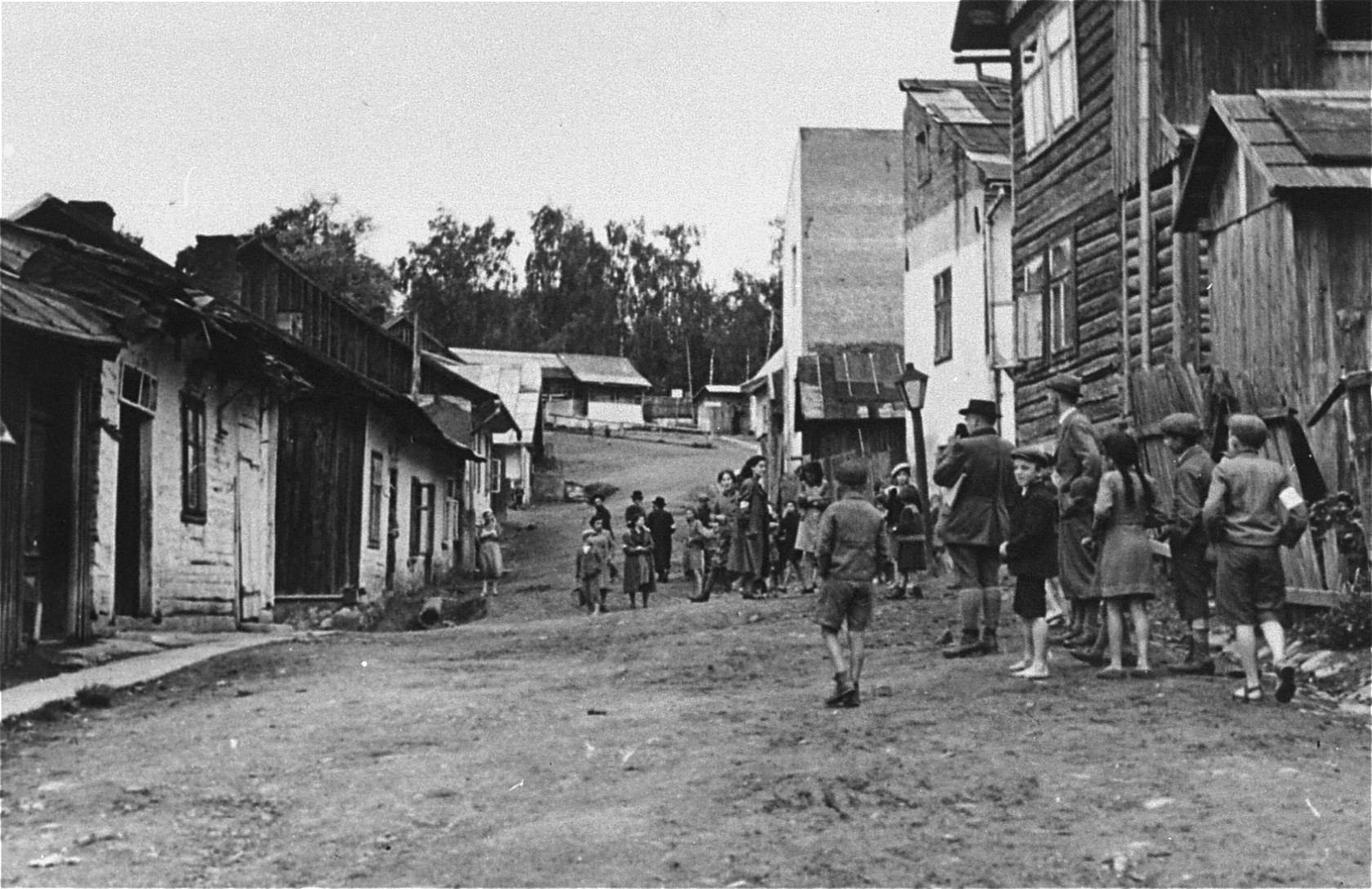
Unpaved street in the Frysztak Ghetto, Krakow District

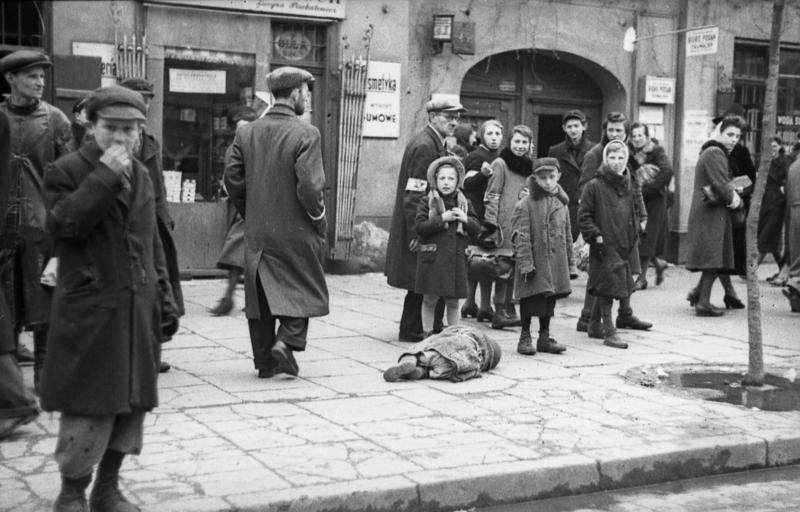
A body lying in the street of the Warsaw Ghetto in the General Governorate

Germany gained control of 1.7 million Jews in Poland. The Nazis tried to concentrate Jews in the Lublin District of the General Governorate. 45,000 Jews were deported by November and left to fend for themselves, causing many deaths. Deportations stopped in early 1940 due to the opposition of Hans Frank, the leader of the General Governorate, who did not want his fiefdom to become a dumping ground for unwanted Jews. After the conquest of France, the Nazis considered deporting Jews to French Madagascar, but this proved impossible. The Nazis planned that harsh conditions in these areas would kill many Jews. In September 1939, around 7,000 Jews were killed, alongside thousands of Poles, however, they were not systematically targeted as they would be later, and open mass killings would subside until June 1941.

During the invasion, synagogues were burned and thousands of Jews fled or were expelled into the Soviet occupation zone. Various anti-Jewish regulations were soon issued. In October 1939, adult Jews in the General Governorate were required to perform forced labor. In November 1939 they were ordered to wear white armbands. Laws decreed the seizure of most Jewish property and the takeover of Jewish-owned businesses. When Jews were forced into ghettos, they lost their homes and belongings.

The first Nazi ghettos were established in the Wartheland and General Governorate in 1939 and 1940 on the initiative of local German administrators. The largest ghettos, such as Warsaw and Łódź, were established in existing residential neighborhoods and closed by fences or walls. In many smaller ghettos, Jews were forced into poor neighborhoods but with no fence. Forced labor programs provided subsistence to many ghetto inhabitants, and in some cases protected them from deportation. Workshops and factories were operated inside some ghettos, while in other cases Jews left the ghetto to work outside it. Because the ghettos were not segregated by sex some family life continued. A Jewish community leadership (Judenrat) exercised some authority and tried to sustain the Jewish community while following German demands. As a survival strategy, many tried to make the ghettos useful to the occupiers as a labor reserve. Jews in western Europe were not forced into ghettos but faced discriminatory laws and confiscation of property.

Rape and sexual exploitation of Jewish and non-Jewish women in eastern Europe was common.

=== Invasion of the Soviet Union ===
Germany and its allies Slovakia, Hungary, Romania, and Italy invaded the Soviet Union on 22 June 1941. Although the war was launched more for strategic than ideological reasons, what Hitler saw as an apocalyptic battle against the forces of Jewish Bolshevism was to be carried out as a war of extermination with complete disregard for the laws and customs of war. A quick victory was expected and was planned to be followed by a massive demographic engineering project to remove 31 million people and replace them with German settlers. To increase the speed of conquest the Germans planned to feed their army by looting, exporting additional food to Germany, and to terrorize the local inhabitants with preventative killings. The Germans foresaw that the invasion would cause a food shortfall and planned the mass starvation of Soviet cities and some rural areas. Although the starvation policy was less successful than planners hoped, the residents of some cities, particularly in Ukraine, and besieged Leningrad, as well as the Jewish ghettos, endured human-made famine, during which millions of people died of starvation.

By mid-June 1941, about 30,000 Jews had died, 20,000 of whom had starved to death in the ghettos.

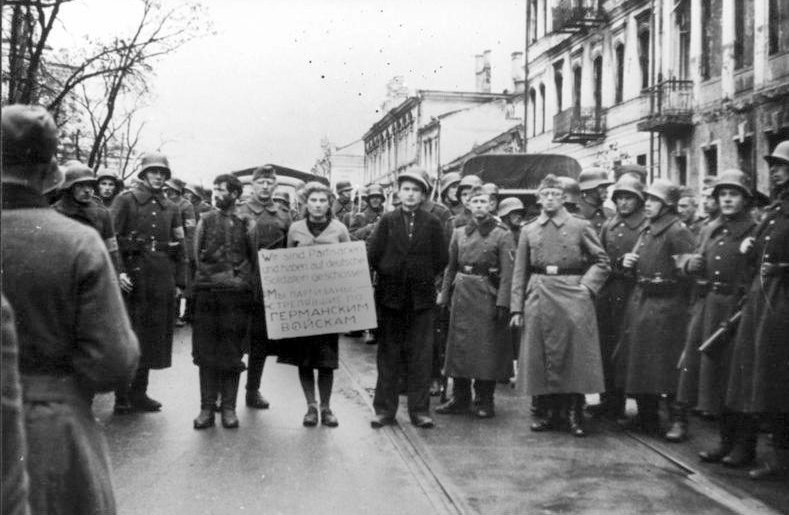
Public execution of Masha Bruskina, a Belarusian Jew who helped Soviet prisoners escape

Soviet prisoners of war in the custody of the German Army were intended to die in large numbers. Sixty percent—3.3 million people—died, primarily of starvation, making them the second largest group of victims of Nazi mass killing after European Jews. Jewish prisoners of war and commissars were systematically executed. About a million civilians were killed by the Nazis during anti-partisan warfare, including more than 300,000 in Belarus. From 1942 onwards, the Germans and their allies targeted villages suspected of supporting the partisans, burning them and killing or expelling their inhabitants. During these operations, nearby small ghettos were liquidated and their inhabitants shot. By 1943, anti-partisan operations aimed for the depopulation of large areas of Belarus. Jews and those unfit for work were typically shot on the spot with others deported. Although most of those killed were not Jews, anti-partisan warfare often led to the deaths of Jews.

== Mass murder ==
Most historians agree that Hitler issued an explicit order to kill all Jews across Europe, but there is disagreement as to when. Some historians cite inflammatory statements by Hitler and other Nazi leaders as well as the concurrent mass shootings of Serbian Jews, plans for extermination camps in Poland, and the beginning of the deportation of German Jews as indicative of the final decision having been made before December 1941. Others argue that these policies were initiatives by local leaders and that the final decision was made later. On 5 December 1941, the Soviet Union launched its first major counteroffensive. On 11 December, Hitler declared war on the United States after Japan attacked Pearl Harbor. The next day, he told leading Nazi party officials, referring to his 1939 prophecy, "The world war is here; the annihilation of the Jews must be the necessary consequence."

It took the Nazis several months after this to organize a continent-wide genocide. Reinhard Heydrich, head of the Reich Main Security Office (RSHA), convened the Wannsee Conference on 20 January 1942. This high-level meeting was intended to coordinate anti-Jewish policy. The majority of Holocaust killings were carried out in 1942, with it being the peak of the genocide, as over 3 million Jews were murdered, with 20 or 25 percent of Holocaust victims dying before early 1942 and the same number surviving by the end of the year.

=== Mass shooting ===
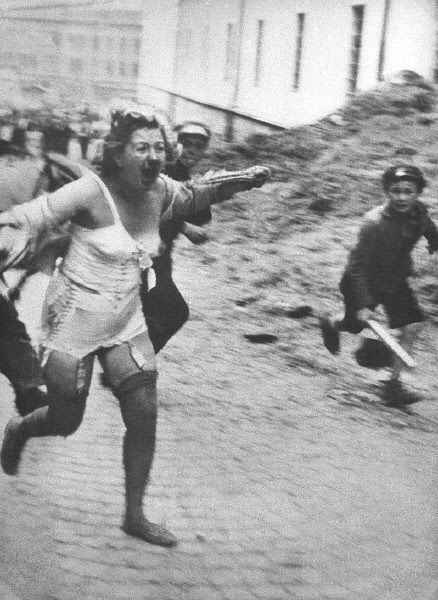
At least 3,000 Jews were killed during the 1941 Lviv pogroms, mainly by local Ukrainians.

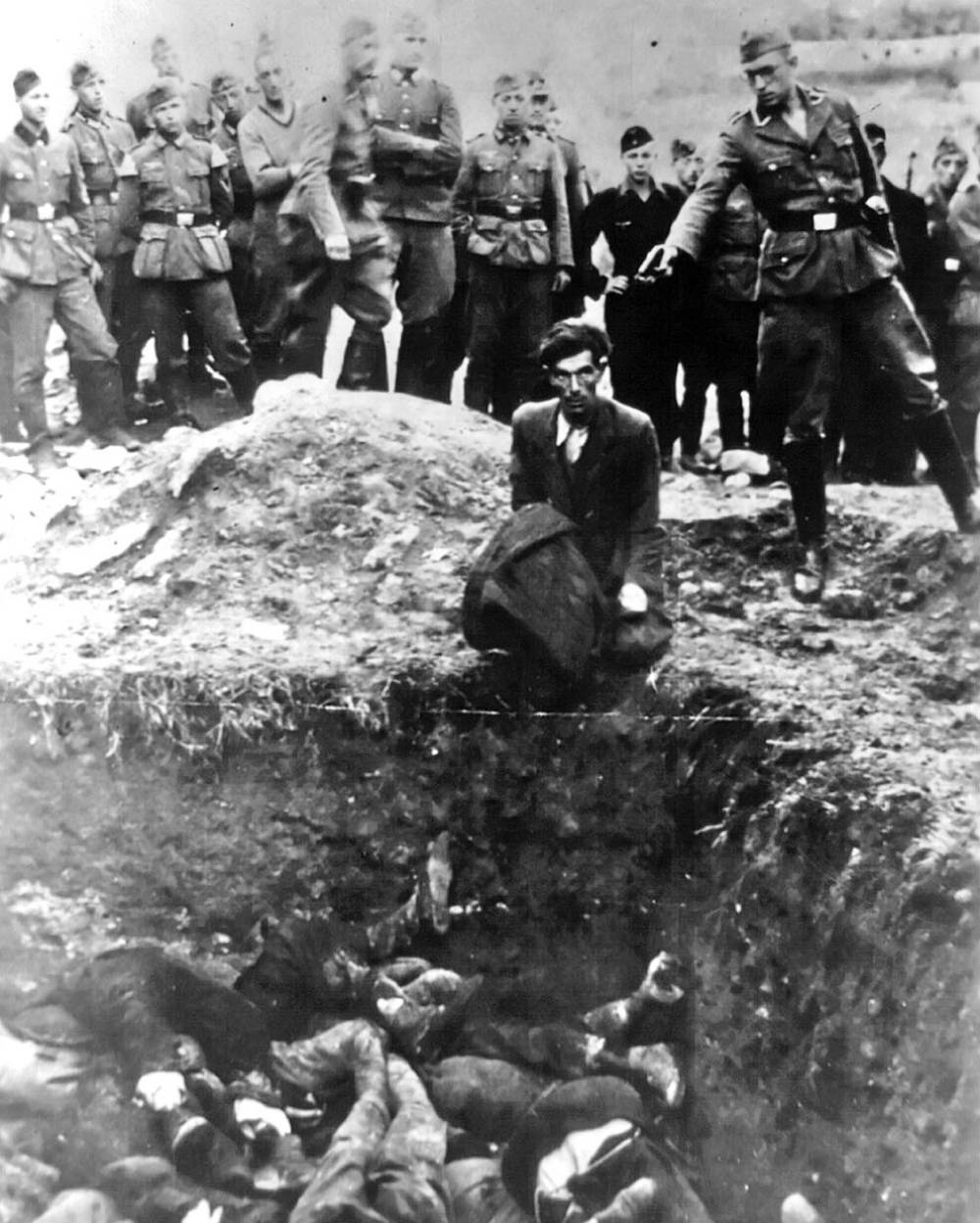
"The Last Jew in Vinnitsa": a Jewish man is shot by SS Jakobus Onnen, a member of Einsatzgruppe C, in Berdychiv, Ukraine, in July 1941.

The systematic murder of Jews began in the Soviet Union in 1941. During the invasion, many Jews were conscripted into the Red Army. Out of 10 or 15 million Soviet civilians who fled eastwards to the Soviet interior, 1.6 million were Jews. Local inhabitants killed as many as 50,000 Jews in pogroms in Latvia, Lithuania, eastern Poland, Ukraine, and the Romanian borderlands. Although German forces tried to incite pogroms, their role in causing violence is controversial. Romanian soldiers killed tens of thousands of Jews from Odessa by April 1942.

Prior to the invasion, the Einsatzgruppen were reorganized in preparation for mass killings and instructed to shoot Soviet officials and Jewish state and party employees. The shootings were justified on the basis of Jews' supposed central role in supporting the communist system, but it was not initially envisioned to kill all Soviet Jews. The occupiers relied on locals to identify Jews to be targeted. The first German mass killings targeted adult male Jews who had worked as civil servants or in jobs requiring education. Tens of thousands were shot by the end of July. The vast majority of civilian victims were Jews. In July and August Heinrich Himmler, the leader of the SS (Schutzstaffel), made several visits to the death squads' zones of operation, relaying orders to kill more Jews. At this time, the killers began to murder Jewish women and children, too. Executions peaked at 40,000 a month in Lithuania in August and September and in October and November reached their height in Belarus.

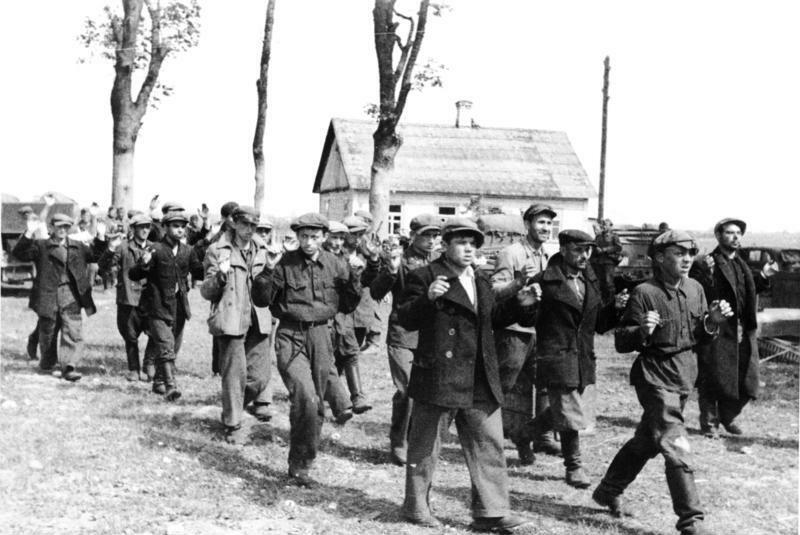
Original Nazi propaganda caption: "Too bad even for a bullet... The Jews shown here were shot at once." 28 June 1941 in Rozhanka, Belarus

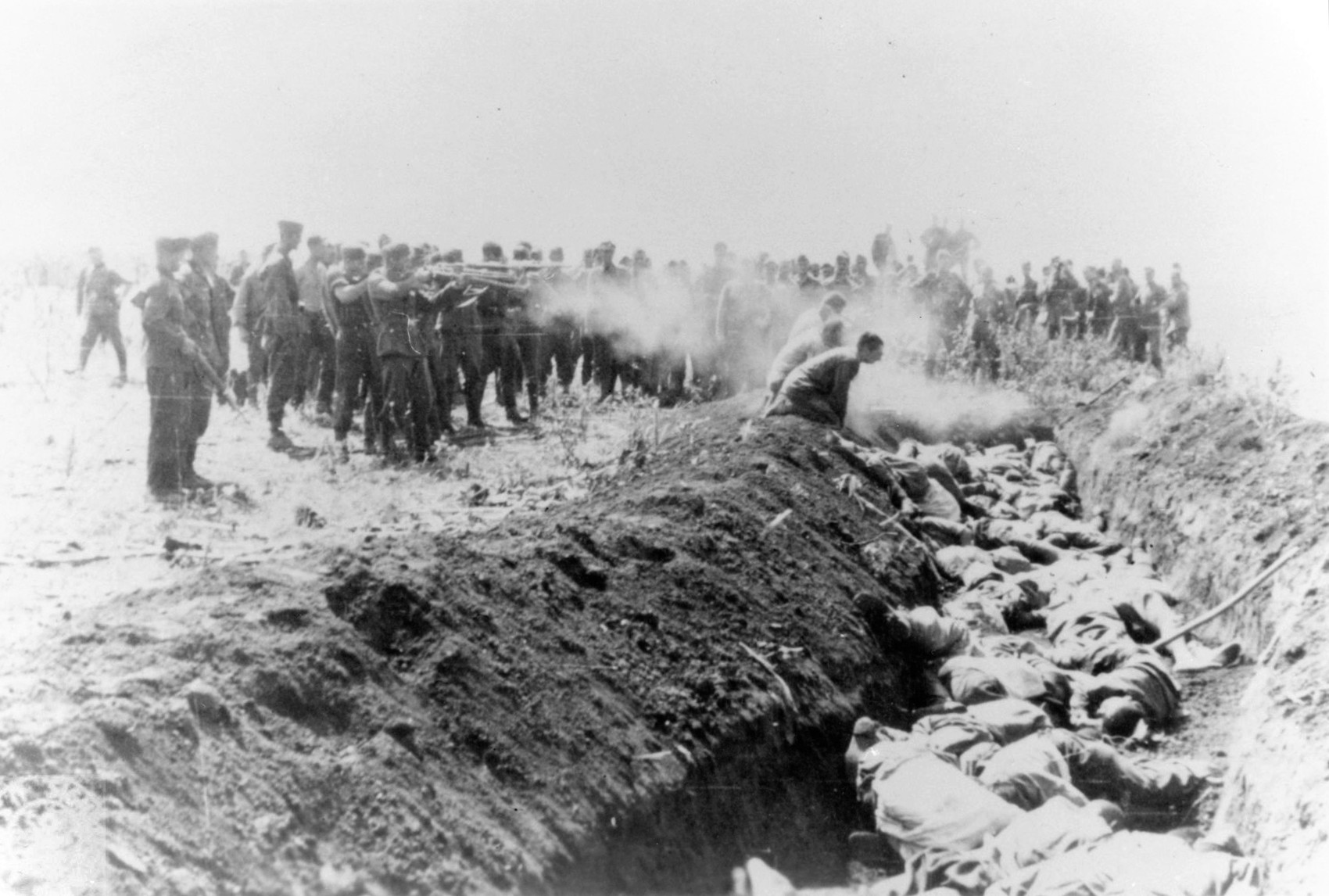
Shooting from behind became popular because killers did not have to look at their victims' faces and the dead were likely to fall into the grave.

The executions often took place a few kilometers from a town. Victims were rounded up and marched to the execution site, forced to undress, and shot into previously dug pits. The favored technique was a shot in the back of the neck with a single bullet. In the chaos, many victims were not killed by the gunfire but instead buried alive. Typically, the pits would be guarded after the execution but sometimes a few victims managed to escape afterwards. Executions were public spectacles and the victims' property was looted both by the occupiers and local inhabitants. Around 200 ghettos were established in the occupied Soviet Union, with many existing only briefly before their inhabitants were executed. A few large ghettos such as Vilna, Kovno, Riga, Białystok, and Lwów lasted into 1943 because they became centers of production.

Victims of mass shootings included Jews deported from elsewhere. Besides Germany, Romania killed the largest number of Jews. Romania deported about 154,000–170,000 Jews from Bessarabia and Bukovina to ghettos in Transnistria from 1941 to 1943. Jews from Transnistria were also imprisoned in these ghettos, where the total death toll may have reached 160,000. Hungary expelled thousands of Carpathian Ruthenian and foreign Jews in 1941, who were shortly thereafter shot in Ukraine. At the beginning of September, all German Jews were required to wear a yellow star, and in October, Hitler decided to deport them to the east and ban emigration. Between mid-October and the end of 1941, 42,000 Jews from Germany and its annexed territories and 5,000 Romani people from Austria were deported to Łódź, Kovno, Riga, and Minsk. In late November, 5,000 German Jews were shot outside of Kovno and another 1,000 near Riga, but Himmler ordered an end to such massacres and some in the senior Nazi leadership voiced doubts about killing German Jews. Executions of German Jews in the Baltics resumed in early 1942.

After the expansion of killings to target the entire Soviet Jewish population, the 3,000 men of the Einsatzgruppen proved insufficient and Himmler mobilized 21 battalions of Order Police to assist them. In addition, Wehrmacht soldiers, Waffen-SS brigades, and local auxiliaries shot many Jews. By the end of 1941, more than 80 percent of the Jews in central Ukraine, eastern Belarus, Russia, Latvia, and Lithuania had been shot, but less than 25 percent of those living farther west where 900,000 remained alive. By the end of the war, around 1.5 to 2 million Jews were shot and as many as 225,000 Roma. The murderers found the executions distressing and logistically inconvenient, which influenced the decision to switch to other methods of killing.

=== Deportation ===
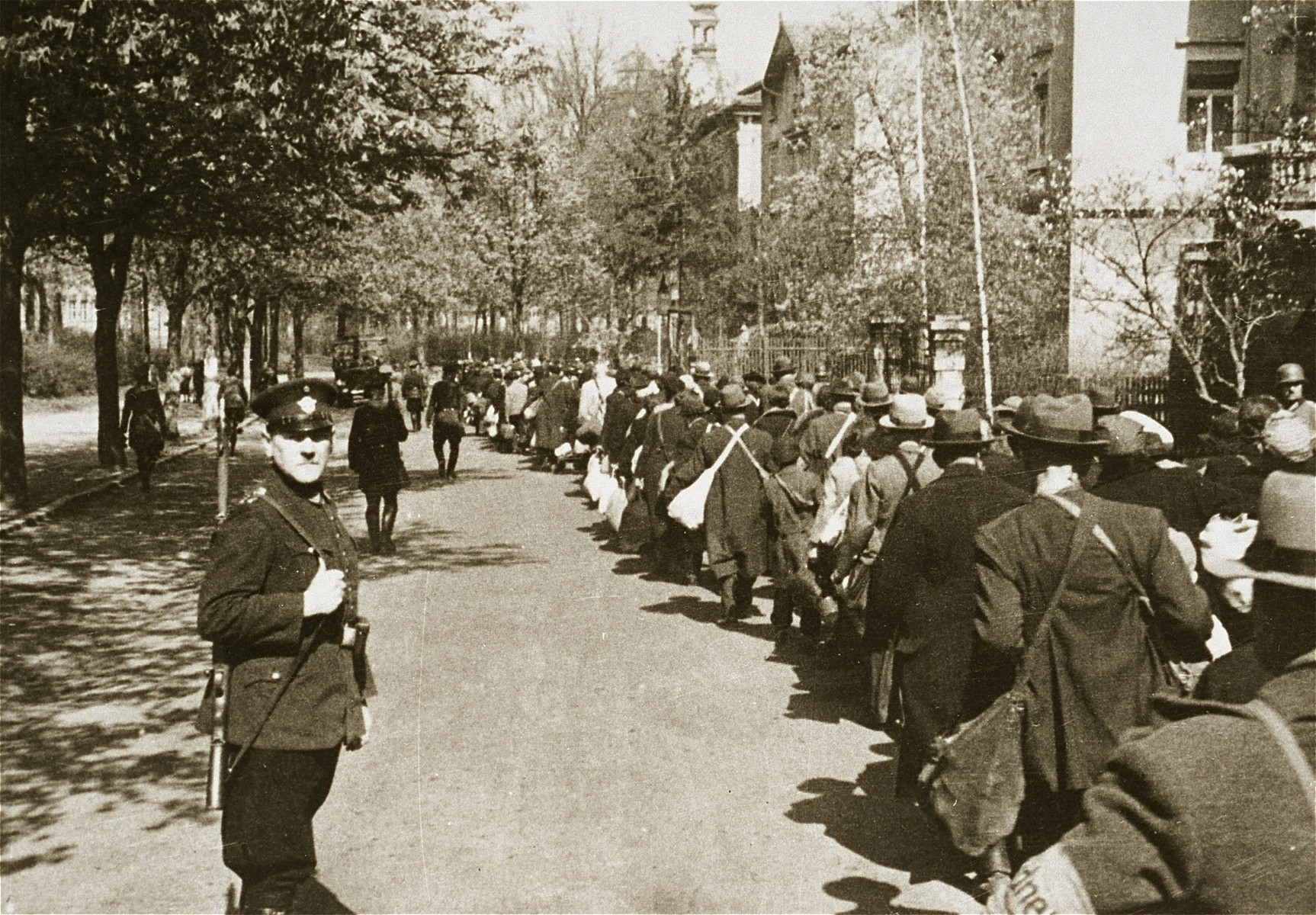
Jews are deported from Würzburg, Germany, to the Lublin District of the General Governorate, 25 April 1942.

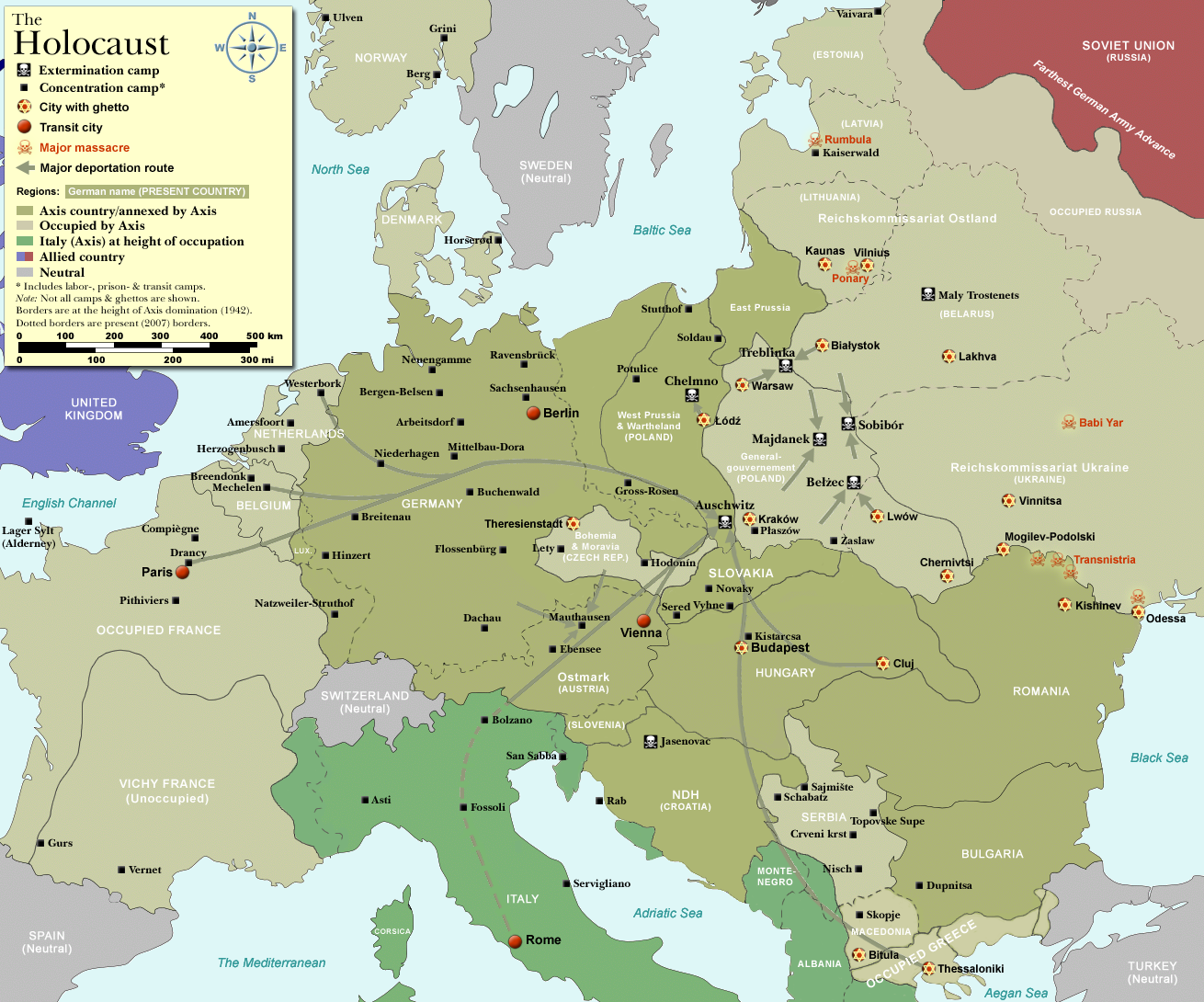
Map of the Holocaust throughout Europe

Unlike the killing areas in the east, the deportation from elsewhere in Europe was centrally organized from Berlin, although it depended on the outcome of negotiations with allied governments and popular responses to deportation. Beginning in late 1941, local administrators responded to the deportation of Jews to their area by massacring local Jews in order to free up space in ghettos for the deportees. If the deported Jews did not die of harsh conditions, they were killed later in extermination camps. Jews deported to Auschwitz were initially entered into the camp; the practice of conducting selections and murdering many prisoners upon arrival began in July 1942. In May and June, German and Slovak Jews deported to Lublin began to be sent directly to extermination camps.

In Western Europe, almost all Jewish deaths occurred after deportation. The occupiers often relied on local policemen to arrest Jews, limiting the number who were deported. In 1942, nearly 100,000 Jews were deported from Belgium, France, and the Netherlands. In France, 25 percent of the Jews were killed, most of whom were either non-citizens or recent immigrants. Si Kaddour Benghabrit and Abdelkader Mesli saved hundreds of Jews by hiding them in the basements of the Grand Mosque of Paris and other resistance efforts in France. The death rate in the Netherlands was higher than neighboring countries, which scholars have attributed to difficulty in hiding or increased collaboration of the Dutch police.

The German government sought the deportation of Jews from allied countries. The first to hand over its Jewish population was Slovakia, which arrested and deported about 58,000 Jews to Poland from March to October 1942. The Independent State of Croatia had already shot or killed in concentration camps the majority of its Jewish population (along with a larger number of Serbs), and later deported several thousand Jews in 1942 and 1943. The Bulgaria government cooperated by deporting 11,000 Jews from Bulgarian-occupied Greece and Yugoslavia, who were murdered at Treblinka, but declined to allow the deportation of Jews from its prewar territory, due to widespread opposition from prominent individuals and groups within Bulgaria itself.

Until German occupation of Hungary in March 1944, the Hungarian government did not deport very many of its approximately 846,000 people considered Jewish by the racial laws of that time (although Jews were murdered in raids and incidents). Also, Romania did not send many Jews; the Romanian and Hungarian Jewish populations were the largest surviving European Jewish populations after 1942. But between March 1944 and 9 July 1944, 434,000 of the still 825,000 Hungarian Jews were deported on trains, mostly to Auschwitz where the great majority of them were murdered immediately. Roughly 255,000 Jewish Hungarians (29.6 percent) are estimated to somehow have survived the war and Holocaust.

Prior to the German occupation of Italy in September 1943, there were no serious attempt to deport Italian Jews, and Italy refused to allow the deportation of Jews in many Italian-occupied areas. Nazi Germany did not attempt the destruction of the Finnish Jews and the North African Jews living under French or Italian rule.

=== Extermination camps ===
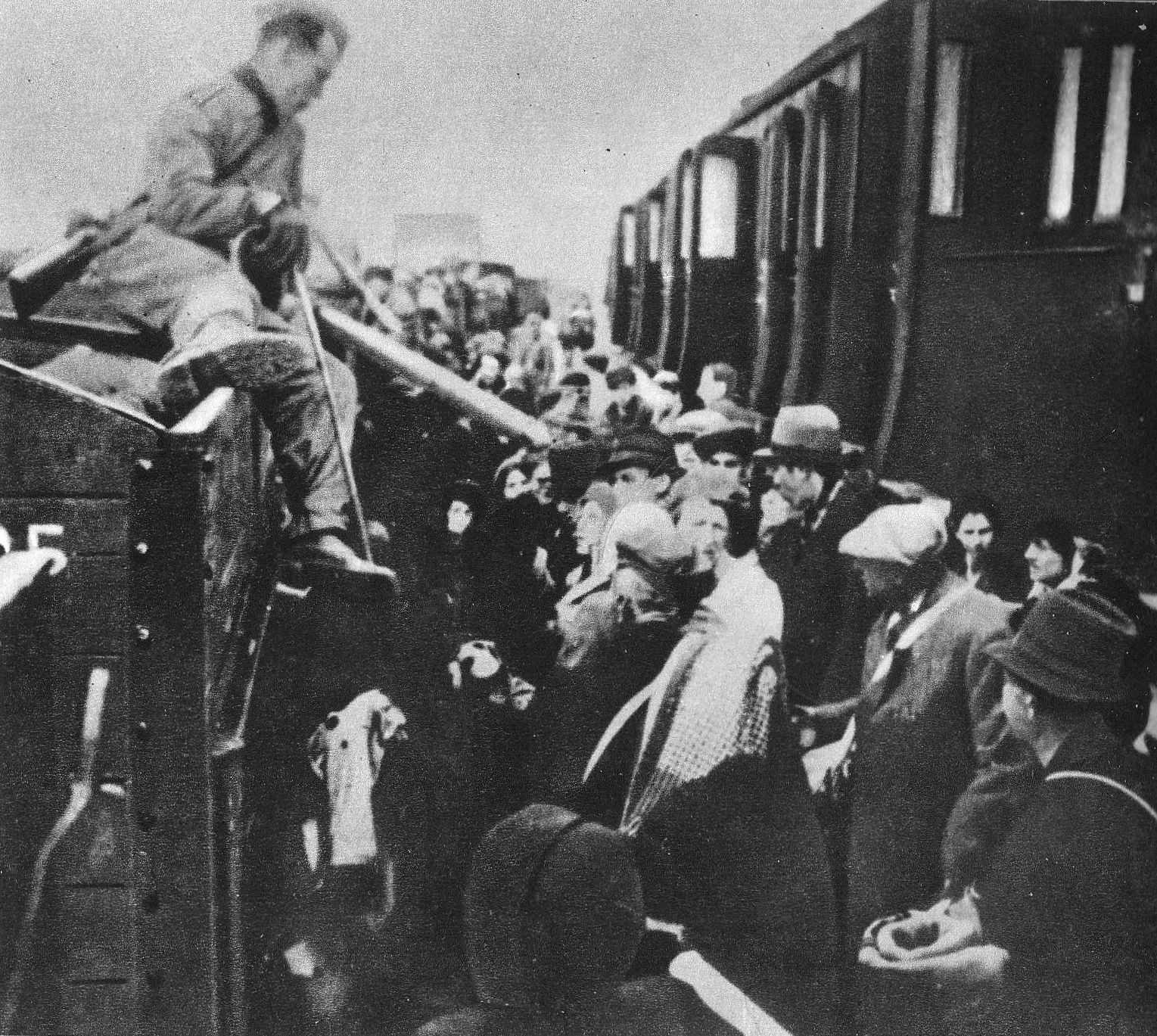
Deportation to Chełmno

Gas vans developed from those used to kill mental patients since 1939 were assigned to the Einsatzgruppen and first used in November 1941; victims were forced into the van and killed with engine exhaust. The first extermination camp was Chełmno in the Wartheland, established on the initiative of the local civil administrator Arthur Greiser with Himmler's approval; it began operations in December 1941 using gas vans. In October 1941, Higher SS and Police Leader of Lublin Odilo Globocnik began work planning Belzec—the first purpose-built extermination camp to feature stationary gas chambers using carbon monoxide based on the previous Aktion T4 programme—amid increasing talk among German administrators in Poland of large-scale murder of Jews in the General Governorate. In late 1941 in East Upper Silesia, Jews in forced-labor camps operated by the Schmelt Organization deemed "unfit for work" began to be sent in groups to Auschwitz where they were murdered. In early 1942, Zyklon B became the preferred killing method in extermination camps after gassing experiments were conducted on Russian POWs in late August 1941.

The camps were located on rail lines to make it easier to transport Jews to their deaths, but in remote places to avoid notice. The stench caused by mass killing operations was noticeable to anyone nearby. Except in the deportations from western and central Europe, people were typically deported to the camps in overcrowded cattle cars. As many as 150 people were forced into a single boxcar. Many died en route, partly because of the low priority accorded to these transports. Shortage of rail transport sometimes led to postponement or cancellation of deportations. Upon arrival, the victims were robbed of their remaining possessions, forced to undress, had their hair cut, and were chased into the gas chamber. Death from the gas was agonizing and could take as long as 30 minutes. The gas chambers were primitive and sometimes malfunctioned. Some prisoners were shot because the gas chambers were not functioning. At other extermination camps, nearly everyone on a transport was killed on arrival, but at Auschwitz around 20–25 percent were separated out for labor, although many of these prisoners died later on through starvation, mass shooting, torture, and medical experiments.

Belzec, Sobibor, and Treblinka reported a combined revenue of RM 178.7 million from belongings stolen from their victims, far exceeding costs. Combined, the camps required the labor of less than 3,000 Jewish prisoners, 1,000 Trawniki men (largely Ukrainian auxiliaries), and very few German guards. About half of the Jews killed in the Holocaust died by poison gas. Thousands of Romani people were also murdered in the extermination camps. Prisoner uprisings at Treblinka and Sobibor meant that these camps were shut down earlier than envisioned.

Major extermination camps
| Camp | Location | Number of Jews killed | Killing technology | Planning began | Mass gassing duration |
|---|---|---|---|---|---|
| Chełmno | Wartheland | 150,000 | Gas vans | July 1941 | 8 December 1941 – April 1943 and April–July 1944 |
| Belzec | Lublin District | 440,823–596,200 | Stationary gas chamber, engine exhaust | October 1941 | 17 March 1942 – December 1942 |
| Sobibor | Lublin District | 170,618–238,900 | Stationary gas chamber, engine exhaust | Late 1941 or March 1942 | May 1942 – October 1943 |
| Treblinka | Warsaw District | 780,863–951,800 | Stationary gas chamber, engine exhaust | April 1942 | 23 July 1942 – October 1943 |
| Auschwitz II–Birkenau | East Upper Silesia | 900,000–1,000,000 | Stationary gas chamber, hydrogen cyanide | September 1941 (built as POW camp) | February 1942 – October 1944 |

=== Liquidation of the ghettos in Poland ===
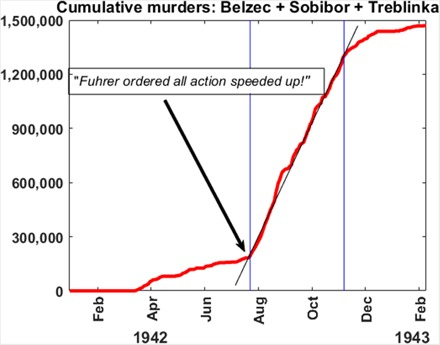
Cumulative murders of Jews from the General Governorate at Belzec, Sobibor, and Treblinka from January 1942 to February 1943

Plans to kill most of the Jews in the General Governorate were affected by various goals of the SS, military, and civil administration to reduce the amount of food consumed by Jews, enable a slight increase in rations to non-Jewish Poles, and combat the black market. In March 1942, killings began in Belzec, targeting Jews from Lublin who were not capable of work. This action reportedly reduced the black market and was deemed a success to be replicated elsewhere. By mid-1942, Nazi leaders decided to allow only 300,000 Jews to survive in the General Governorate by the end of the year for forced labor; for the most part, only those working in armaments production were spared. The majority of ghettos were liquidated in mass executions nearby, especially if they were not near a train station. Larger ghettos were more commonly liquidated during multiple deportations to extermination camps. During this campaign, 1.5 million Polish Jews were murdered in the largest killing operation of the Holocaust.

In order to reduce resistance, the ghetto would be raided without warning, usually in the early morning, and the extent of the operation would be concealed as long as possible. Trawniki men would cordon off the ghetto while the Order Police and Security Police carried out the action. In addition to local non-Jewish collaborators, the Jewish councils and Jewish ghetto police were often ordered to assist with liquidation actions, although these Jews were in most cases murdered later. Chaotic, capriciously executed selections determined who would be loaded onto the trains. Many Jews were shot during the action, often leaving ghettos strewn with corpses. Jewish forced laborers had to clean it up and collect any valuables from the victims.

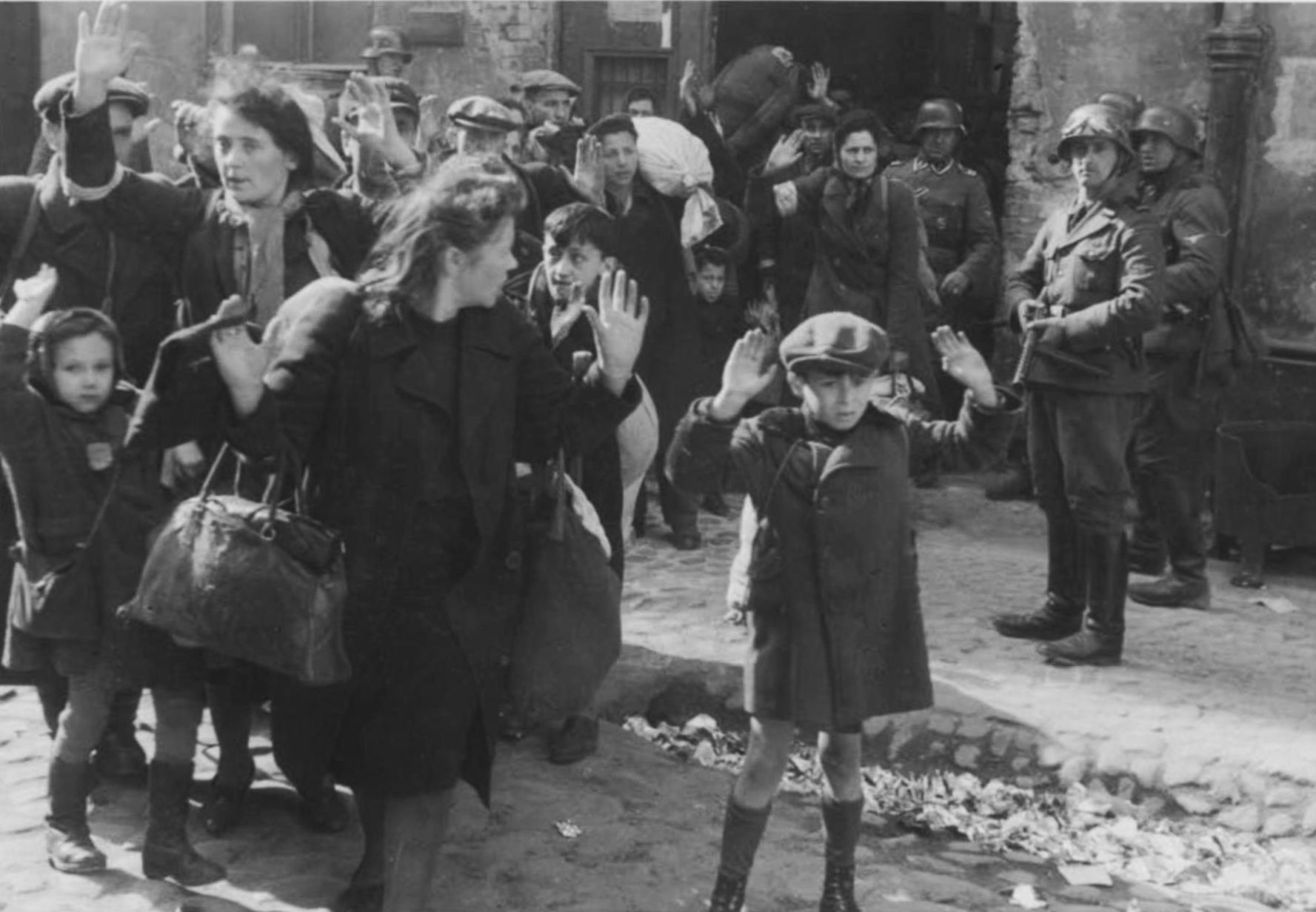
The Warsaw Ghetto Uprising became significant as a symbol of Jewish resistance against the Nazis.

The Warsaw Ghetto was cleared between 22 July and 12 September 1942. Of the original population of 350,000 Jews, 250,000 were killed at Treblinka, 11,000 were deported to labor camps, 10,000 were shot in the ghetto, 35,000 were allowed to remain in the ghetto after a final selection, and around 20,000 or 25,000 managed to hide in the ghetto. Misdirection efforts convinced many Jews that they could avoid deportation until it was too late. During a six-week period beginning in August, 300,000 Jews from the Radom District were sent to Treblinka.

At the same time as the mass killing of Jews in the General Governorate, Jews who were in ghettos to the west and east were targeted. Tens of thousands of Jews were deported from ghettos in the Warthegau and East Upper Silesia to Chełmno and Auschwitz. 300,000 Jews—largely skilled laborers—were shot in Volhynia, Podolia, and southwestern Belarus. Deportations and mass executions in the Bialystok District and Galicia killed many Jews. Although there was practically no resistance in the General Governorate in 1942, some Soviet Jews improvised weapons, attacked those attempting to liquidate the ghetto, and set it on fire. These ghetto uprisings were only undertaken when the inhabitants began to believe that their death was certain. In 1943, larger uprisings in Warsaw, Białystok, and Glubokoje necessitated the use of heavy weapons. The uprising in Warsaw prompted the Nazi leadership to liquidate additional ghettos and labor camps in German-occupied Poland with their inhabitants massacred, such as the Wola Massacre, or deported to extermination camps for fear of additional Jewish resistance developing. Nevertheless, in early 1944, more than 70,000 Jews were performing forced labor in the General Governorate.

=== Forced labor ===
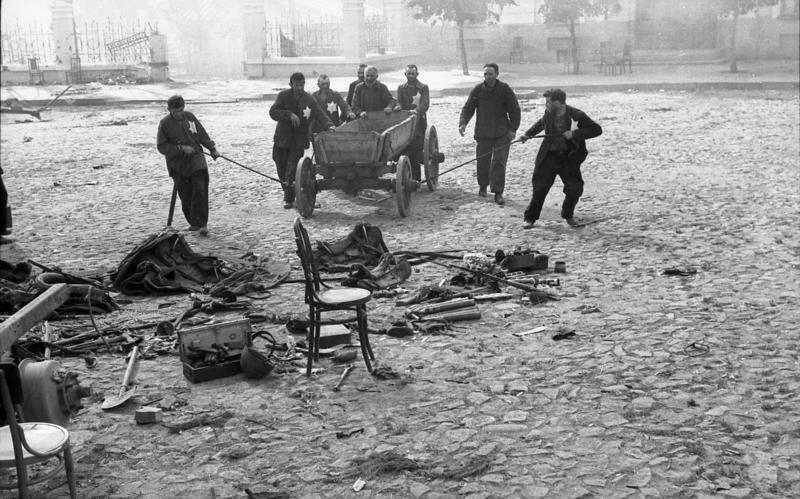
Jews of Mogilev, Belarus, forced to clean a street, July 1941

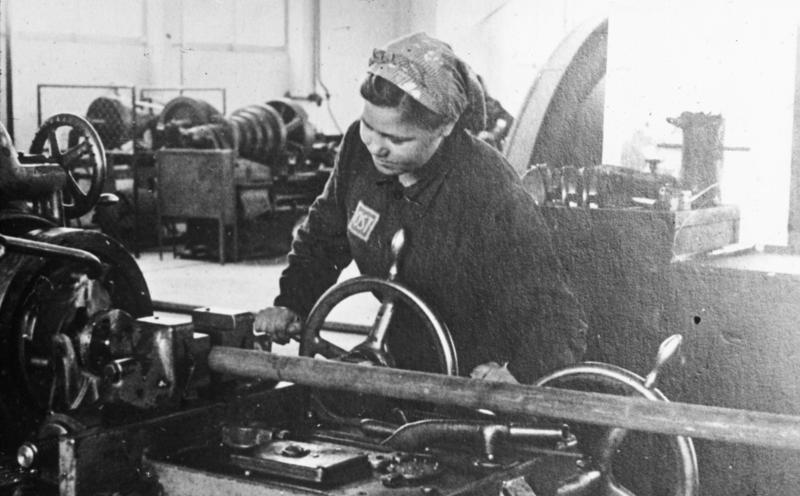
Woman with Ostarbeiter badge at work at IG-Farbenwerke in Auschwitz

Beginning in 1938—especially in Germany and its annexed territories—many Jews were drafted into forced-labor camps and segregated work details. These camps were often of a temporary nature and typically overseen by civilian authorities. Initially, mortality did not increase dramatically. After mid-1941, conditions for Jewish forced laborers drastically worsened and death rates increased; even private companies deliberately subjected workers to murderous conditions. Beginning in 1941 and increasingly as time went on, Jews capable of employment were separated from others—who were usually killed. They were typically employed in non-skilled jobs and could be replaced easily if non-Jewish workers were available, but those in skilled positions had a higher chance of survival. Although conditions varied widely between camps, Jewish forced laborers were typically treated worse than non-Jewish prisoners and suffered much higher mortality rates.

In mid-1943, Himmler sought to bring surviving Jewish forced laborers under the control of the SS in the concentration camp system. (Note: The Nazi concentration camp system administered by the SS Main Economic and Administrative Office (SS-WVHA) was administratively separate from other forced-labor camps and from the single-purpose extermination camps.) Some of the forced-labor camps for Jews and some ghettos, such as Kovno, were designated concentration camps, while others were dissolved and surviving prisoners sent to a concentration camp. Despite many deaths, as many as 200,000 Jews survived the war inside the concentration camps. Although most Holocaust victims were never imprisoned in a concentration camp, the image of these camps is a popular symbol of the Holocaust.

Including the Soviet prisoners of war, 13 million people were brought to Germany for forced labor. The largest nationalities were Soviet and Polish and they were the worst-treated groups except for Roma and Jews. Soviet and Polish forced laborers endured inadequate food and medical treatment, long hours, and abuse by employers. Hundreds of thousands died. Many others were forced to work for the occupiers without leaving their country of residence. Some of Germany's allies, including Slovakia and Hungary, agreed to deport Jews to protect non-Jews from German demands for forced labor. East European women were also kidnapped, via lapanka, to serve as sex slaves of German soldiers in military and camp brothels despite the prohibition of relationships, including fraternization, between German and foreign workers, which imposed the penalty of imprisonment and death.

== Perpetrators and beneficiaries ==
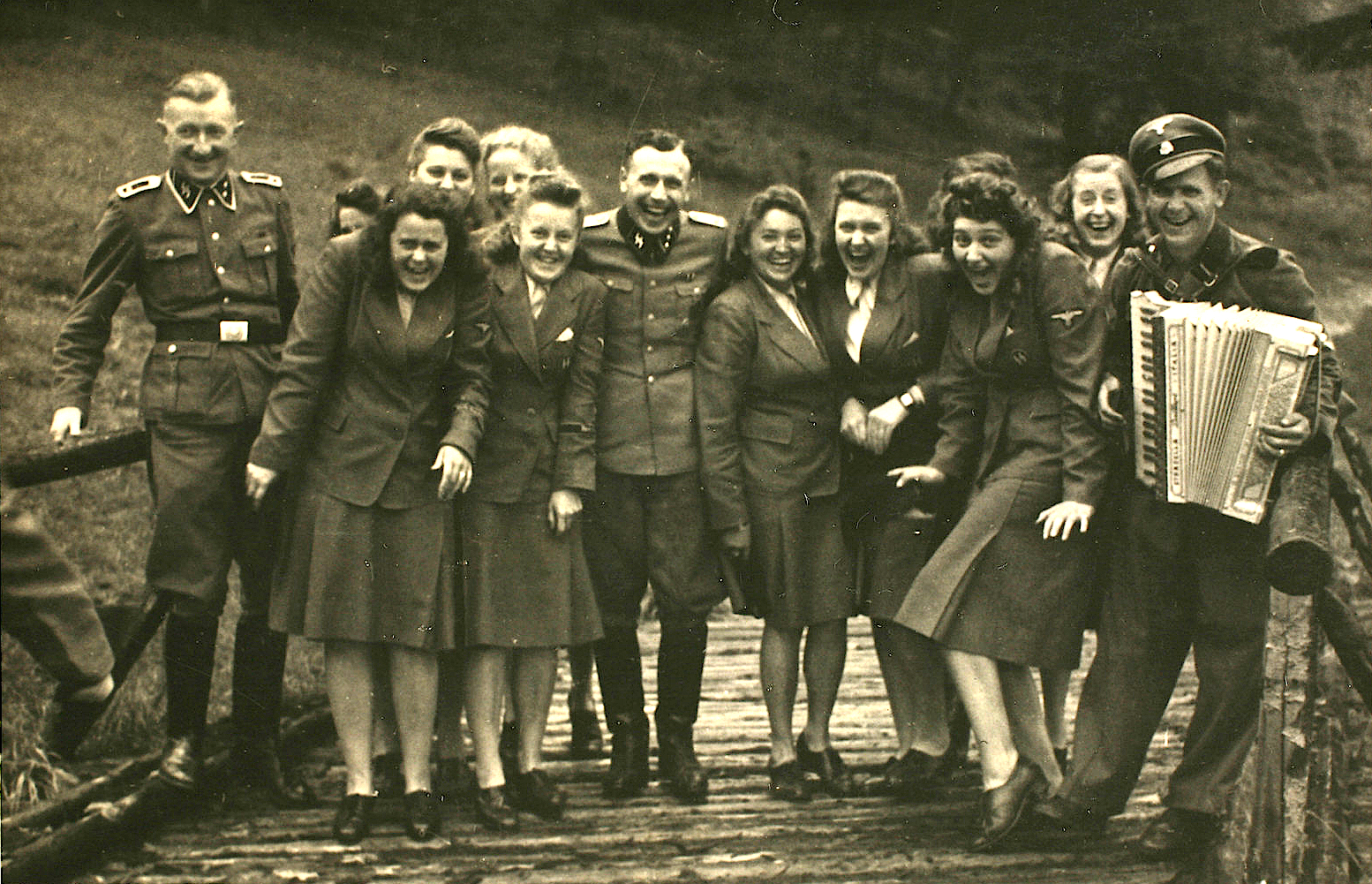
Auschwitz SS guards and female staff auxiliaries on vacation in Solahütte in 1944

Hundreds of thousands participated in the Holocaust. Genocide required the active and tacit consent of millions of Germans and non-Germans. The motivation of Holocaust perpetrators varied and has led to historiographical debate. Studies of the SS officials who organized the Holocaust have found that most had strong ideological commitment to Nazism. In addition to ideological factors, many perpetrators were motivated by the prospect of material gain and social advancement. German SS, police, and regular army units rarely had trouble finding enough men to shoot Jewish civilians, even though punishment for refusal was absent or light.

Non-German perpetrators and collaborators included Dutch, French, and Polish policemen, Romanian soldiers, foreign SS and police auxiliaries, Ukrainian Insurgent Army partisans, and some civilians. Some were coerced into committing violence against Jews, but others killed for entertainment, material rewards, the possibility of better treatment from the occupiers, or ideological motivations such as nationalism and anti-communism. According to historian Christian Gerlach, non-Germans "not under German command" caused 5 to 6 percent of the Jewish deaths, and their involvement was crucial in other ways.

Millions of Germans and others benefited from the genocide. Corruption was rampant in the SS despite the proceeds of the Holocaust being designated as state property. Different German state agencies vied to receive property stolen from Jews. Many workers were able to obtain better jobs vacated by murdered Jews. Businessmen benefitted from eliminating their Jewish competitors or taking over Jewish-owned businesses. Others took over housing and possessions that had belonged to Jews. Some Poles living near the extermination camps later dug up human remains in search of valuables. The property of deported Jews was also appropriated by Germany's allies and collaborating governments. Even puppet states such as Vichy France and Norway were able to successfully lay claim to Jewish property. In the decades after the war, Swiss banks became notorious for harboring gold deposited by Nazis who had stolen it during the Holocaust, as well as profiting from unclaimed deposits made by Holocaust victims.

Several companies benefited from the Holocaust, including several companies that are prominent in the modern day. Some of the largest examples are Bayer, BMW, and Volkswagen.

== Escape and hiding ==
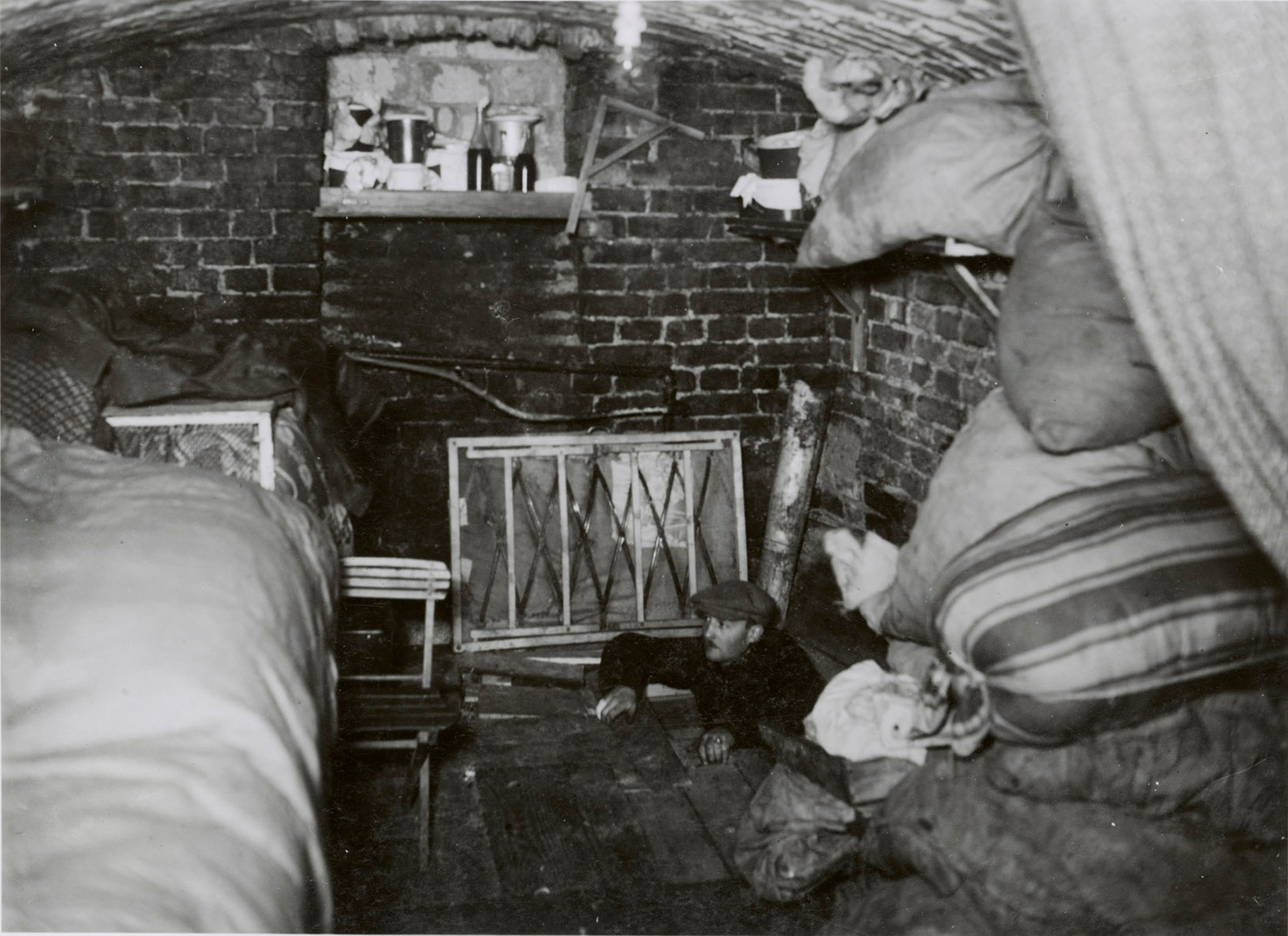
A bunker where Jews attempted to hide during the Warsaw Ghetto Uprising

Gerlach estimates that 200,000 Jews survived in hiding across Europe. Knowledge of German intentions was essential to take action, but many struggled to believe the news. Many attempted to jump from trains or flee ghettos and camps, but successfully escaping and living in hiding was extremely difficult and often unsuccessful.

The support, or at least absence of active opposition, of the local population was essential but often lacking in Eastern Europe. Those in hiding depended on the assistance of non-Jews. Having money, social connections with non-Jews, a non-Jewish appearance, perfect command of the local language, determination, and luck played a major role in determining survival. Jews in hiding were hunted down with the assistance of local collaborators and rewards offered for their denunciation. The death penalty was sometimes enforced on people hiding them, especially in eastern Europe. Rescuers' motivations varied on a spectrum from altruism to expecting sex or material gain; it was not uncommon for helpers to betray or murder Jews if their money ran out. Gerlach argues that hundreds of thousands of Jews may have died because of rumors or denunciations, and many others never attempted to escape because of a belief it was hopeless.

Jews participated in resistance movements in most European countries, and often were overrepresented. Jews were not always welcome, particularly in nationalist resistance groups—some of which killed Jews. Particularly in Belarus, with its favorable geography of dense forests, many Jews joined the Soviet partisans—an estimated 20,000 to 25,000 across the Soviet Union. An additional 10,000 to 13,000 Jewish non-combatants lived in family camps in Eastern European forests, of which the most well known was the Bielski partisans.

== International reactions ==
The Nazi leaders knew that their actions would bring international condemnation. On 26 June 1942, BBC services in all languages publicized a report by the Jewish Social-Democratic Bund and other resistance groups and transmitted by the Polish government-in-exile, documenting the killing of 700,000 Jews in Poland. In December 1942, the Allies, then known as the United Nations, adopted a joint declaration condemning the systematic murder of Jews. Most neutral countries in Europe maintained a pro-German foreign policy during the war. Nevertheless, some Jews were able to escape to neutral countries, whose policies ranged from rescue to non-action.

During the war the American Jewish Joint Distribution Committee (JDC) raised $70 million and in the years after the war it raised $300 million. This money was spent aiding emigrants and providing direct relief in the form of parcels and other assistance to Jews living under German occupation, and after the war to Holocaust survivors. The United States banned sending relief into German-occupied Europe after entering the war, but the JDC continued to do so. From 1939 to 1944, 81,000 European Jews emigrated with the JDC's assistance.

Throughout the war, no detailed photo intelligence study was carried out on any of the major concentration or extermination camps. Appeals from Jewish representatives to the American and British governments to bomb rail lines leading to the camps or crematoriums was rejected, with little to no input from the War Departments of the United States or United Kingdom. However, debate exists on whether a military response would have impacted on the Holocaust.

== Second half of the war ==
=== Continuing killings ===
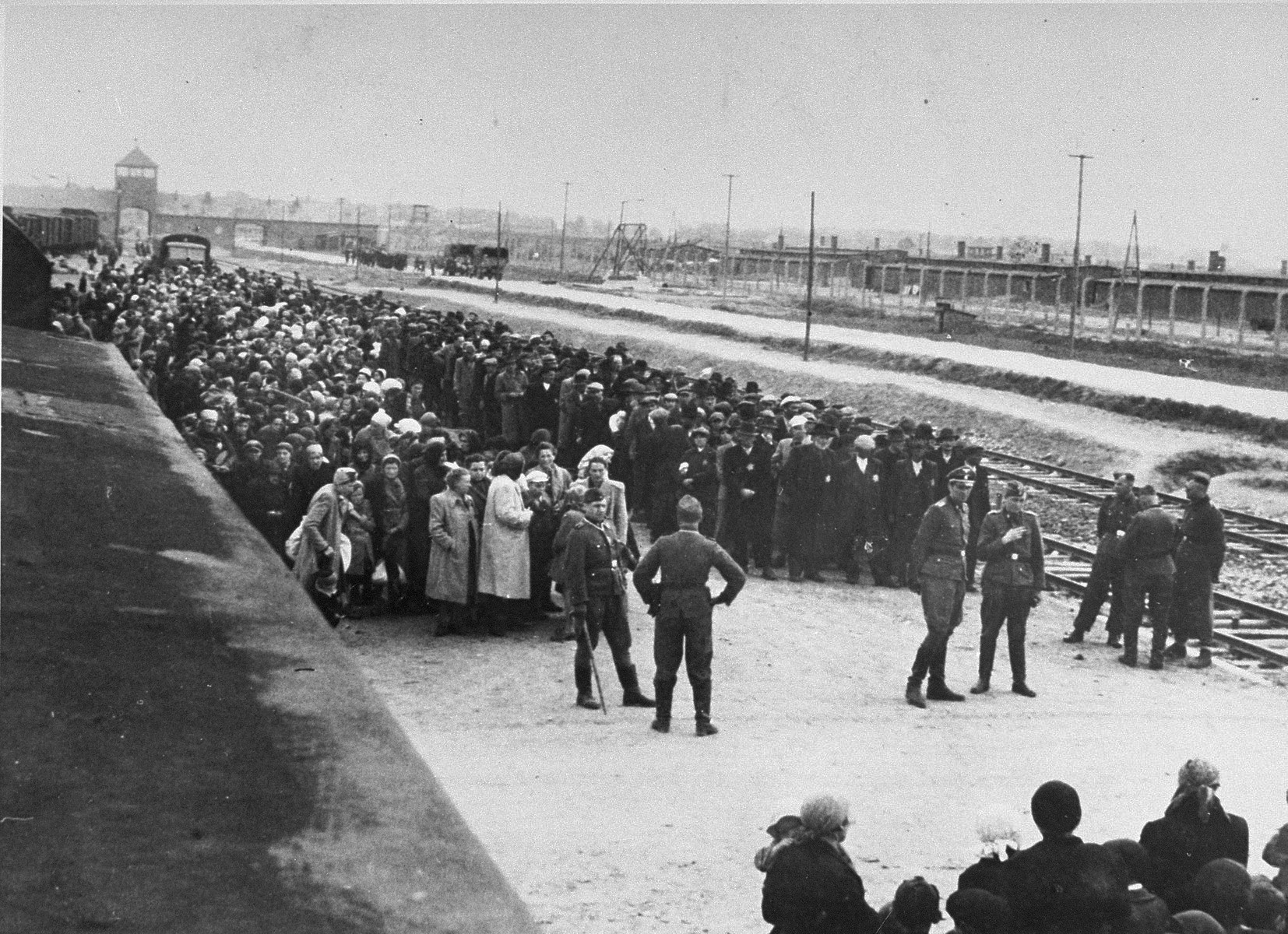
Jews from Carpathian Ruthenia, annexed by Hungary in 1938, on the selection ramp at Auschwitz II in May or June 1944. Men are lined up to the right, women and children to the left. About 25 percent were selected for work and the rest gassed.

After German military defeats in 1943, it became increasingly evident that Germany would lose the war. In early 1943, 45,000 Jews were deported from German-occupied northern Greece, primarily Salonica, to Auschwitz, where nearly all were killed. After Italy switched sides in late 1943, Germany deported several thousand Jews from Italy and the former Italian occupation zones of France, Yugoslavia, Albania, and Greece, with limited success. Attempts to continue deportations in Western Europe after 1942 often failed because of Jews going into hiding and the increasing recalcitrance of local authorities. Most Danish Jews escaped to Sweden with the help of the Danish resistance in the face of a half-hearted German deportation effort in late 1943. Additional killings in 1943 and 1944 eliminated all remaining ghettos and most surviving Jews in Eastern Europe. Belzec, Sobibor, and Treblinka were shut down and destroyed.

The largest murder action after 1942 was that against the Hungarian Jews. After the German invasion of Hungary in 1944, the Hungarian government cooperated closely in the deportation of 437,000 Jews in eight weeks, mostly to Auschwitz. The expropriation of Jewish property was useful to achieve Hungarian economic goals and sending the Jews as forced laborers avoided the need to send non-Jewish Hungarians. Those who survived the selection were forced to provide construction and manufacturing labor as part of a last-ditch effort to increase the production of fighter aircraft. Although the Nazis' goal of eliminating any Jewish population from Germany had largely been achieved in 1943, it was reversed in 1944 as a result of the importation of these Jews for labor.

=== Death marches and liberation ===
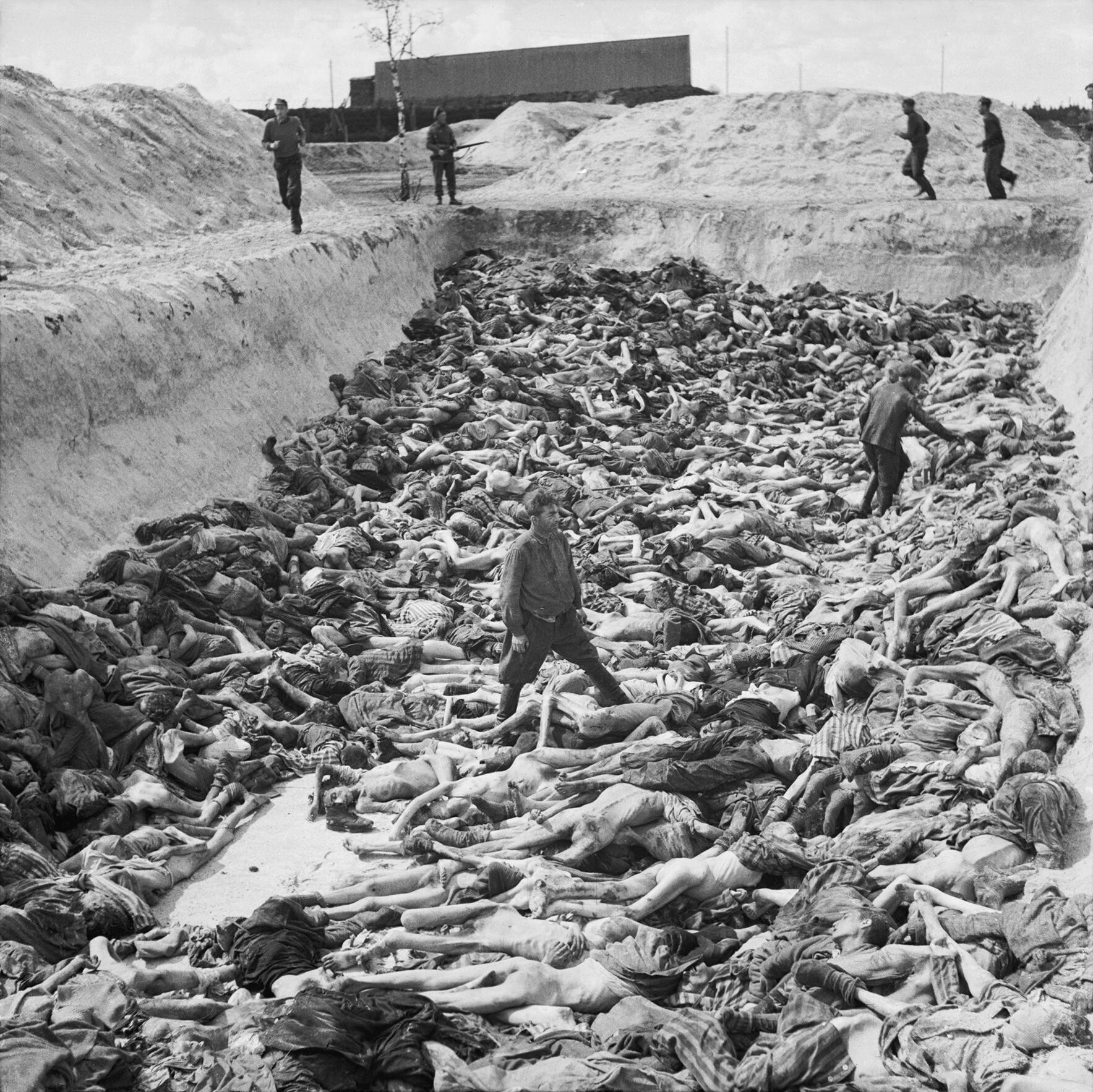
A mass grave at Bergen-Belsen after the camp's liberation, April 1945

In July 1944, Soviet forces advancing through occupied Poland liberated Majdanek concentration camp, and the atrocities discovered there were publicized. Shortly after this, Heinrich Himmler ordered that all concentration camp prisoners be evacuated to the interior of the Reich. There were three primary motivations for this order. The SS did not want liberated inmates to fall into enemy hands and give testimony to the Allies. It also wanted to hold onto forced laborers to keep up armament production as much as possible. In addition, Himmler hoped to use Jewish concentration camp prisoners as hostages for a peace deal with the Western Allies that would preserve the Nazi regime as it continued to fight the Soviets. Over the summer and early autumn months of 1944, mass evacuations of concentration camp inmates were carried out by train, and in the case of the Baltics which had been cut off, by ship. However, as winter approached, Allied forces came closer to Germany's borders, and Allied air superiority grew, concentration camp inmates were increasingly evacuated on foot in forced marches. Weak and sick prisoners were often killed in the camp and those forced to evacuate were usually given no or inadequate food. Those who could not keep up during the marches were shot. In October and November 1944, 90,000 Jews were deported from Budapest to the Austrian border. The transfer of prisoners from Auschwitz began in mid-1944. The last mass gassing at a killing center during the Holocaust took place at Auschwitz in November 1944, after which the gas chambers were shut down and destroyed, and in January most of the remaining 67,000 Auschwitz prisoners were sent on a death march westwards.

In January 1945, more than 700,000 people were imprisoned in the concentration camp system, of whom as many as a third died before the end of the war. At this time, most concentration camp prisoners were Soviet and Polish civilians, either arrested for real or supposed resistance or for attempting to escape forced labor. The death marches led to the breakdown of supplies for the camps that continued to exist, causing additional deaths. Although there was no systematic killing of Jews during the death marches, around 70,000 to 100,000 Jews died in the last months of the war. Over the following months, Soviet forces liberated concentration camps as they pushed into the Baltics and Poland, by which time most prisoners had been evacuated, though some remained behind. Soviet troops liberated Auschwitz on 27 January 1945 and discovered a few thousand inmates still in the camp. Concentration camps in Germany, where the death march survivors were evacuated to, were liberated during the Western Allied invasion of Germany. The liberators found piles of corpses that they had to bulldoze into mass graves. Some survivors were freed there and others had been liberated by the Red Army during its march westwards.

== Death toll ==
Holocaust deaths as an approximate percentage of the 1939 Jewish population: 90 80 70 60 50 40 30 20 Low

Around six million Jews were killed, with a conservative estimate being 5.7 million Jews killed by the Germans and Romanians, of which 5.4 million were killed under Nazi occupation. Of the six million victims, the vast majority of those killed were from Eastern Europe, and with half from Poland, and 2.6 million within the 1941 Soviet borders. Around 1.3 million Jews who had once lived under Nazi rule or in one of Germany's allies survived the war. One-third of the Jewish population worldwide, and two-thirds of European Jews, had been wiped out. Death rates varied widely due to a variety of factors and approached 100 percent in some areas. Some reasons why survival chances varied was the availability of emigration and protection from Germany's allies—which saved around 600,000 Jews. Jewish children and the elderly faced even lower survival rates than adults. It is considered to be the single largest genocide in human history.

The deadliest phase of the Holocaust was Operation Reinhard, which was marked by the introduction of extermination camps. Roughly two million Jews in the General Government district of occupied Poland were killed from March 1942 to November 1943. Biologist Lewi Stone calculated that around 1.47 million Jews were murdered in Europe in just 100 days from late July to early November 1942, a rate that is approximately 83 percent higher than the commonly suggested figure for the Rwandan genocide. Between July and October 1942, two million Jews were murdered, including Operation Reinhard and other killings, with over three million Jews killed in 1942 alone, as stated by historian Christian Gerlach. Similarly, historian Alex J. Kay states that over two million Jews were murdered from late July to mid-November, and that "these three-and-a-half months were the most intense, the deadliest of the entire Holocaust". It was probably the fastest rate of genocidal killing in history.

On 3 November 1943, around 18,400 Jews were murdered at Majdanek over the course of nine hours, in what was the largest number ever killed in a death camp on a single day. It was part of Operation Harvest Festival, the murder of some 43,000 Jews, the single largest massacre of Jews by German forces, occurring from 3 to 4 November 1943. In some countries, such as Hungary, Jews were a majority of civilian deaths; in Poland, they were either a majority or about half.

Further Nazi persecutions from 1933 to 1945 killed a large number of non-Jewish civilians and POWs; estimated by Gerlach at 6 to 8 million, and at more than 10 million by Gilbert. The United States Holocaust Memorial Museum documents that several million non-Jewish victims, primarily Soviet prisoners of war and ethnic Poles, were killed in Nazi occupied Europe. In countries such as the Soviet Union, France, Greece, and Yugoslavia, non-Jewish civilian losses outnumbered Jewish deaths.

== Aftermath and legacy ==
=== Return home and emigration ===
After liberation, many Jews attempted to return home. Limited success in finding relatives, the refusal of many non-Jews to return property, and violent attacks such as the Kielce pogrom convinced many survivors to leave eastern Europe. Antisemitism was reported to increase in several countries after the war, in part due to conflicts over property restitution. When the war ended, there were less than 28,000 German Jews and 60,000 non-German Jews in Germany. By 1947, the number of Jews in Germany had increased to 250,000 owing to emigration from eastern Europe allowed by the communist authorities; Jews made up around 25 percent of the population of displaced persons camps. Although many survivors were in poor health, they attempted to organize self-government in these camps, including education and rehabilitation efforts. Due to the reluctance of other countries to allow their immigration, many survivors remained in Germany until the establishment of Israel in 1948. Others moved to the United States around 1950 due to loosened immigration restrictions.

=== Criminal trials ===
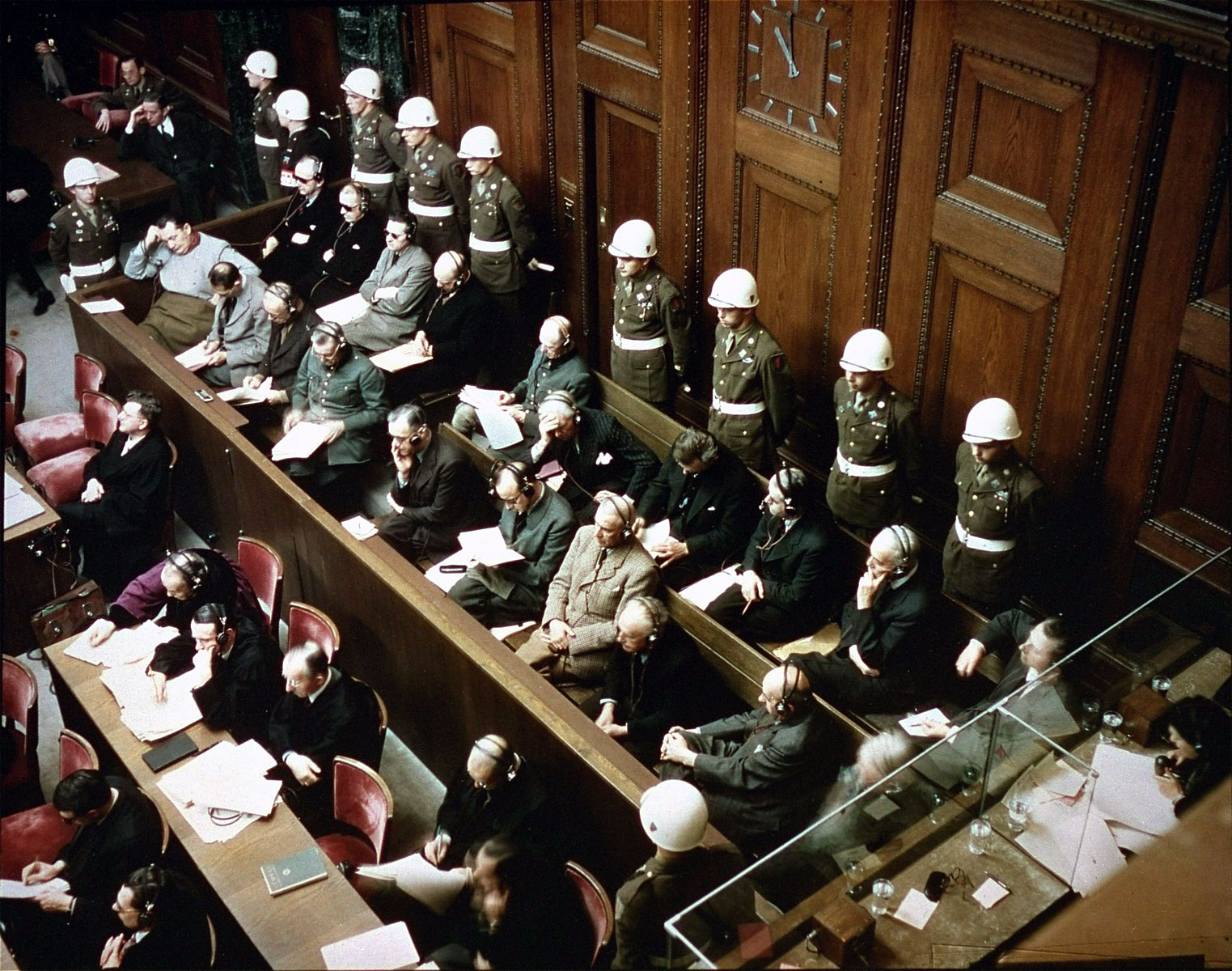
Defendants in the dock at the International Military Tribunal, November 1945

Historian Omer Bartov writes that the Holocaust's perpetrators were rarely punished, largely enjoying normal lives after the war: "very few of them seem to have felt, and rarely expressed, any personal sense of guilt." Former German State Justice Administration director Willi Dressen calculated that of the 106,000 people investigated for Nazi crimes in Germany, only 6,500 were sentenced, with 166 receiving life sentences. Dressen said that these numbers meant that "purely statistically, each murder cost ten minutes in prison". During and after World War II, many European countries launched widespread purges of real and perceived Nazi collaborators that affected possibly as much as 2–3 percent of the population of Europe, although most of the resulting trials did not emphasize crimes against Jews. Nazi atrocities led to the United Nations' Genocide Convention in 1948, but it was not used in Holocaust trials due to the non-retroactivity of criminal laws.

In 1945 and 1946, the International Military Tribunal tried 23 Nazi leaders primarily for waging wars of aggression, which the prosecution argued was the root of Nazi criminality; nevertheless, the systematic murder of Jews came to take center stage. This trial and others held by the Allies in occupied Germany—the United States Army alone charged 1,676 defendants in 462 war crimes trials—were widely perceived as an unjust form of political revenge by the German public. West Germany later investigated 100,000 people and tried more than 6,000 defendants, mainly low-level perpetrators. The high-level organizer Adolf Eichmann was kidnapped and tried in Israel in 1961. Instead of convicting Eichmann on the basis of documentary evidence, Israeli prosecutors asked many Holocaust survivors to testify, a strategy that increased publicity but has proven controversial.

=== Reparations ===
Historians estimate that property losses to Jews of Germany, Austria, the Netherlands, France, Poland, and Hungary amounted to around 10 billion in 1944 dollars, or $180 billion in 2025. This estimate does not include the value of labor extracted. Overall, the amount of Jewish property looted by the Nazis was about 10 percent of the total stolen from occupied countries. Efforts by survivors to receive reparations for their losses began immediately after World War II. There was an additional wave of restitution efforts in the 1990s connected to the fall of Communism in eastern Europe.

Between 1945 and 2018, Germany paid $86.8 billion in restitution and compensation to Holocaust survivors and heirs. In 1952, West Germany negotiated an agreement to pay DM 3 billion (around $714 million) to Israel and DM 450 million (around $107 million) to the Claims Conference. Germany paid pensions and other reparations for harm done to some Holocaust survivors. Other countries have paid restitution for assets stolen from Jews from these countries. Most Western European countries restored some property to Jews after the war, while communist countries nationalized many formerly Jewish assets, meaning that the overall amount restored to Jews has been lower in those countries. Poland is the only member of the European Union that never passed any restitution legislation. Many restitution programs fell short of restoration of prewar assets, and in particular, large amounts of immovable property were never returned to survivors or their heirs.

=== Remembrance and historiography ===
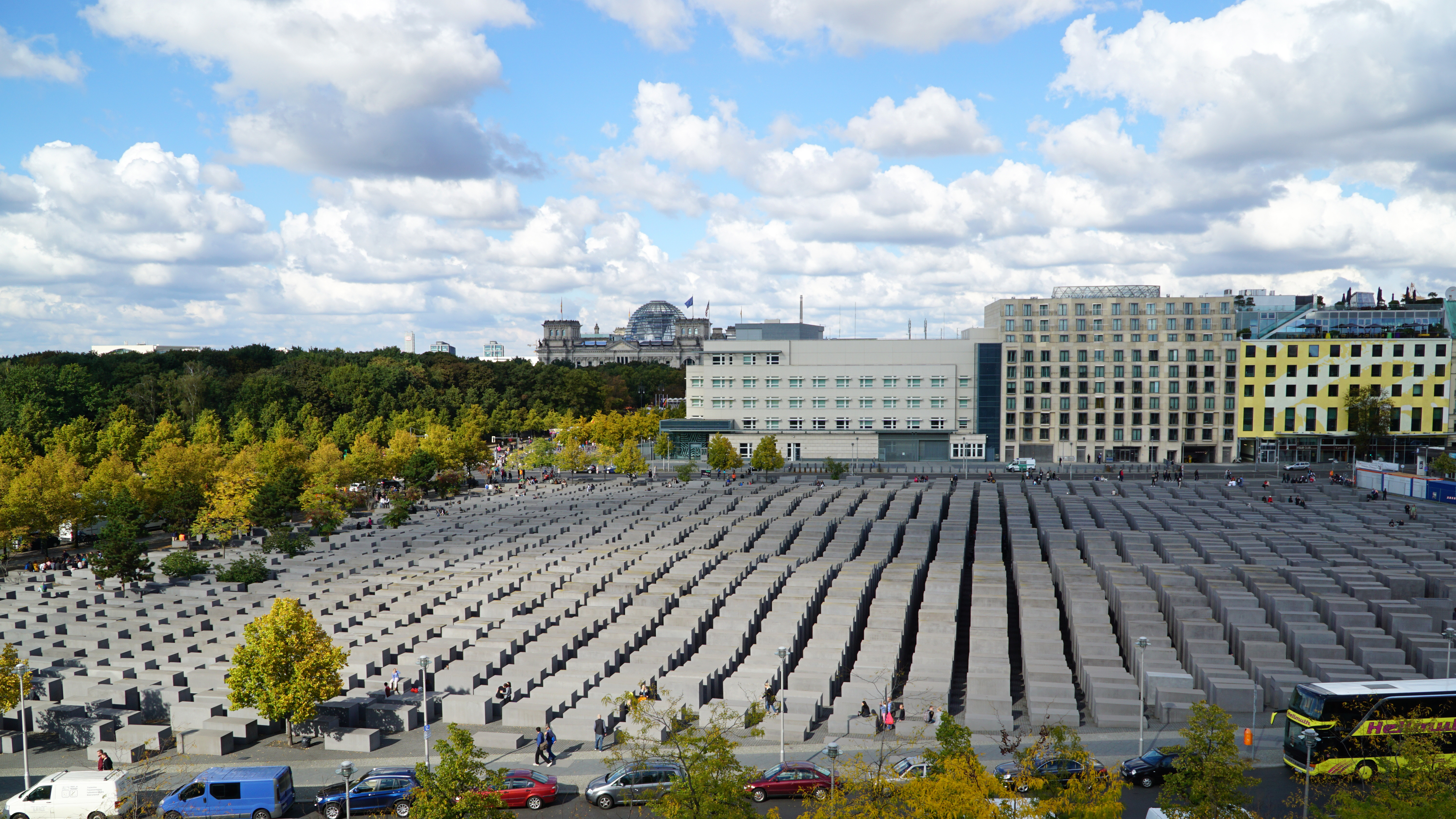
Memorial to the Murdered Jews of Europe in Berlin, 2016

In the decades after the war, Holocaust memory was largely confined to the survivors and their communities. The popularity of Holocaust memory peaked in the 1990s after the fall of Communism, and became central to Western historical consciousness as a symbol of the ultimate human evil. Genocide scholar A. Dirk Moses stated that "the Holocaust has gradually supplanted genocide as modernity's icon of evil", while political scientist Scott Straus said that "the Holocaust, perhaps more than any other event in the past century, represents the pinnacle of evil". The Holocaust has been described as "perhaps the most savage and significant single crime in recorded history" and that of the most barbaric events in the twentieth century "the Holocaust probably ranks as the very worst". Renowned German historian Wolfgang Benz described it as "the singularly most monstrous crime committed in the history of mankind". Holocaust education, in which its advocates argue promotes citizenship while reducing prejudice generally, became widespread at the same time. International Holocaust Remembrance Day is commemorated each year on 27 January, while some other countries have set a different memorial day. It has been commemorated in memorials, museums, and speeches, as well as works of culture such as novels, poems, films, and plays. Holocaust denial is a criminal offense in some countries; though various Middle Eastern governments, figures and media promote it.

Although many are convinced that there are lessons or some kind of redemptive meaning to be drawn from the Holocaust, whether this is the case and what these lessons are is disputed. Communist states marginalized the topic of antisemitic persecution while eliding their nationals' collaboration with Nazism, a tendency that continued into the post-communist era. In West Germany, a self-critical memory of the Holocaust developed in the 1970s and 1980s, and spread to some other western European countries. The national memories of the Holocaust were extended to the European Union as a whole, in which Holocaust memory has provided both shared history and an emotional rationale for committing to human rights. Participation in this memory is required of countries seeking entry. In contrast to Europe, in the United States the memory of the Holocaust tends to be more abstract and universalized. During South African apartheid, the Holocaust was evoked widely and divergently, by Jews and non-Jews alike. Whether Holocaust memory actually promotes human rights is disputed. In Israel, the memory of the Holocaust has been used at times to justify the use of force and violation of international human rights norms, in particular as part of the Israeli–Palestinian conflict.

The Holocaust is the most well-known genocide in history, and is considered to be the single most infamous case of genocide in European history as well. It is the single most documented and studied genocide in history. It is also seen as the archetype of genocide and the benchmark in genocide studies.

The scholarly literature on the Holocaust is massive, encompassing thousands of books. The tendency to see the Holocaust as a unique or incomprehensible event continues to be popular among the broader public after being largely rejected by historians. Omer Bartov points out how the Holocaust was unique in that it was "the industrial killing of millions of human beings in factories of death, ordered by a modern state, organized by a conscientious bureaucracy, and supported by a law-abiding, patriotic 'civilized' society." Another debate concerns whether the Holocaust emerged from Western civilization or was an aberration of it.

The Jewish population still remains below pre-Holocaust levels. According to the Central Bureau of Statistics of Israel, the world Jewish population reached 15.2 million by the end of 2020—approximately 1.4 million less than on the eve of the Holocaust in 1939, when the number was 16.6 million.

== See also ==
- Bibliography of the Holocaust
- Outline of the Holocaust
