= A World Without Jews =

2014 book by Alon Confino

- Author: Alon Confino
- Publisher: Yale University Press
- Publication date: 2014
- ISBN: 9780300212518

A World Without Jews: The Nazi Imagination from Persecution to Genocide is a 2014 book by Alon Confino published by Yale University Press, which seeks to explain Nazi antisemitism and the Holocaust by looking into the imaginations and fantasies of Nazis. It received mixed reviews in scholarly and popular publications. Some reviewers praised Confino's analysis for its originality, while others criticize it for making assertions that are not sufficiently backed by evidence.

== Contents ==
Confino dismisses some widely accepted explanations for Nazism, especially those that heavily emphasize racism, as too simplistic. He focuses on the period 1933–1939 and on public actions and statements. His answer to the question of why the Nazis committed genocide against the Jews is that "Jews represented time, symbolizing evil historical origins that had to be eradicated for Nazi civilization to arise." This opens up new areas of analysis: imagination and fantasy as well as ideology.

Rather than stressing racism, Confino proposes that Nazi antisemitism transcended racism, even in its use of so-called scientific racism. Instead, Nazism twisted ideas about science and race to accommodate an extreme antisemitism partly derived from Christian antisemitism. What was more important than scientific racism was telling a story about national origins.

Confino rejects the idea, promoted by some historians and Christian apologists, that the Nazis sought to eradicate Christianity: "Their aim was not to eradicate Christianity but to eradicate Christianity’s Jewish roots". This aim was based in an extreme version of supersessionism that would end the conflict between the contradictory truth claims of Judaism and Christianity. Hitler used the anti-Jewish struggle to justify World War II: "Jews gave the overall meaning to the Nazi fight between good and evil: the messianic struggle to create a Nazi civilization depended on the extermination of the Jews." When the Nazis burned Torah scrolls during Kristallnacht in November 1938, he contends, they severed a key link with the past and made it possible for both Germans and Jews to imagine "a world without Jews."

Instead of focusing on concrete anti-Jewish policies, Confino explores the "sensibilities and emotions" that lay behind them. In so doing, he verges into a psychoanalytic analysis of Nazi leaders, although he avoids "blatantly Freudian terminology."

Confino also tries to steer a middle path between approaches that present Nazi antisemitism as a rupture with the past and those that view it as an extension of previous phenomena. Although he argues that "The Holocaust was the first experiment in a new humanity achieved by extermination, a humanity liberated from the shackles of its own past," he also contends the Nazis' actions were rooted in centuries of Christian tradition. Controversially, he asserts that the rupture with the past carries over into Holocaust memory, where "extermination as a sort of genesis" has continued: "The Holocaust has haunted the postwar imagination because the European-wide extermination provided for Jews, Germans, and Europeans a story of origins and new beginning".

== Reception ==
David Cesarani praised the book, although he found it to gloss over some detail of anti-Jewish persecution which would have complicated Confino's argument. He praised Confino's "thought-provoking" analysis of speeches by Hitler, Himmler, and Goebbels from 1941 to 1945. Cesarani writes that Confino's book will appeal to those who believe that the Holocaust was unique. Israeli historian Amos Goldberg stated that "A World Without Jews is to my mind one of the most important books on the Holocaust to be published in recent years; it constitutes both a methodological and a historical breakthrough".

In a positive review, Ferenc Laczó describes the book as "a path-breaking cultural historical analysis of Nazi sensibilities, fantasies, and agendas" and praises its "innovative and insightful interpretation." However, he has "minor reservations" about the book's tendency to generalize and overlook heterogeneity in German society and states that the book lacks a "thorough grounding in social history".

Richard Steigmann-Gall writes that the book is an outgrowth of Confino's earlier book, Foundational Pasts, which defended a culturalist understanding of the Nazi era and the Holocaust. He writes that "There is much to commend in Confino’s book" but that it suffers from lack of attention to detail in some areas, due to being composed as an extended essay rather than a monograph.

Susannah Heschel is more critical of the book, arguing that Confino does not justify his conclusions with sufficient evidence, often makes unhelpful generalizations, and fails to place developments in their historical context. She wrote that Confino often fails to credit others who did more in-depth research than he did, and came to the same conclusions first. She argues that Confino never answers the question raised in the subtitle, of how Nazism went "from persecution to genocide".

According to Jeffrey Herf Confino's book "displays repeated gaps between assertion and evidence." His method "impute[s] motivations and emotions to actors based on what they did, how they looked when they did it, and what they kept silent about"—which Herf argues is "dubious." Herf argues that Confino needs to do more research in archives to find evidence that would corroborate his conclusions.

There were several other reviews.
