= Alon Confino =

Israeli historian (1959–2024)

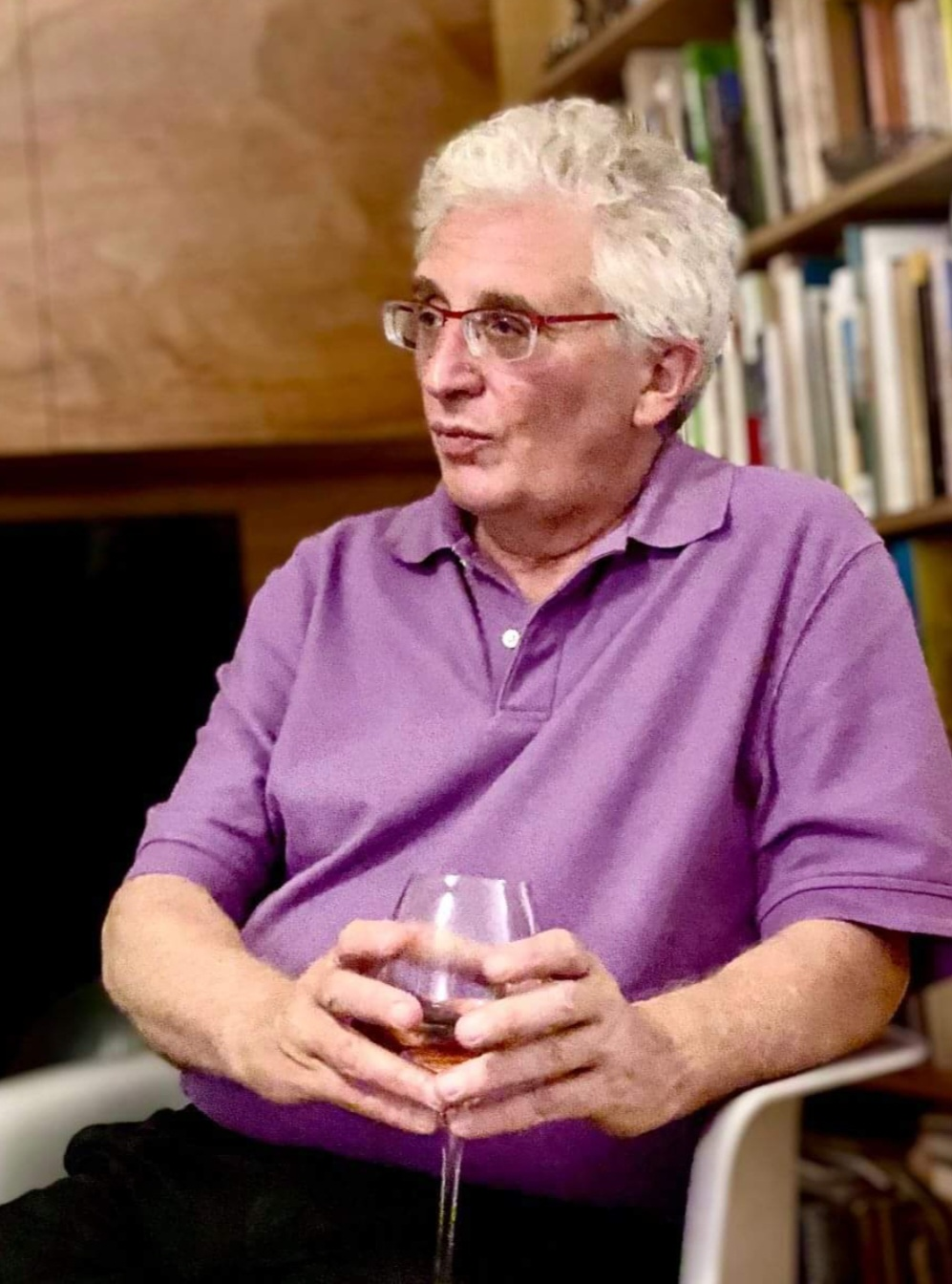
Alon Confino

Alon Confino (Hebrew: אלון קונפינו; April 1, 1959 – June 27, 2024) was an Israeli cultural historian. He served as the director of the Institute for Holocaust, Genocide, and Memory Studies and a Professor of History and Judaic Studies at University of Massachusetts Amherst.

Confino grew up in Jerusalem, and studied at the University of Tel Aviv (BA) and University of California, Berkeley (MA & PHD). He died on June 27, 2024, at the age of 65. He was a co-organizer and author of the Jerusalem Declaration on Antisemitism that was released in 2021.

== Works ==
- Confino, Alon (1997). The Nation as a Local Metaphor: Württemberg, Imperial Germany, and National Memory, 1871-1918. UNC Press Books. ISBN 978-0-8078-4665-0.
- Confino, Alon (2006). Germany As a Culture of Remembrance: Promises And Limits of Writing History. UNC Press Books. ISBN 978-0-8078-5722-9.
- Confino, Alon (2011). Foundational Pasts: The Holocaust as Historical Understanding. Cambridge University Press. ISBN 978-1-139-50218-4.
- Confino, Alon (2014). A World Without Jews: The Nazi Imagination from Persecution to Genocide. Yale University Press. ISBN 978-0-300-19046-5.
