= Purges of Nazi collaborators =

Purges of Nazi collaborators, sometimes called national cleansing, were widespread trials of people accused of collaborating with the Nazi occupiers in many European countries after World War II. As much as 2–3 percent of the population of Europe was affected by these trials, which were often held under special laws. Most of these trials did not emphasize crimes committed against Jews during the war.

Examples include:

- Legal purge in Norway after World War II
- Épuration légale in France
- Communist purges in Albania in 1944-1947
- August trials in Poland
- People's courts (Czechoslovakia) in Czechoslovakia
- Soviet trials of Nazi collaborators
