= Italian-occupied Europe =

Italian-occupied Europe may refer to:

- Italian occupation of France
  - Italian occupation of Corsica
- Italian occupation of Greece
- Italian occupation of Yugoslavia
