= Truth claim =

A truth claim is an assertion held to be true in a religious belief system; however, it does not follow that the assertion can be proven true. For example, a truth claim in Judaism is that only one God exists, while other religions are polytheistic. Conflicting truth claims between different religions can be a cause of religious conflict. The theory of truth claims has been advanced by John Hick.

== See also ==
- Religious views on truth

== Sources ==
- Brümmer, Vincent (6 May 2014). "On Three Ways to Justify Religious Beliefs". Ars Disputandi. 1 (1): 18–30. doi:10.1080/15665399.2001.10819708.
- Christian, William A. (January 1962). "Truth-Claims in Religion". The Journal of Religion. 42 (1): 52–62. doi:10.1086/485419. S2CID 170959610.
- Hick, John (1989). An Interpretation of Religion. Palgrave Macmillan. ISBN 978-0-333-39489-2.
- Hick, John, ed. (1974). Truth and Dialogue in World Religions: Conflicting Truth-claims. Westminster Press. ISBN 978-0-664-20713-7.
- Lipner, Julius (24 October 2008). "Truth-claims and inter-religious dialogue". Religious Studies. 12 (2): 217–230. doi:10.1017/S0034412500009185. S2CID 143563507.
- Meyer, Dirk (2015). "9 Truth Claim with no Claim to Truth: Text and Performance of the "Qiushui" Chapter of the Zhuangzi". Literary Forms of Argument in Early China. Brill. pp. 297–340. ISBN 9789004291607.
- Nielsen, Kai (1973). "Religious Truth-Claims and Faith". International Journal for Philosophy of Religion. 4 (1): 13–29. doi:10.1007/BF00138178. ISSN 0020-7047. JSTOR 40019175. S2CID 170740528.
- Rieger, Daniel Dale (1992). Religious truth-claims and the diversity of religious traditions (PhD dissertation). Syracuse University. ISBN 979-8-208-68777-2. ProQuest 304015141.
