= Rachel Zilberberg =

Polish Jewish activist

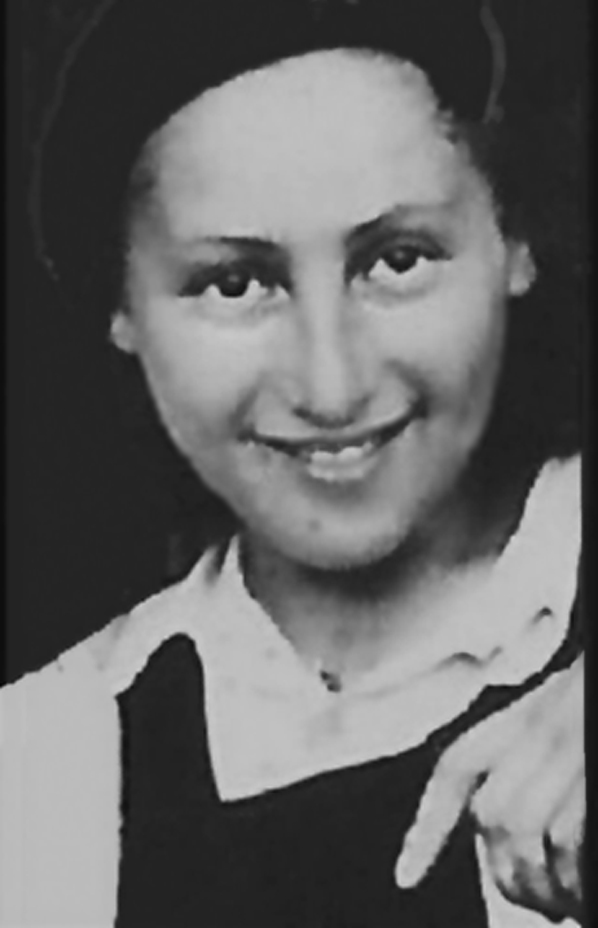
- Born: 5 January 1920; Warsaw, Poland
- Died: 8 May 1943 (aged 23); Warsaw, Nazi-occupied Poland
- Religion: Jewish

Rachel (Sarenka) Zylberberg (5 January 1920 – 8 May 1943) was an underground activist and participant in the Warsaw Ghetto Uprising. She held a key role in rousing the rebellion. Zylberberg was a member of Hashomer Hatzair, the Zionist-socialist youth movement. After the German invasion of Poland at the onset of World War II, she left the capital for Wilno in northeastern part of prewar Poland (now Vilnius, Lithuania), then returned to Warsaw together with Chajka (Chaikeh) Grossman and was actively involved in the Jewish resistance.

Sarenka (Little Roe deer, or Fawn in Polish) was one of the few leaders who actually reentered the besieged ghetto, rather than flee it. She was among the first to set out on an impassioned journey to spread knowledge of the Nazi plan to eradicate the Jews in the Holocaust. Sarenka confronted her peers repeatedly with this information, until she convinced Mira Fuchrer, Mordechai Anielewicz' partner, and eventually Anielewicz himself, as well as other leaders of the movement, of the severity of their situation.

In order to reenter the besieged ghetto and rejoin the Hashomer Hatzair Combat Unit, she gave up her daughter Maya, whose later history is unknown. She died in the bunker called Miła 18 beneath the 18 Miła Street in Warsaw, where her name is engraved on a memorial headstone together with those of other Jewish fighters. Rachel was more familiarly known as Sarenka, which translates into Hebrew as Ofra.

== Early life and education ==
Rachel Zylberberg was born Rachela Zylberberg on 5 January 1920 in Warsaw, interwar Poland, to Orthodox Jewish parents: Alexander (Sender) and Masha née Nordwind. Her parents owned a dairy-goods store at 37 Nowolipki Street, and later at 40a Nowolipki. Rachela Zylberberg studied at the Jewish Gymnasia and joined Hashomer Hatzair, where she became member of the "Frontline Brigade" eventually, along with Mordechai Anielewicz, Commander of the Warsaw Ghetto Uprising. While in school, she excelled at her studies and sports, and was known for her strong organizational abilities. As of 1938, she became a group leader for the younger students who greatly admired her. She received her matriculation certificate just as the Second World War broke out on 1 September 1939 with the German invasion of Poland. Two weeks later, the USSR invaded Poland from the east.

== In Soviet Lithuania ==
Sarenka escaped to eastern Poland ahead of the German advance, together with her sister Ruth. She initially arrived in Kaidani, which at the time was under the Russian control, joining Ha-Manof Kibbutz, and eventually relocating to prewar Wilno (Vilna) and joining the Hashomer Hatzair Kibbutz there. With her good education, she immediately adopted an important role in kibbutz life. She lived in Vilna with her partner, Moshe Kopito who himself was a close friend of Mordechai Anielewicz; the two men had joined the movement together much earlier.

On 22 February 1941, Sarenka's daughter Maya was born. On 22 June 1941 the German army attacked the Soviet positions in eastern Poland under the code-name Operation Barbarossa. Sarenka later described the 'deportation' of Jews from the Ghetto to nearby Ponary in the suburbs of Vilna, where the Ponary massacre was carried out by Nazi Germans and their Lithuanian collaborators. She wrote:

It was a night of horrors. We – the members of Hashomer Hatzair – hid in one apartment. We listened to the voices coming from the street. The Germans' vehicles stopped and then we heard voices, shouts, shots, heartrending crying. This is how they evacuated one street after another. To where? To the forests near the city, Ponar [Ponary], no doubt the valley of slaughter.

Sarenka moved into hiding at the Polish Dominican Convent of the Little Sisters in a forest some 6 kilometres (3.7 mi) outside of Vilna (see: Anna Borkowska (Sister Bertranda), the Polish Righteous Among the Nations who saved them). Reportedly, Sarenka stayed there together with Abba Kovner and Joseph Shamir. In all, some fifteen to 20 comrades hid in the convent together. There, the idea of the uprising took shape, and became based around Kovner's declaration: "Let us not go like lambs to the slaughter!" The connection between the Hashomer Hatzair insurgents and the Catholic convent was arranged by Yodviga Dudezits with the assistance from Irena Adamowicz, later acknowledged as the Polish Righteous Among the Nations by Yad Vashem. Both women belonged to the Polish Scouts Democratic Movement, and both had been hidden by Hashomer Hatzair activists when the city was destroyed by the Russians.

After Moshe Kopito was murdered by the Nazis while attempting to buy milk and supplies for their daughter, Sarenka placed Maya at an orphanage in Vilna, under the name Yodviga (Jadwiga) Sogak. Maya (whose whereabouts are not known) is still being sought to this day. At that time, the Hashomer Hatzair leadership in Vilna decided to return Sarenka to Warsaw for partisan action. Chaikeh (Chajka) Grossman was sent by the movement to bring Sarenka back to the capital. Sarenka dressed up as Chaikeh's child even though they both were young, but Chaikeh was the elder of the two. Chaikeh later wrote: "This time I didn't come to Warsaw alone. I came with Sarenka. I needed to get Sarenka from Vilna to Warsaw, after the catastrophe with Moshe Kopito, her friend. We decided to transfer her to a family in Warsaw and have her join the action there." The purpose of Sarenka's return was to continue leading the youth remaining inside the ghetto, and to assist her family with their grocery store inside the Warsaw Ghetto.

== Death in the Warsaw Ghetto ==
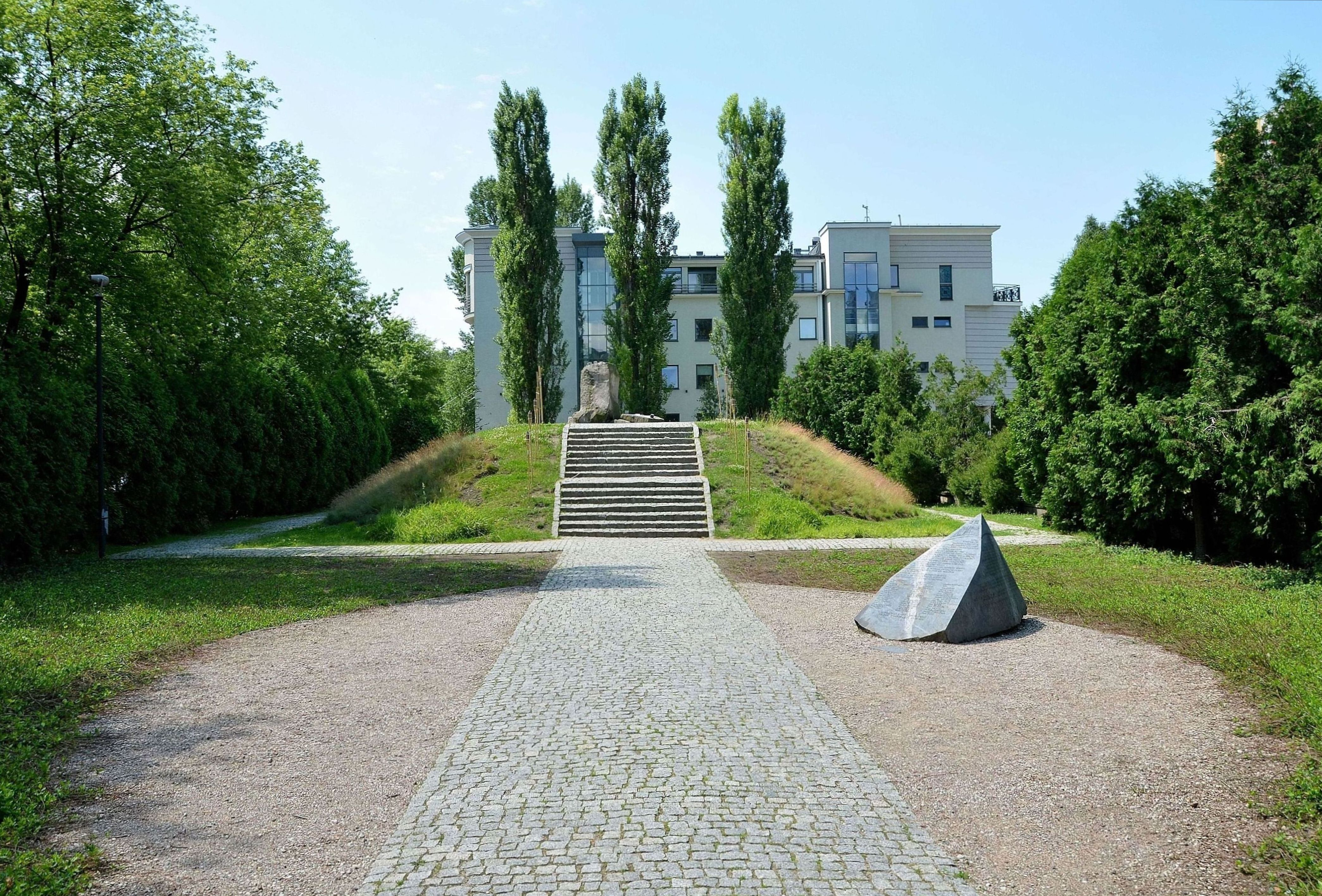
General view of Miła 18 memorial in Warsaw, place of death of Sarenka

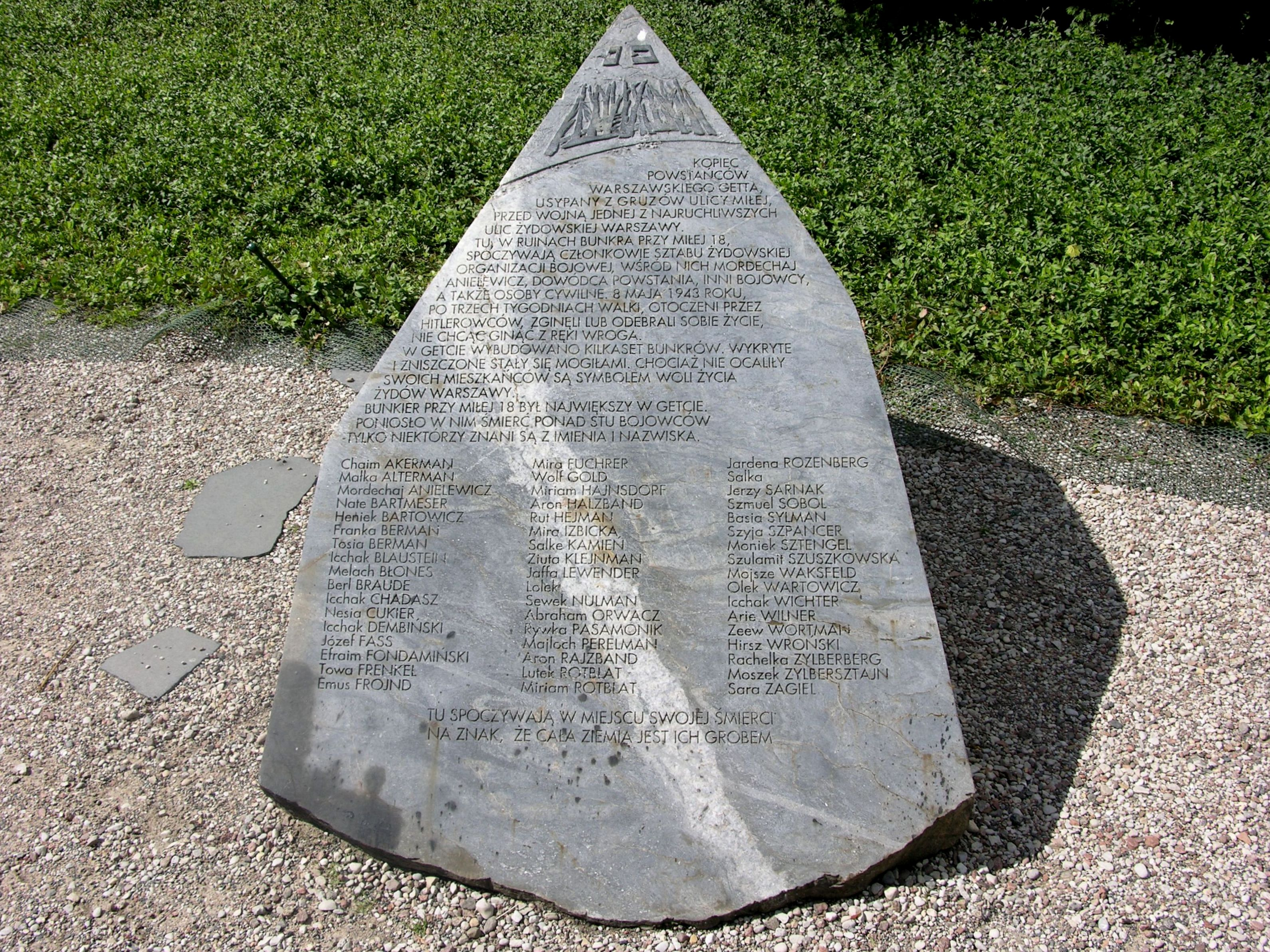
Names of the Jewish fighters which includes Rachel (Sarenka) Zilberberg on the obelisk at Miła 18 memorial in Warsaw - right row, 3rd from the bottom

Sarenka reentered the Warsaw Ghetto in January 1942, with two objectives. The first was to bear the message, as an eyewitness, of the methodical extermination of Jews in Punar, near Vilna; her fellow Jews had not heard these details until then. The second was to arouse and motivate rebellion against the Nazis from inside the ghetto. On her return to the ghetto, a group of youth united around her, some of whom she had instructed as a counselor. She detailed the Nazi massacre.

One day we were called to our brigade meeting with the new young woman delegate from the Vilna Ghetto. I think her name was Sarenka (or perhaps Rachel)? We all sat on the floor and before us stood a young woman, about 22 years old, whose hair already showed white streaks. In the twilight she looked so pretty and noble, but her eyes seemed extinguished.

She described her experience of the removal of Jews by the Nazis for massacre.

She died in the bunker under Miła 18, where her name is engraved.

== Sources ==
- The Book of Jewish Partisans, Volume 2: 707
- Chiakeh Grossman, "The Underground Activists". Moreshet Publishers, 1965: 109
- Aliza Vitis Shomron, "Youth In Flames", pgs. 74-75
- Moshe Domb, "Schmelzownik", Moreshet Publishers, 2000
- Professor Dinah Porat "Holocaust and War", pg. 71
- Melech Neustadt "Destruction and Rebellion of the Warsaw Jews", 1946 pgs. 294-295
- Interview with Jack Fliederbaum, Tel Aviv, 2002
- Interview with Moshe Domb, Kfar Menahem, 2001
