= Anielewicz Bunker =

Underground bunker of the Jewish resistance in the Warsaw Ghetto during WW2

Coordinates: 52.2515°N 20.9923°E

- Bunkier Anielewicza
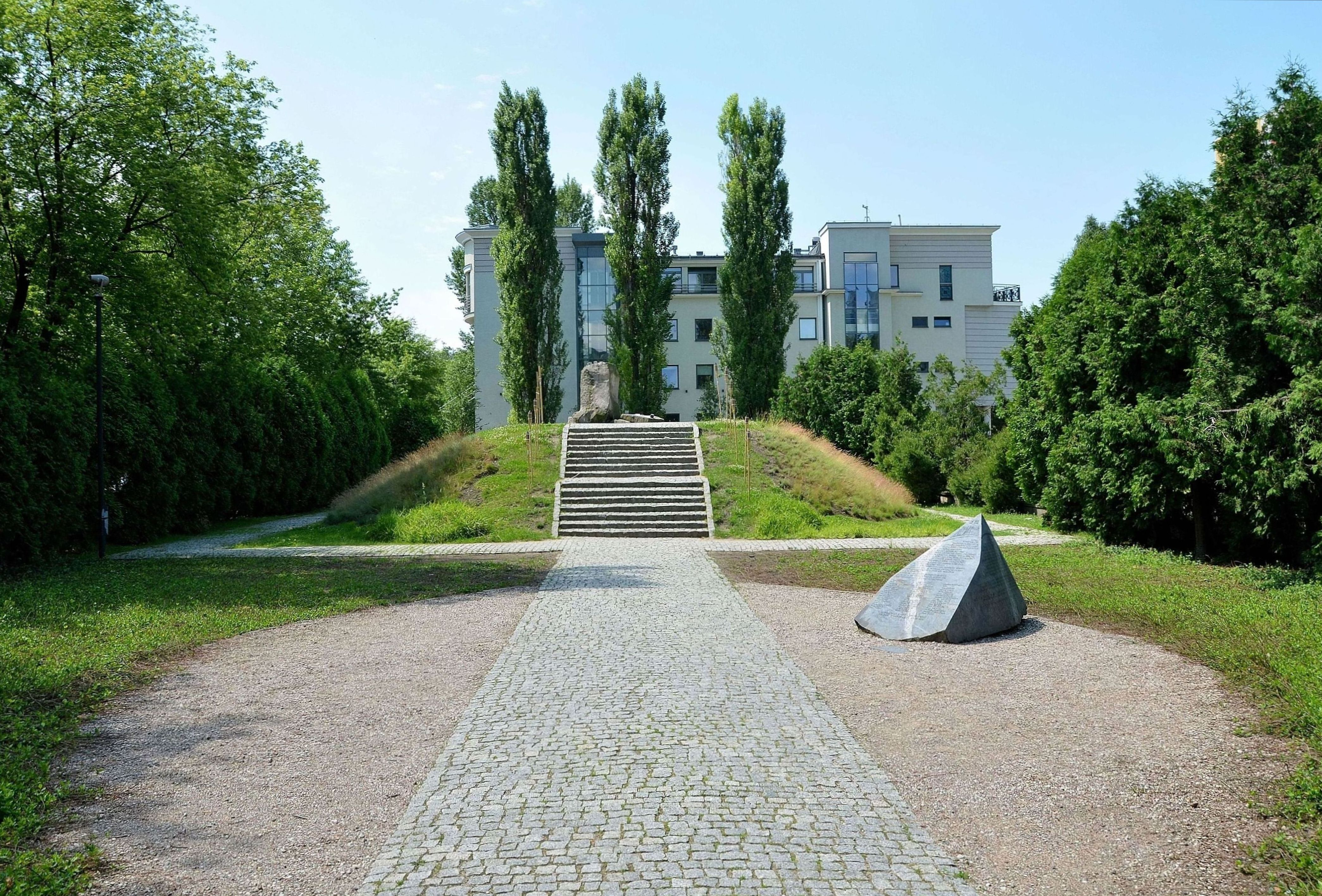
- View of Miła 18 Memorial
- Interactive map of Anielewicz Bunker
- Location: Warsaw, Poland
- Designer: Hanna Szmalenberg and Marek Moderau (obelisk); Unknown (commemorative stone)
- Material: Granite
- Beginning date: 1946
- Completion date: 1946, 2006

The Anielewicz Bunker (Polish: Bunkier Anielewicza), also known as the Anielewicz Mound (Polish: Kopiec Anielewicza), was the headquarters and hidden shelter of the Jewish Combat Organization (ŻOB), a Jewish resistance group in the Warsaw Ghetto in Poland during the Nazi German occupation of World War II.

== Background ==
In October 1940, the governor of Nazi German-occupied Warsaw ordered city officials to begin construction of a ghetto for Jews in an area of Warsaw formerly used for quarantine during epidemics; it was completed on 15 November 1940. The initial population of Jews confined to the ghetto was 400,000. All windows, doors, and other exits to the rest of Warsaw were bricked up. From July to October 1942, over 310,300 Jews were removed from the ghetto, for transport to extermination camps or due to death.

From 17 April 1943 to 18 May 1943, SS Brigadefuehrer Jürgen Stroop reported to SS-Obergruppenfuehrer and General of Police Krueger that 56,065 of the remaining Jews of the Warsaw ghetto were deported to death camps or exterminated by gunshot, explosion, fire, or asphyxiation.

== Warsaw Ghetto Uprising ==
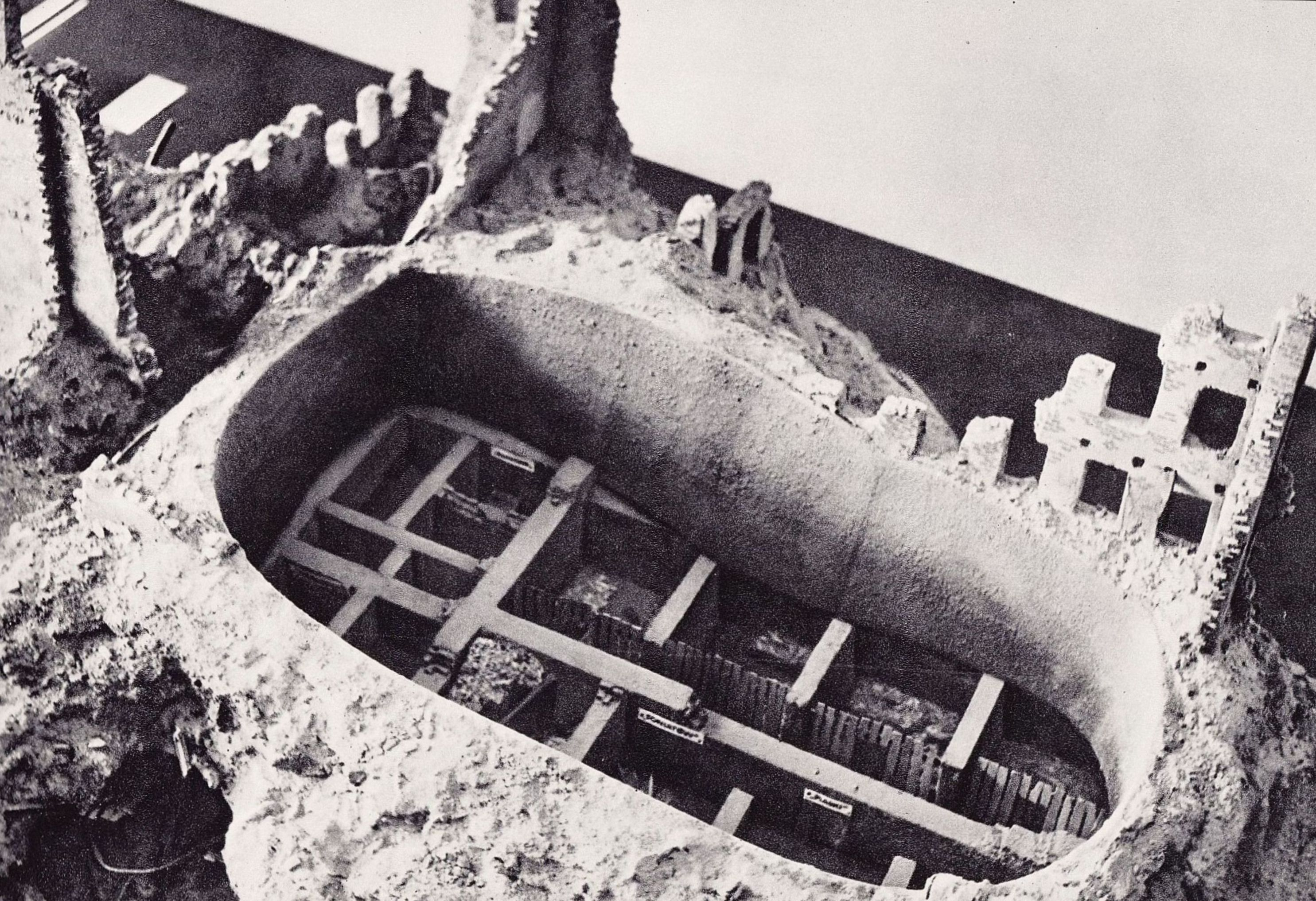
Postwar reconstruction of the Miła 18 bunker

The bunker at Miła 18 was initially constructed by a group of Polish partisans and armed underground resistance fighters against the Germans. They were joined there by the ŻOB fighters after their hideout, at 29 Miła Street, had been discovered.

On 8 May 1943, three weeks after the start of the Warsaw Ghetto Uprising, when the bunker beneath 18 Mila Street was found by the Nazis, there were around 300 people living there. The bunker had six exits.

From the Stroop Report, 7 May 1943:

The location of the [Mila Street bunker] is now known. It is to be forced open tomorrow... On the average the raiding parties shoot 30 to 50 Jews each night... Today we blew up a concrete building which we had not been able to destroy by fire. In this operation we learned that the blowing up of a building is a very lengthy process and takes an enormous amount of explosives. The best and only method for destroying the Jews therefore still remains the setting of fires.

The armed resistance fighters surrendered, but the ŻOB command, including Mordechaj Anielewicz, the leader of the Warsaw Ghetto uprising, stood firm. The Nazis threw tear gas into the shelter to force the occupants out. Anielewicz, his girlfriend Mira Fuchrer and many of his staff committed mass suicide by ingesting poison rather than surrender, though a group of about 30 eluded the SS by escaping through the only un-blocked door of the six. They crawled through the Ghetto via a sewer until they were able to emerge near Prosta Street on the "Aryan side" of Warsaw on May 10, 1943.

From the Stroop Report, 8 May 1943:

The whole Ghetto was searched today by raiding parties... [We] are resolved not to terminate the large-scale operation until the last Jew has been destroyed.

== Remembrance ==
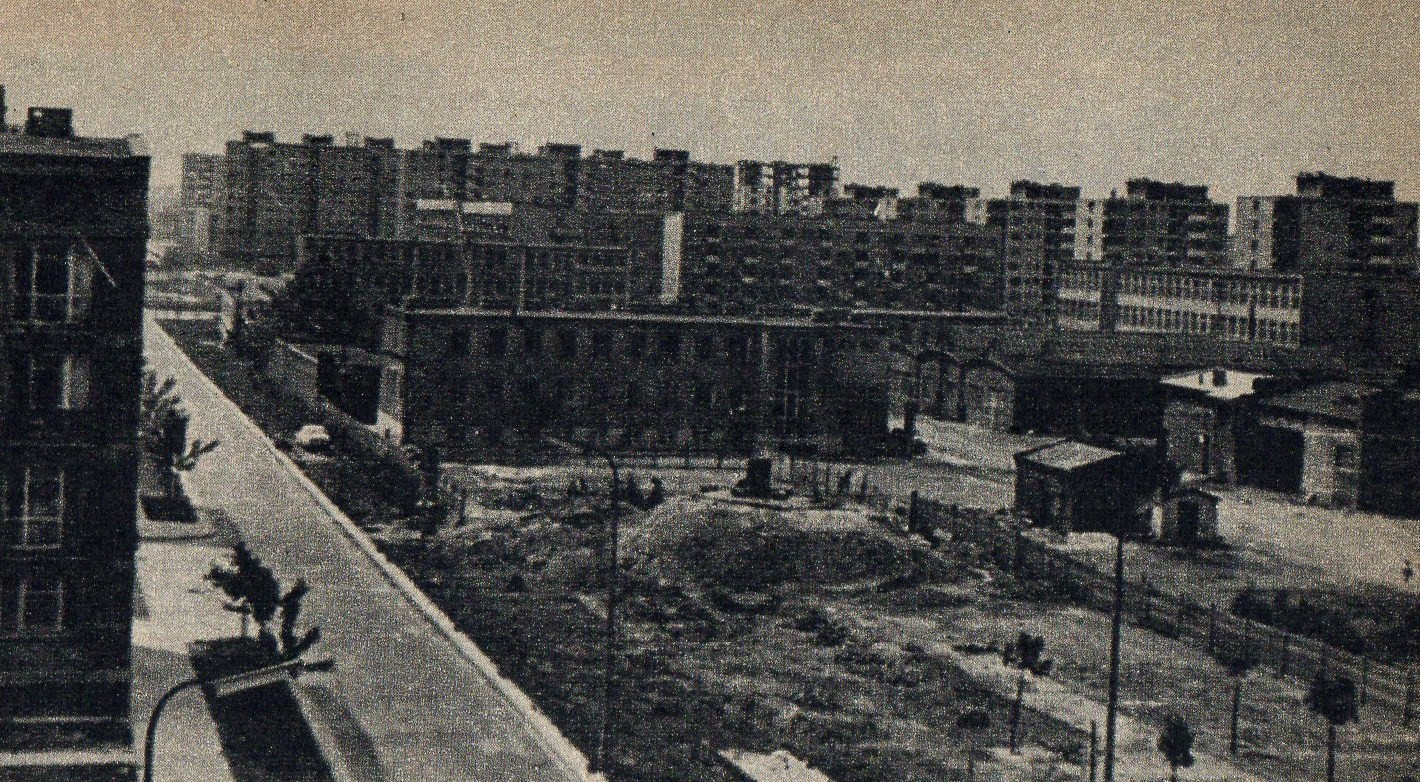
Miła 18 memorial in 1964

In July 1945, survivors of the Jewish Underground (among them Simcha Rotem) visited the ruins above the former ZOB command bunker. The ruins were not built over, so as "not to disturb what is recognized as a grave site by the Jewish community".

In 1946, the monument known as Anielewicz Mound, made of the rubble of Miła Street houses, was erected. A commemorative stone inscribed in Polish and Yiddish was placed on top of the mound.

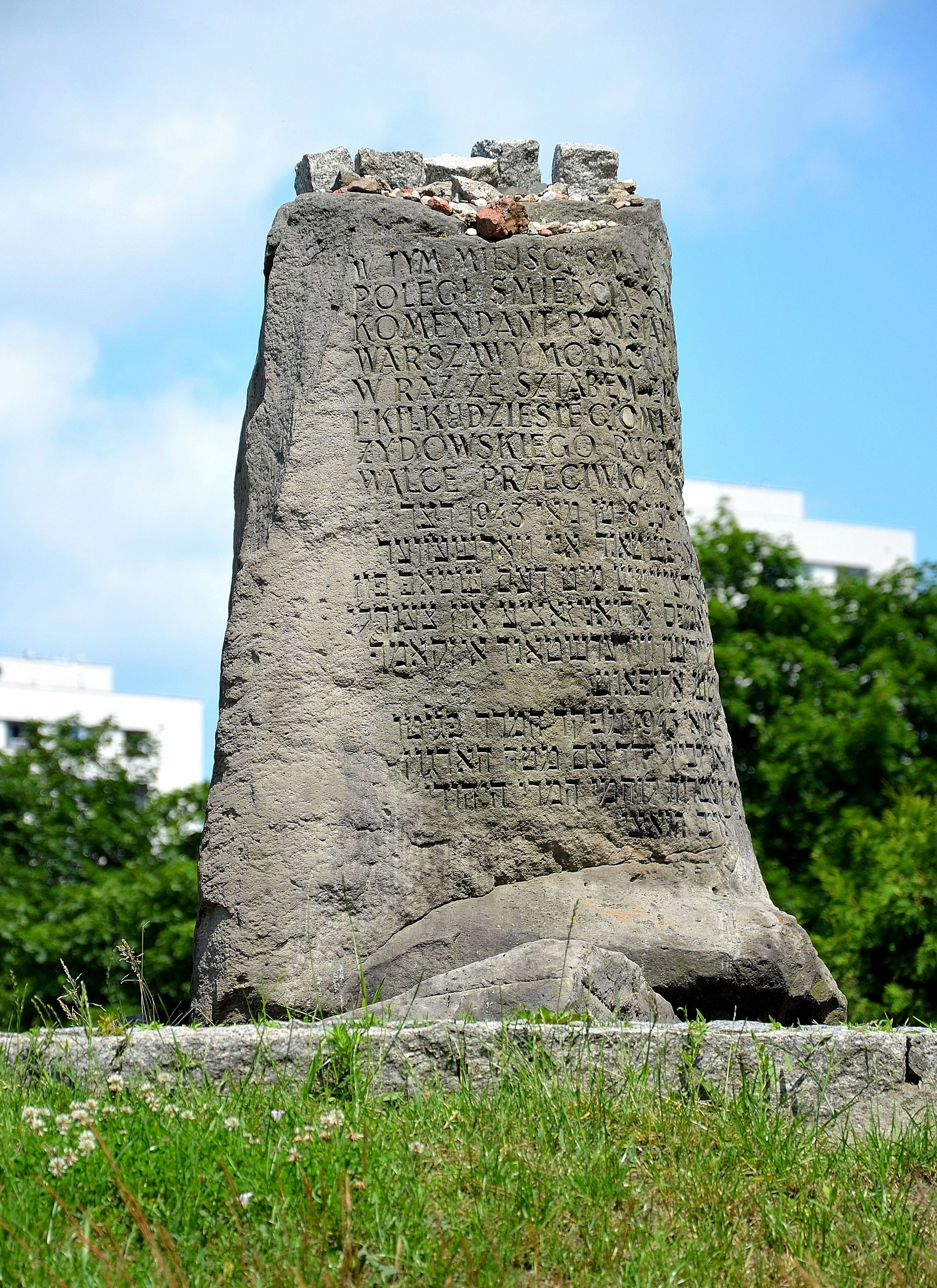
Commemorative stone on top of the mound, visible stones put by Jewish visitors

In 2006, a new obelisk designed by Hanna Szmalenberg and Marek Moderau was added to the memorial. The inscription in Polish, English and Yiddish reads:

Grave of the fighters of the Warsaw Ghetto Uprising built from the rubble of Miła Street, one of the liveliest streets of pre-war Jewish Warsaw. These ruins of the bunker at 18 Miła Street are the place of rest of the commanders and fighters of the Jewish Combat Organization, as well as some civilians. Among them lies Mordechaj Anielewicz, the Commander in Chief. On May 8, 1943, surrounded by the Nazis after three weeks of struggle, many perished or took their own lives, refusing to perish at the hands of their enemies. There were several hundred bunkers built in the Ghetto. Found and destroyed by the Nazis, they became graves. They could not save those who sought refuge inside them, yet they remain everlasting symbols of the Warsaw Jews’ will to live. The bunker at Miła Street was the largest in the ghetto. It is the place of rest of over one hundred fighters, only some of whom are known by name. Here they rest, buried as they fell, to remind us that the whole earth is their grave.

The names of 51 Jewish fighters whose identities have been established by historians are engraved on the front of the obelisk.

Non-invasive surveys confirming subsurface evidence of the bunker and tunnel systems were carried out in 2021 by the Society of Exploration Geophysicists.

The current numbering of the buildings on Mila Street does not correspond to the wartime numbering. The memorial is now located at the intersection of Miła and Dubois Streets while the current Miła 18 is an apartment block about 700 metres to the west.

== Jewish fighters who died at Miła 18 ==
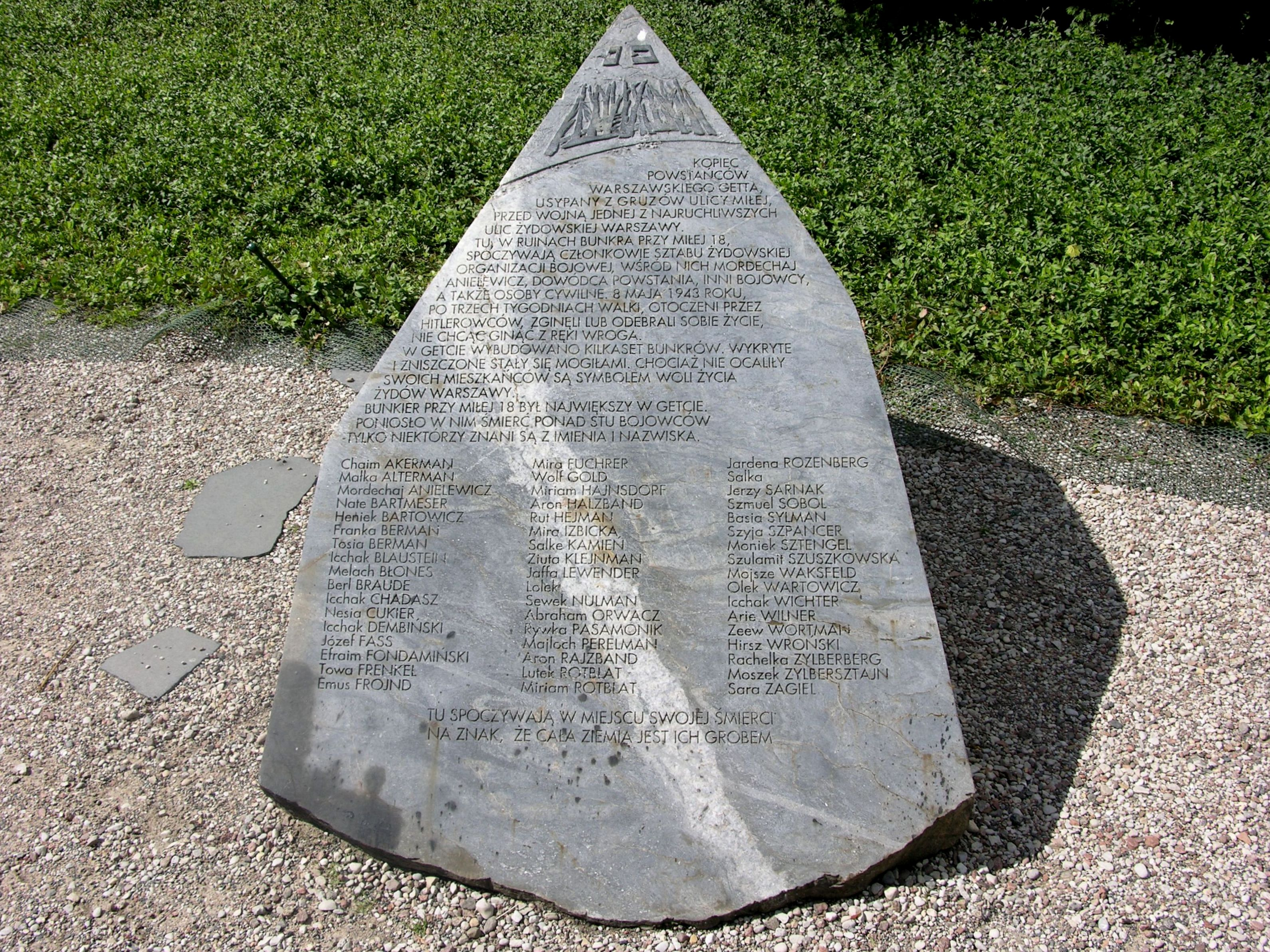
Obelisk at the foot of the mound with the names of 51 Jewish fighters

- Chaim Akerman
- Małka Alterman
- Mordechaj Anielewicz
- Nate Bartmeser
- Heniek Bartowicz
- Franka Berman
- Tosia Berman
- Icchak Blaustein
- Melach Błones
- Berl Braude
- Icchak Chadasz
- Nesia Cukier
- Icchak Dembiński
- Józef Fass
- Efraim Fondamiński
- Towa Frenkel
- Emus Frojnd
- Mira Fuchrer
- Wolf Gold
- Miriam Hajnsdorf
- Aron Halzband
- Rut Hejman
- Mira Izbicka
- Salke Kamień
- Ziuta Klejnman
- Jaffa Lewender
- Lolek (first name only)
- Sewek Nulman
- Abraham Orwacz
- Rywka Pasamonik
- Majloch Perelman
- Aron Rajzband
- Lutek Rotblat
- Miriam Rotblat
- Jardena Rozenberg
- Salka (first name only)
- Jerzy Sarnak
- Szmuel Sobol
- Basia Sylman
- Szyja Szpancer
- Moniek Sztengel
- Szulamit Szuszkowska
- Mojsze Waksfeld
- Olek Wartowicz
- Icchak Wichter
- Arie Wilner
- Zeew Wortman
- Hirsz Wroński
- Rachelka Zylberberg
- Moszek Zylbersztajn
- Sara Żagiel

== See also ==
- Siege of Masada
- Warsaw Uprising Monument
