= Chase Varnes =

American singer and songwriter

- Born: August 28, 2011 (age 15); Vancouver Island, British Columbia, Canada
- Genres: Country; pop
- Occupations: Singer; songwriter
- Instruments: Vocals; guitar; piano; drums
- Years active: 2025–present
- Website: www.chasevarnes.com

Chase Varnes (born August 28, 2011) is a Canadian singer and songwriter. He auditioned for America's Got Talent in 2025 and began a career in music directly afterward, with his first single Ain't Been There Yet released in July 2026.

== Early life ==
Chase Varnes was born in British Columbia, Canada, and grew up on a farm. He began learning the drums at an early age, and self-taught himself the guitar. After learning several covers, he started performing locally and soon garnered a fanbase. Fans posted clips of his performances online and soon after his social media presence took off.

== Career ==
In June 2025, Varnes auditioned for America's Got Talent where he received votes from three out of the four judges. Howie Mandel praised Varnes' performance and said that he reminded him of a young Justin Bieber. Varnes' performed Life Goes On by Ed Sheeran, which became a breakout moment of the episode.

In November 2025, Varnes was chosen as the opener for four-time Canadian Country Music Association winner Lisa Brokop.

In June 2026, he released his debut single Ain't Been There Yet. He writes and performs his own original music and plans to release an EP.

== Artistry ==
Varnes describes his style as "pop country" and cites Zach Bryan, Luke Combs, and Ed Sheeran as influences.

== Discography ==
=== Singles ===
List of singles, with year released and album name
Title	Year	Album
"Ain't Been There Yet"	2026	Non-album single
