= Uprising (2001 film) =

2001 American TV series

- VHS cover
- Written by: Jon Avnet; Paul Brickman
- Directed by: Jon Avnet
- Starring: Leelee Sobieski; Hank Azaria; David Schwimmer; Jon Voight; Donald Sutherland
- Theme music composer: Maurice Jarre
- Country of origin: United States
- Original language: English

Production
- Executive producers: Jon Avnet; Raffaella De Laurentiis; Bill Haber
- Producers: Jon Avnet; Jordan Kerner
- Cinematography: Denis Lenoir
- Editor: Sabrina Plisco
- Running time: 177 minutes
- Production companies: Brooklyn Films; Avnet/Kerner Productions; Raffaella Productions

Original release
- Network: NBC
- Release: November 4, 2001

Uprising is an American 2001 war drama television film about the Warsaw Ghetto Uprising during the Holocaust. The film was directed by Jon Avnet and written by Avnet and Paul Brickman. It was first aired on the NBC television network over two consecutive nights in November 2001.

== Plot ==
On 1 September 1939, Germany invades Poland, after which a regulation was promulgated that all Polish Jews should move to the new Warsaw Ghetto. As in all the ghettos, a Judenrat was appointed and was responsible for the administration of the ghetto. The film tells the moral dilemmas faced by Adam Czerniaków, head of the Judenrat in Warsaw, who had to carry out orders of the German authorities, including sending Jews to the Treblinka extermination camp.

A group of Polish Jews decide to rebel against the Germans and not to lend a hand to the murder of their brethren. They begin to organize their people to protect the honor of the Jewish people. Czerniaków, as the leader of the Judenrat, objects to this activity, fearing German reprisals against the Jews in the ghetto. By the close of 1942, people living in the ghetto realize they are doomed as deportations to Treblinka began. The rudiments of resistance are planned by Mordechai Anielewicz together with Yitzhak Zuckerman who laid the foundation for the Jewish Combat Organization, Zydowska Organizacja Bojowa (ZOB).

The film illustrates the moral dilemmas of members of the Jewish Combat Organization during the preparations for the revolt: "How to remain moral, in an immoral society?" On January 18, 1943, Germans raid the ghetto again but this time the Jews resist. The Jewish Combat Organization stops the German raids into the ghetto. Germans return on 19 April 1943, and the Warsaw Ghetto Uprising begins. In the intervening time, many of the ghetto residents construct hidden shelters or bunkers in the basements and cellars of the buildings, often with tunnels leading to other buildings. The handful of fighters who have weapons take to these shelters, giving the uprising the advantage of defensive positions.

== Cast ==
- Leelee Sobieski as Tosia Altman
- Hank Azaria as Mordechai Anielewicz
- David Schwimmer as Yitzhak Zuckerman
- Jon Voight as Maj. Gen. Jürgen Stroop
- Donald Sutherland as Adam Czerniaków
- Stephen Moyer as Simcha "Kazik" Rotem
- Sadie Frost as Zivia Lubetkin
- Radha Mitchell as Mira Fuchrer
- Mili Avital as Devorah Baron
- Eric Lively as Arie Wilner
- Alexandra Holden as Frania Beatus
- John Ales as Marek Edelman
- Andy Nyman as Calel Wasser (loosely based on Izrael Kanal)
- Nora Brickman as Clara Linder
- Jesper Christensen as Gen. Friedrich Krüger
- Cary Elwes as Dr. Fritz Hippler
- Palle Granditsky as Dr. Janusz Korczak
- Luke Mably as Zachariah Artenstein
- Ben Crystal as Julian Wald
- Gerd Böckmann as Commissar Heinz Auerswald
- Peter Rasez as Captain Szerynski (based on Ghetto Police commander Józef Szeryński)

== Filming ==
The movie was filmed in multiple locations, including Bratislava, Slovakia and Innsbruck in Tyrol, Austria.

== Music ==
The film's soundtrack was the last film score composed by Maurice Jarre, and prominently features the work of Max Bruch, including his Violin Concerto No. 1 during the opening and closing sequence.

== Alternate titles ==
The French title for the film is 1943, l'ultime révolte. The German title for the film is Uprising: Der Aufstand. The Polish title for the film is Powstanie.

== Accolades ==
In 2002, the film received the following awards:

- Primetime Emmy Award for Best Stunt Coordination category
- American Society of Cinematographers Award for Outstanding Achievement in Cinematography in Movies of the Week/Mini-Series/Pilot (Network)
- Christopher Award for Television & Cable
- Golden Reel Award for Best Sound Editing in Television - Dialogue & ADR, Long Form
- Political Film Society Awards for Exposé

== See also ==
- Mila 18
- List of Holocaust films
- Vladka Meed
