= Mira Fuchrer =

Resistance fighter in the Warsaw Ghetto Uprising

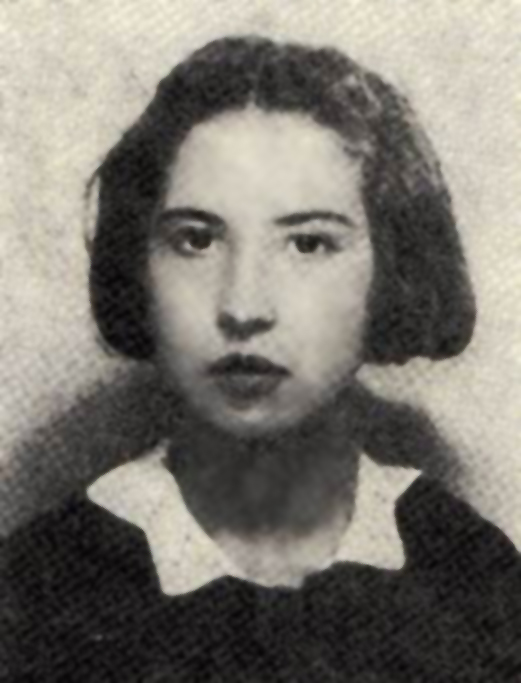
- Born: 1920; Warsaw, Poland
- Died: 8 May 1943 (aged 22-23); Warsaw, General Government
- Cause of death: KIA
- Known for: Member of the Jewish Combat Organization (ŻOB), resistance fighter during the Warsaw Ghetto Uprising
- Awards: Silver Cross of the Virtuti Militari (posthumously)

Mira Fuchrer (Yiddish: מירע פֿוכרער; Hebrew: מירה פוכרר; 1920 – 8 May 1943) was a Polish Jewish activist of the Jewish resistance movement in the Warsaw Ghetto during the occupation of Poland in World War II; member of the Jewish Combat Organization (ŻOB), and resistance fighter during the Warsaw Ghetto Uprising of 1943. Surrounded by the Germans and their Trawniki auxiliaries in the Anielewicz Bunker, she refused to surrender and committed suicide with the other members of the Jewish resistance.

== Life ==
Mira Fuchrer was born to Jewish parents in Warsaw in 1920. She was active in Hashomer Hatzair youth organization in the interwar period, where she met the future commander of ŻOB Mordechai Anielewicz. During the Nazi-Soviet invasion of Poland at the onset of World War II, Mira and Mordechai got together and fled to Wilno in the northeastern part of prewar Poland (now Vilnius, Lithuania) in September 1939. They returned to Warsaw in January 1940, and began transforming Hashomer Hatzair into the resistance movement. In November of the same year, they joined the fate of other Jewish citizens of Warsaw trapped in the newly formed ghetto. In the Warsaw Ghetto, Mira worked in a small tailor's shop along with her friends Towa Frenkel and Rachel Zilberberg. In 1942, she visited other ghettos in occupied Poland as a clandestine courier on behalf of ŻOB. During the Ghetto Uprising, which began on 19 April 1943, she fought in the so-called central ghetto sector. On May 8, 1943, she was in a bunker at 18 Mila Street together with Mordechai Anielewicz, Rachel Zilberberg, and a group of about 120 ZOB fighters when the bunker was discovered and surrounded by the Germans. Arie Wilner was the first to urge the fighters to commit suicide rather than surrender to the Germans. Most of the fighters shot themselves or took poison, including Mira and ZOB commander Mordechai Anielewicz.

== Memorial ==
Fuchrer was posthumously awarded the Silver Cross of the Military Order of Virtuti Militari by the decision of the President of the Polish People's Republic Bolesław Bierut in 1948. Mira Fuchrer's name was engraved on the obelisk set at the steps of the memorial known as Anielewicz Mound in 2006. Her name is listed among the 51 names of fighters whose identities were established by postwar historians.

In the 2001 television film Uprising, she was portrayed by Australian actress Radha Mitchell.

== Bibliography ==
- Grupińska, Anka (2000). Ciągle po kole. Rozmowy z żołnierzami getta warszawskiego. Warszawa: Wydawnictwo Twój Styl. p. 381. ISBN 83-7163-187-1.
- Lubetkin, Cywia (1999). Zagłada i powstanie. Warszawa: Wydawnictwo "Książka i Wiedza". p. 172. ISBN 83-05-13041-X.
- Kurzman, Dan (1993). The Bravest Battle: The 28 Days of the Warsaw Ghetto Uprising. Da Campo Press.
- Arens, Moshe (2019). Flags Over the Warsaw Ghetto. Independently published.

Media related to Mira Fuchrer at Wikimedia Commons
