= Yitzhak Suknik =

- יצחק סוקניק
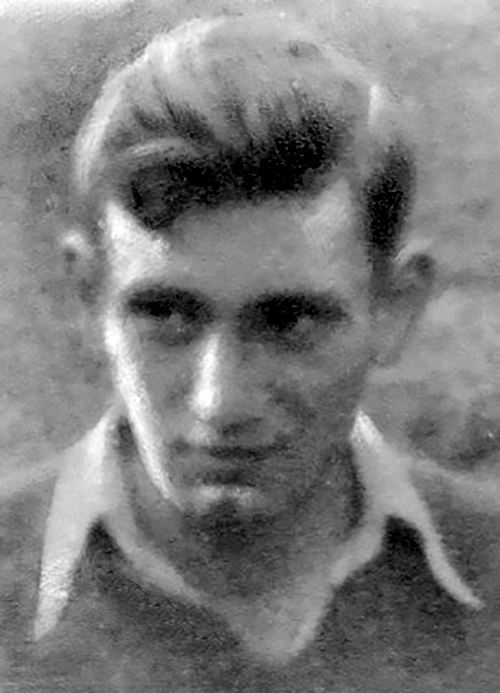
- Yitzhak "Koza" Suknik c. 1942
- Born: 1920; Warsaw, Poland
- Died: 8 May 1943 (aged 22–23); Warsaw, Poland

Yitzhak Suknik (Yiddish: יצחק סוקניק, 1920 – 8 May 1943), frequently known as Koza, was a fighter in the Jewish Combat Organization (Polish: Żydowska Organizacja Bojowa ŻOB). and a member of Hashomer Hatzair. He played a crucial role in the organisation and building of small arms to be used in the Warsaw Ghetto Uprising. He took part in the first action of the Warsaw Ghetto Uprising on January 18, 1943, saving the life of Mordechai Anielewicz. During the Uprising in April, he was a member of the fighting unit led by Mordechai Growas in the Central Ghetto, and known as an excellent marksman. He was killed on 8 May 1943 while trying to escape to the Aryan side of the city, via the sewers.

== Early life ==
Yitzhak was born in Warsaw, Poland in 1920. His family were middle-class Jews; his parents were Meier Suknik and Cesia (née Lament). They had two other sons Moszek, (born 1918) and Srul, (born 1926). Both his maternal and paternal families originated from the town of Chmielnik, approximately 32 kilometers south of the regional capital, Kielce in central Poland.

Suknik studied metalwork at the Vocational School on Stawki Street in Warsaw. He also completed his military service in the Polish army, having achieved the rank of sergeant, and was known as a distinguished marksman. Noted for his good temper and his cheerfulness, his friends nicknamed him Koza (goat), which remained his nom de guerre when he joined the Jewish Underground Movement. He was Member no.13 of "Ha-Shomer Ha-Tsa'ir" (השומר הצעיר). Just before the war, when Polish anti-Semitic attacks became more frequent on Warsaw streets, he and his friends would go out to protect Jewish pedestrians.

== 1939-1942 ==
On 10 September 1939, Suknik's mother and his younger brother Srul were killed during the German attack on Warsaw. Suknik returned to Warsaw, where the city's Jewish population was forced to live in the Ghetto. During 1941, the remaining members of his immediate family died; his grandfather Josef in June, his older brother Moszek in August and finally his father in November; the latter two dying of Typhus.

In September 1941, Suknik escaped Warsaw to join a Hashomer Hatzair training farm near Częstochowa. In mid-1942, they disbanded and he returned to Warsaw to take an active role in Hashomer Hatzair. joining the Jewish Combat Organisation.

Small arms manufacture and weapon training

When the Jewish Combat Organization - aka Z.O.B - was formed in July 1942, they had no weapons. In August, they received their first shipment of weapons from the Polish side - five pistols and six hand grenades. It did not improve much in the months that followed and more often than not the weapons were in a poor condition and were only partially usable. On his own initiative, Yitzhak founded a workshop in the ghetto to prepare hand grenades and to repair small weapons. By the end of 1942, he became one of the most important producers of weapons, heading two workshops, whose production reached a significant volume of up to 50 grenades a day. He also trained other recruits in the Ghetto in the use of guns, going twice a week to the house of Lotek Rotblat on 44 Muranovska Street to give weapons training.

== The First Armed Resistance - 18 January 1943 ==
At 07.00 AM, Nazi forces under the command of SS Brigadier General Ferdinand von Sammern-Frankenegg moved into the ghetto to round up 8,000 Jews to be sent to Treblinka, with a further 16,000 Jews to be sent to labour camps around Lublin.

The Z.O.B was able to mobilise five units to the Umschlagplatz. Suknik was in a Hashomer Hatzair unit in the Central Ghetto commanded by Mordechai Anielewicz. They were armed with five revolvers, five grenades, Molotov cocktails, crowbars and clubs.

The fighters joined the line of hundreds of prisoners concentrated on Mila Street. As they reached the corner of Zamenhof and Niska, they attacked, each member of the unit targeting a German soldier. Towards the end, Anielewicz, surrounded by several gendarmes, was saved by Suknik throwing two grenades at the SS officers who were pursuing him, one grenade killing two Germans while the others ran away, allowing Anielewicz to escape.

"The Jewish Fighting Organization led the January self-defense action. Key commanders and fighters there included Mordekhai Anielewicz, Zekariah Artszteyn, Margalit Landau, Benjamin Leibgot, Abraham Feiner and Yitzhak Sukenik."

== The Warsaw Ghetto Uprising – April 1943 ==
The Jewish Combat Organisation - aka Z.O.B - organised into three distinct areas: the Central Ghetto, the Brushmakers Workshop area and the Toebbens-Schultz Workshop area. Suknik fought in a combat unit commanded by Mordechai Growas in the Central Ghetto.

On 21 April, the Z.O.B's HQ at Mila 29 caught fire and had to be evacuated. Anielewicz led a group of around twenty fighters towards Nalewki street but decided to spend the night at Mila 17, where they were joined by other fighters. Suknik was part of this Z.O.B group at Mila 17. On 22 April, the Germans were positioned in Kupiecka Street, parallel to Mila, when the fighters positioned themselves in a large yard and prepared to ambush the Nazis. Suknik was posted just in front of the gate to the yard and shot two of the Germans dead with one bullet.

== The Warsaw Ghetto Uprising – May 1943 ==
Tuvia Borzykowski describes an ambush of the Nazis that took place on May 1, which unusually took place during the day rather than at night. "When the right moment came we attacked. Yitzhak Suknik (Koza), a member of Hashomer Hatzair, sent a burst of fire at the Germans, felling three of them." This is corroborated in Out of the Flames by Chaim Primer:

Koza, the best shooter in the Organization, came with us and so did five more fighters. Koza was the only one with a rifle. We reached 43 Nalewki St. and positioned ourselves on the top floor of the building, looking over the yard, just across the entrance gate. A group of Nazis entered the building and as the Germans turned to leave the yard, Koza said: "Just look, now they're mine!" He took the rifle, and once they reached the gate, Koza pulled the trigger. One soldier fell, as the other staggered away. We left our position immediately and looked for another hiding spot.

== Escape And Death: 7–8 May 1943 ==
At this point Suknik was now at the new ZOB's HQ at Mila 18 where Mordechai Anielewicz had begun preparation for fighters to attempt escape through the sewers to the so-called Aryan side.

Suknik was part of a group of eleven trying to reach the Aryan side. Another member of the group was Helena Rufeisen-Schüpper. Their guide was supposed to take them to Bielanska St. but the sewer system was a hazardous maze and they ended up at Dluga St instead. As it was on the Aryan side, they decided to leave the sewers. Just before dawn on 8 May, as they were exiting the sewer, they were spotted by Polish police. There was an attempt to bribe the policemen but German troops nearby heard the commotion and came over. Hela Schupper's recounts, "I heard gunshots. Koza, who was probably one of the best shooters in the Z.O.B, ran towards the German to shoot him with his gun. As he was shooting, the others dispersed. I ran as well." Helena evaded capture. Yitzhak Suknik was shot dead.
