= Irena Adamowicz =

Resistance member during World War II (1910–1973)

Irena Adamowicz

Irena Adamowicz (11 May 1910 – 12 August 1973), was a Polish-born scout leader and a resistance member during World War II. She was a courier for the underground Home Army (Armia Krajowa). In 1985, Adamowicz was posthumously bestowed the title of the Righteous Among the Nations by Yad Vashem in Jerusalem for her activities involving providing information to a number of Jewish ghettos in occupied Poland.

== Biography ==
Adamowicz was born in Warsaw, to a Polish noble family and held a degree in social work from the University of Warsaw before World War II. She served as one of the leaders of the Polish Scout movement (Harcerz Polski) coordinating its activities as a Senior Girl Scout. A Polish Roman Catholic, Adamowicz provided counseling and educational services not only for the Catholic Scouts, but also for the Jewish youth movement called Hashomer Hatzair (Ha-Shomer ha-Tsa'ir) in the 1930s, working in close co-operation with Arie Wilner.

Following the German invasion of Poland, Adamowicz became a member of the underground Home Army (Armia Krajowa) as a clandestine courier. She delivered messages and provided aid and moral support for the Jewish ghettos in several distant cities.

In 1985, Adamowicz was posthumously bestowed the title of the Righteous Among the Nations by Yad Vashem in Jerusalem for her heroic stand against the Nazi Holocaust.

== Liaison missions ==
Due to her work for both Polish and Jewish youth before the invasion of Poland, and her close contact with the Jewish Zionist movement, Adamowicz, a devout Christian, was able to come to the aid of Jewish Fighting Organization's efforts to establish a channel of communication between the ghettos of different cities. At a meeting in Warsaw in late 1941 a decision was made to embark on this perilous effort, by the representatives of AK including Irena Adamowicz and Stanislaw Hajduk, and, on the Jewish side, by Mordechaj Anielewicz, Icchak Cukierman, Józef Kapłan and Cywia Lubetkin. Throughout the summer of 1942 Adamowicz went on a daring trip across Poland and Lithuania to establish contact between clandestine organizations in the ghettos of Warsaw, Wilno (now Vilnius), Białystok, Kowno (now Kaunas) and Szawle (Šiauliai). Her visits became a source of both vital information and moral encouragement, such as her inspirational presence in Kovno Ghetto in July 1942. She earned a Jewish nickname "Di chalutzishe shikse", the Pioneering Gentile.

Following the end of World War II, Adamowicz remained in close contact with the survivors of the Holocaust, with whom she had worked in the Jewish underground. Thanks to their efforts, she was named Righteous among the Nations in 1985. Her personal experience became a part of the book by Władysław Bartoszewski and Zofia Lewin entitled Righteous Among Nations; How Poles Helped the Jews, 1939–1945.
