= Rothblatt =

Rottblatt is a German and Yiddish language name. Roth+Blatt literally means "red leaf". The versions of the surname are Rotblatt, Rothblat and Rotblat.

The surname may refer to:

- Julie Rotblatt-Amrany, American sculptor and painter
- Marv Rotblatt, American baseball player
- Martine Rothblatt, American lawyer, author, and entrepreneur
- Joseph Rotblat, Polish-Jewish physicist
- Lejb Rotblat, activist of the Jewish resistance movement in the Warsaw Ghetto
