= Simcha Rotem =

Warsaw Ghetto Uprising veteran

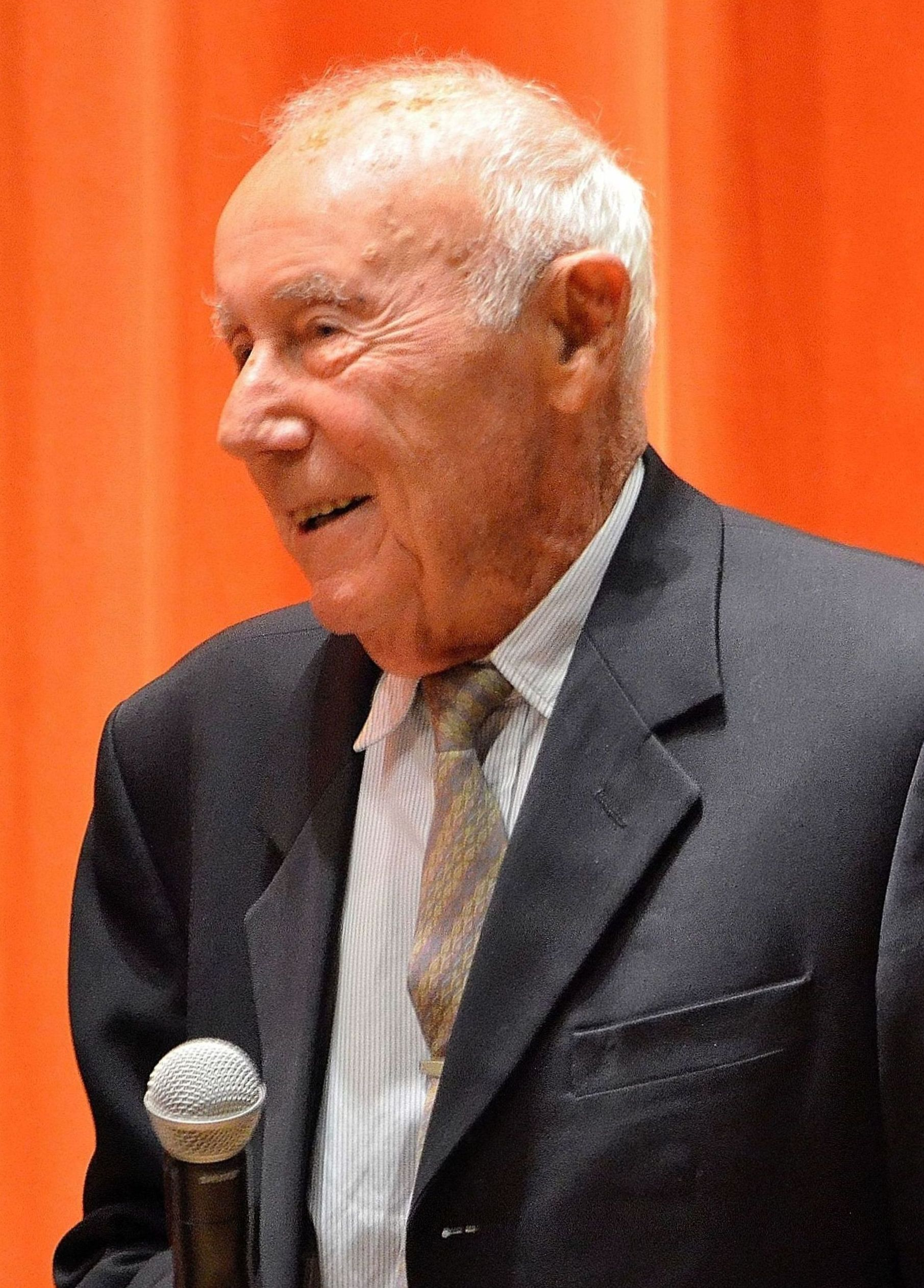
- Rotem in 2013
- Born: Simcha (Szymon) Rathajzer; 24 February 1924; Warsaw, Poland
- Died: 22 December 2018 (aged 94); Jerusalem, Israel
- Known for: Member of the Żydowska Organizacja Bojowa (Jewish Combat Organization), participant in the Warsaw Ghetto Uprising and the Warsaw Uprising

Simcha Rotem (born Simcha (Szymon) Rathajzer, also known by his nom de guerre Kazik; 24 February 1924 – 22 December 2018) was a Polish-Israeli veteran who was a member of the Jewish underground in Warsaw and served as the head courier of the Jewish Fighting Organization (ŻOB), which planned and executed the Warsaw Ghetto Uprising against the Nazis. He was one of the last two surviving Jewish fighters in the Warsaw uprising.

== Early life ==
Rotem was born in 1924 in Warsaw, Poland. He experienced antisemitism early in his life and was a member of the Akiva Zionist youth movement.

== The Second World War ==
As World War II broke out, Rotem was injured in a German bombing campaign which struck his family home. His brother and several members of his family were killed.

=== The Warsaw Ghetto ===
In 1942 he joined the Jewish Fighting Organization (ŻOB). Rotem became particularly useful as a courier for the Warsaw Ghetto fighters. He had the nickname "Kazik"—an abbreviation of a Polish name "Kazimierz" (Casimir), which means in Polish "someone who destroys opponent's prestige/glory during battle".

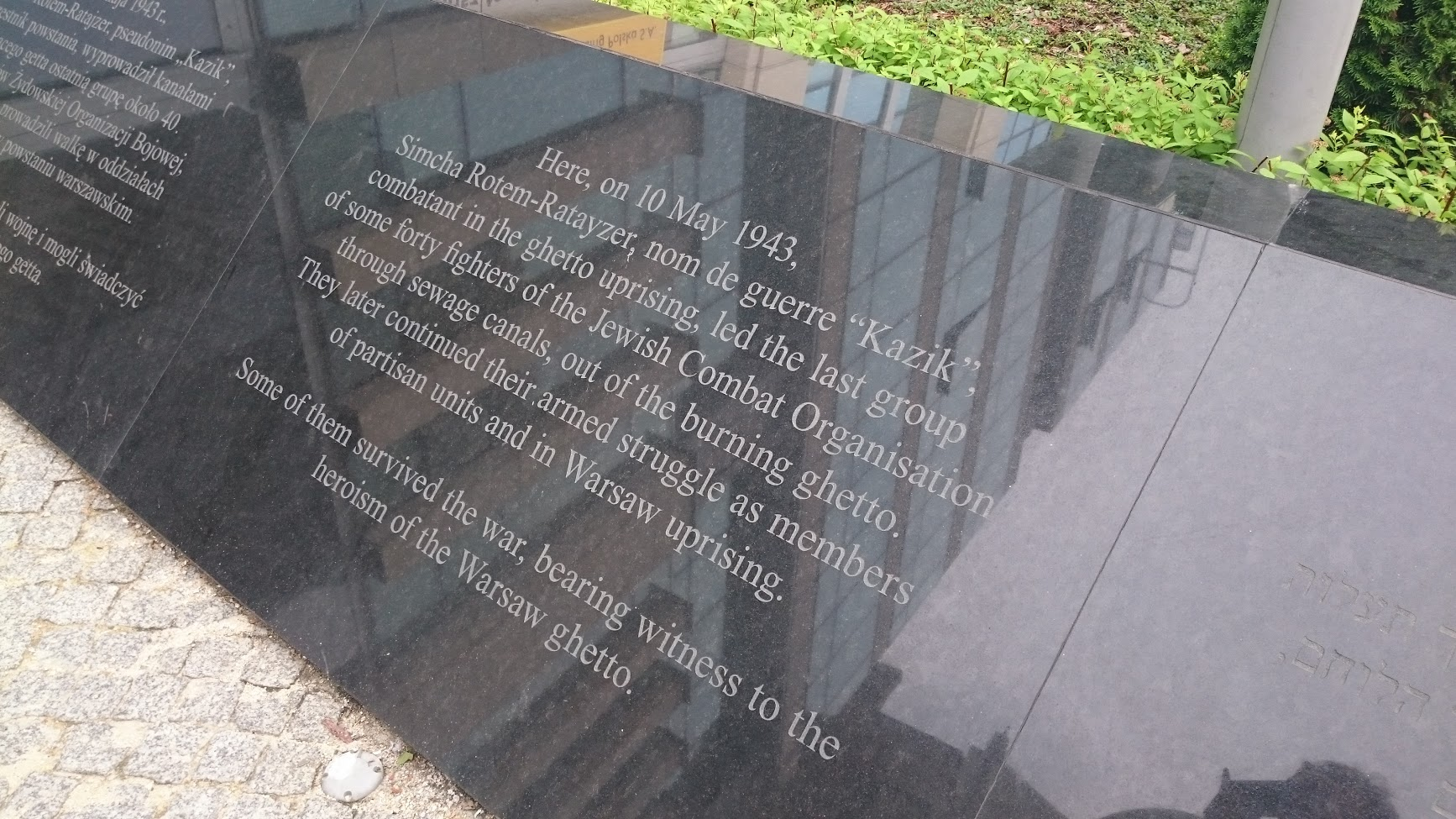
A tribute to Simcha Rotem, Monument to Evacuation of the Warsaw Ghetto Fighters in Warsaw

=== The Warsaw Ghetto Uprising and aftermath ===
As a ŻOB member, Kazik took part in the Warsaw Ghetto Uprising. He became the head courier, reporting directly to the ŻOB commander on the Gentile side, Yitzhak Zuckerman. The ŻOB commander in general was Mordechai Anielewicz. When it became apparent that the Germans would prevail, he was sent via a secret passageway to the Gentile side of Warsaw where he met with Zuckerman to arrange an escape for the fighters. However, the passageway was discovered by the Nazis. Unable to return, he and Zuckerman were trapped on the Gentile side while the fighting raged and the ghetto burned. Desperate to reach his comrades, Rotem made several attempts to enter the ghetto through the sewers before finally succeeding. There he encountered Zivia Lubetkin, one of the last surviving leaders of the ghetto uprising, and he led her with her team of approximately 80 fighters through the sewers to the Gentile side and then to the forests outside of the city. Throughout the rest of the war he continued his underground activities with the resistance, in particular helping to care for the several thousand Jews who still remained in hiding in Warsaw. In August 1944, he took part in the Polish Warsaw Uprising. In July 1945, Simcha Rotem visited the ruins above the Warsaw Miła 18 Command bunker with other survivors of the Jewish Underground.

== Post-war life ==
After the end of World War II, Rotem joined the Nakam group. He infiltrated the bakery of an American camp for German prisoners of war near Dachau in order to poison the German prisoners. After making friends with Poles who worked in the bakery, Rotem got the manager drunk, made copies of the keys, and returned them before he sobered up. The plot was called off soon after in order not to spoil parallel efforts at Langwasser internment camp.

He also took part in the Beriha organization, that helped European Jews immigrate to Mandate Palestine, despite the restrictions imposed by the British Mandatory policies (White Paper of 1939). Although his twelve-year-old sister was murdered in the ghetto uprising, his parents and another sister survived in hiding and, in 1947, he and the surviving members of his family immigrated to Mandate Palestine. He lived in Jerusalem. As of 2018, the year of his death, he was one of two survivors of the Warsaw Ghetto Uprising; At the time of his death, he was credited as being the last surviving fighter of the uprising. However, another fighter, Michael Smuss, in fact outlived him.

In the 2001 TV mini-series Uprising he is portrayed by actor Stephen Moyer.

In April 2018 Rotem castigated Polish president Andrzej Duda, writing: "I became very frustrated, disappointed and even amazed by your systematic disregard of the fundamental difference between the suffering of the Polish nation after Poland was seized by Nazi Germany, which I do not disparage, and the methodical genocide of my brothers and sisters, Poland's Jewish citizens, by the Nazi-German extermination machine, ignoring the fact this extermination machine had many Polish accomplices." Rotem also wrote "I don't blame the Polish nation as a collective, and I'm well aware of the thousands of Poland's Righteous Among the Nations in addition to the many other Poles whose actions to save Jews during the war have not been revealed" and "only once the Polish society truly faces the bitter historical truth, revealing its scope and severity, will there be a chance that those horrors will not be repeated. Therefore, I vehemently oppose the distorted law recently passed in Poland, meant to eradicate from historical recollection the heinous acts the Poles committed against the Jewish people during that dark time."

== Awards and decorations ==
- Grand Cross of the Order of Polonia Restituta (2013)
- Officer's Cross of the Order of Merit of the Republic of Poland (2003)
- Gold Polish Army Medal (2013)

== Bibliography ==
- Rotem, Simhah. Memoirs of a Warsaw Ghetto Fighter: The Past Within Me. New Haven: Yale University Press, 1994 (English translation). 2002 edition: ISBN 978-0-300-09376-6.
