= CCMA =

CCMA may refer to:

- Central Committee of Anti-Fascist Militias, during the Lluís Companys's government of Catalonia, in the Spanish Revolution
- Canadian Country Music Association, the association of the Canadian country music industry
- Catholic Campus Ministry Association
- Closure & Container Manufacturers Association, a trade association of manufacturers who produce closures and containers
- Corporació Catalana de Mitjans Audiovisuals, the public radio and television corporation in Catalonia
- Canadian Cascade Magmatic Arc, a geological formation in southwestern British Columbia, Canada
- Check Point Certified Master Architect, a certification from Check Point
- Commission for Conciliation, Mediation and Arbitration, a South African tribunal
- Casa de Cultura Mordejai Anilevich, a Jewish organization in Uruguay
