= Lejb Rotblat =

Jewish resistance activist

Lejb (Lutek) Rotblat
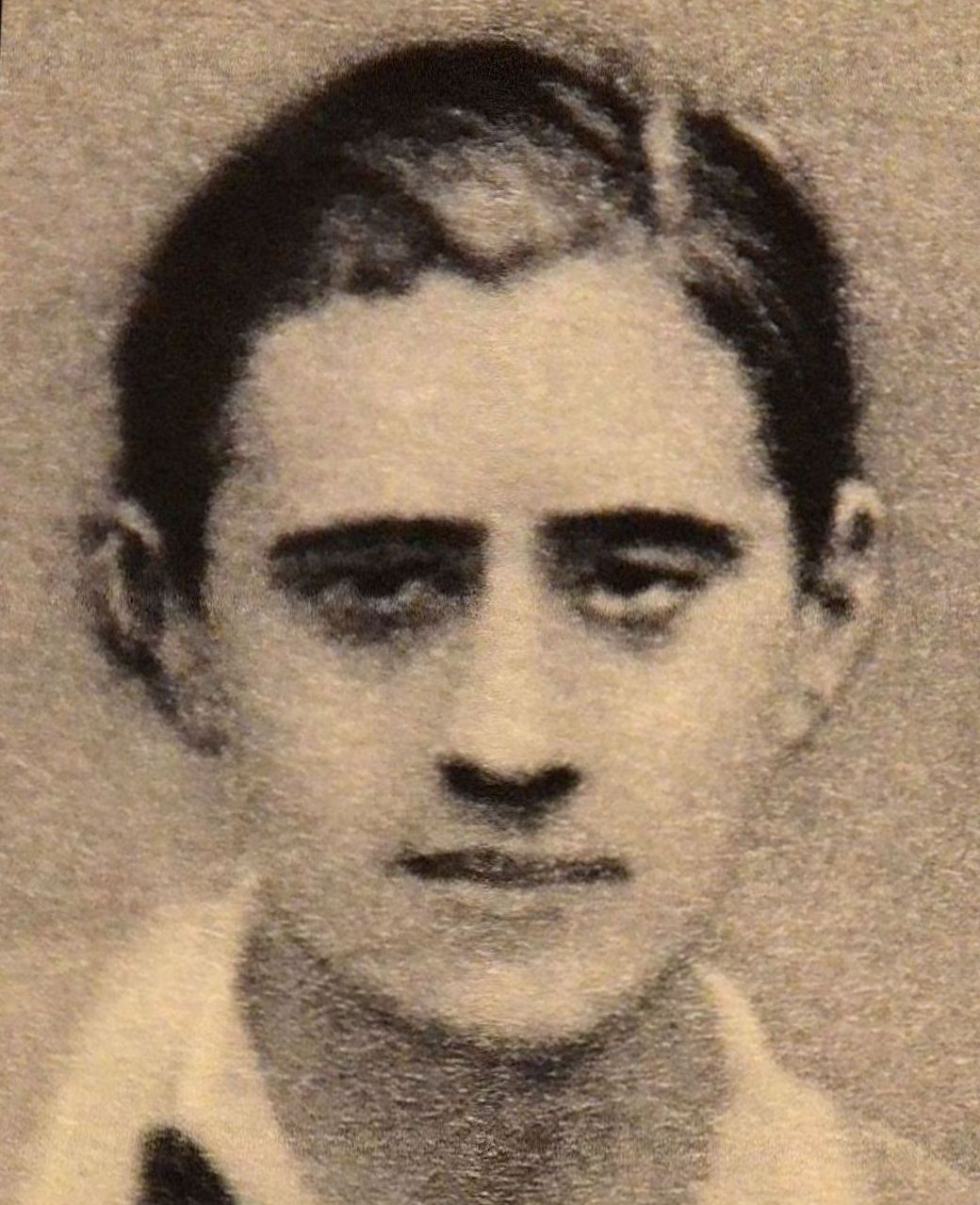
- Born: October 14, 1918; Warsaw, Kingdom of Poland
- Died: May 8, 1943 (aged 24); Anielewicz Bunker, Warsaw Ghetto, German-occupied Poland
- Cause of death: Suicide by gunshot
- Known for: member of the Jewish Combat Organization (ŻOB), fighter in the Warsaw Ghetto Uprising

Lejb (Lutek) Rotblat (October 14, 1918 – May 8, 1943) was an activist of the Jewish resistance movement in the Warsaw Ghetto, a member of Jewish Combat Organisation (ŻOB), and a participant in the Warsaw Ghetto Uprising.

Rotblat came from an assimilated Jewish family. He lost his father when he was little. After graduation from high school in 1937, he became a counsellor at the HaNoar HaTzioni youth organisation. During World War II he joined the Zionist Bnei Akiva youth movement. He lived with his mother Maria (Miriam) Rotblat at 44 Muranowska Street in Warsaw. In March 1943, Arie Wilner found refuge in their apartment. When the deportation to Treblinka extermination camp took place in the summer of 1942, Rotblat and his mother, director of an orphanage at 18 Mylna Street, hid a group of Jewish children in one of the houses in the ghetto.

On February 22, 1943, he participated in the execution of a Gestapo agent, Alfred Nossig.

Between January and April 1943, he took part in collecting weapons for ŻOB. He was also engaged in the production of weapons in the ghetto (hand grenades, petrol bombs). On the eve of the Warsaw Ghetto Uprising in April 1943, he was appointed a commander of his group of Bnei Akiva members, and they fought in the so-called central ghetto area.

On May 8, 1943, he was with his mother in the bunker at 18 Mila Street when it was discovered by the Germans. The fighters did not want to surrender; and at command of Arie Wilner, most of fighters committed suicide. Rotblat shot his mother first, at her own request, then killed himself.

Rotblat is buried in a mass grave along with other deceased ŻOB fighters in the place where they perished, as no exhumation was ever conducted.

== Memorial ==
The name of Lutek Rotblat is engraved on the obelisk, set at the steps of the memorial known as Anielewicz Mound in 2006. It is among 51 names of fighters whose identities were established by historians.

== Sources ==
- Grupińska, Anka (2003). Odczytanie Listy. Kraków: Wydawnictwo Literackie. p. 114. ISBN 83-08-03314-8.
- Lubetkin, Cywia (1999). Zagłada i powstanie. Warszawa: Wydawnictwo "Książka i Wiedza". p. 193. ISBN 83-05-13041-X.
