= Casa de Cultura Mordejai Anilevich =

Jewish organization based in Montevideo, Uruguay

The Casa de Cultura Mordejai Anilevich (acronym CCMA; English: Mordechai Anielevicz Culture House) is a Jewish organization with Humanistic educational character, located in Montevideo, Uruguay.

Established in 1945, it bears the name of Mordechai Anielewicz (1919–1943), a Polish-Jewish leader of the resistance movement against Nazi occupation in Poland.

It seeks to interwine Jewish and Uruguayan cultures, developing cultural, educational and social activities such as workshops and meetings. It promotes reflection and discussion on topics such as human rights, memory, diversity, social justice, environmental ecological awareness, Judaism, Israeli politics, among others, thus encouraging reflection, coexistence, solidarity and social and cultural integration.

CCMA has also a women's section.
