= Mordechai Anielewicz =

Leader of the anti-Nazi Jewish Combat Organization

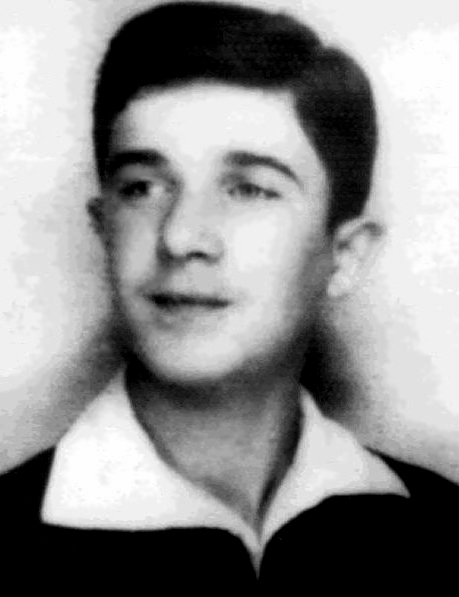
- Born: 1919; Wyszków, Second Polish Republic
- Died: 8 May 1943 (aged 23–24); Warsaw, German-occupied Poland
- Military career
- Allegiance: ŻOB
- Rank: Commander
- Nickname: "Little Angel" (Aniołek)
- Unit: ŻOB main unit
- Conflicts: World War II: Warsaw Ghetto Uprising †
- Awards: Cross of Valor (Poland); Cross of Grunwald, 3rd class; Grand Cross of the Order of Polonia Restituta (all posthumous)

Mordechai Anielewicz (Hebrew: מרדכי אנילביץ'; 1919 – 8 May 1943) was the Polish leader of the Jewish Combat Organization (Polish: Żydowska Organizacja Bojowa, ŻOB) during the Warsaw Ghetto Uprising; the largest Jewish resistance movement during the Second World War. Anielewicz inspired further rebellions in both ghettos and extermination camps with his leadership. His character was engraved as a symbol of courage and sacrifice, and was a major figure of Jewish resistance during the Holocaust.

== Biography ==
Mordechai (Polish: Mordechaj) Anielewicz was born to a Polish-Jewish family of Abraham (Avraham) and Cyryl (Cirel) née Zaltman, in the town of Wyszków near Warsaw where they met during the reconstitution of sovereign Poland. Shortly after Mordechai's birth, his family moved to Warsaw. Mordechai had a brother and two sisters: Pinchas, Hava and Frida. He finished Tarbut elementary with Hebrew instructions in 1933, at the age of 14. Mordechai was a member of the Betar youth movement from 1933 until 1935. He completed the private Jewish Laor Gimnazjum (also La Or, approved by the Ministry of Education). He later switched over to the left-leaning Hashomer Hatzair. At the age of 18 he went to a pre-military Polish training camp.

=== Fleeing Occupied Poland ===
On 7 September 1939, a week after the German invasion of Poland, Anielewicz traveled with a group from Warsaw to the east of the country in the hopes that the Polish Army would slow down the German advance. When the Soviet Red Army invaded and then occupied Eastern Poland in accordance with the Molotov–Ribbentrop Pact, Anielewicz heard that Jewish refugees, other youth movement members and political groups had flocked to Wilno, which was then under Soviet control.

Anielewicz travelled to Wilno and attempted to convince his colleagues to send people back to other Polish occupied territories to continue the fight against the Germans. He then attempted to cross the Romanian border to open a route for young Jews to get to the Mandate of Palestine, but was caught and thrown into the Soviet jail. He was released a short time later and returned to Warsaw in January 1940 with his girlfriend, Mira Fuchrer. While there Anielewicz saw his father for the last time, who was pressed into forced labor.

==== Initial resistance ====
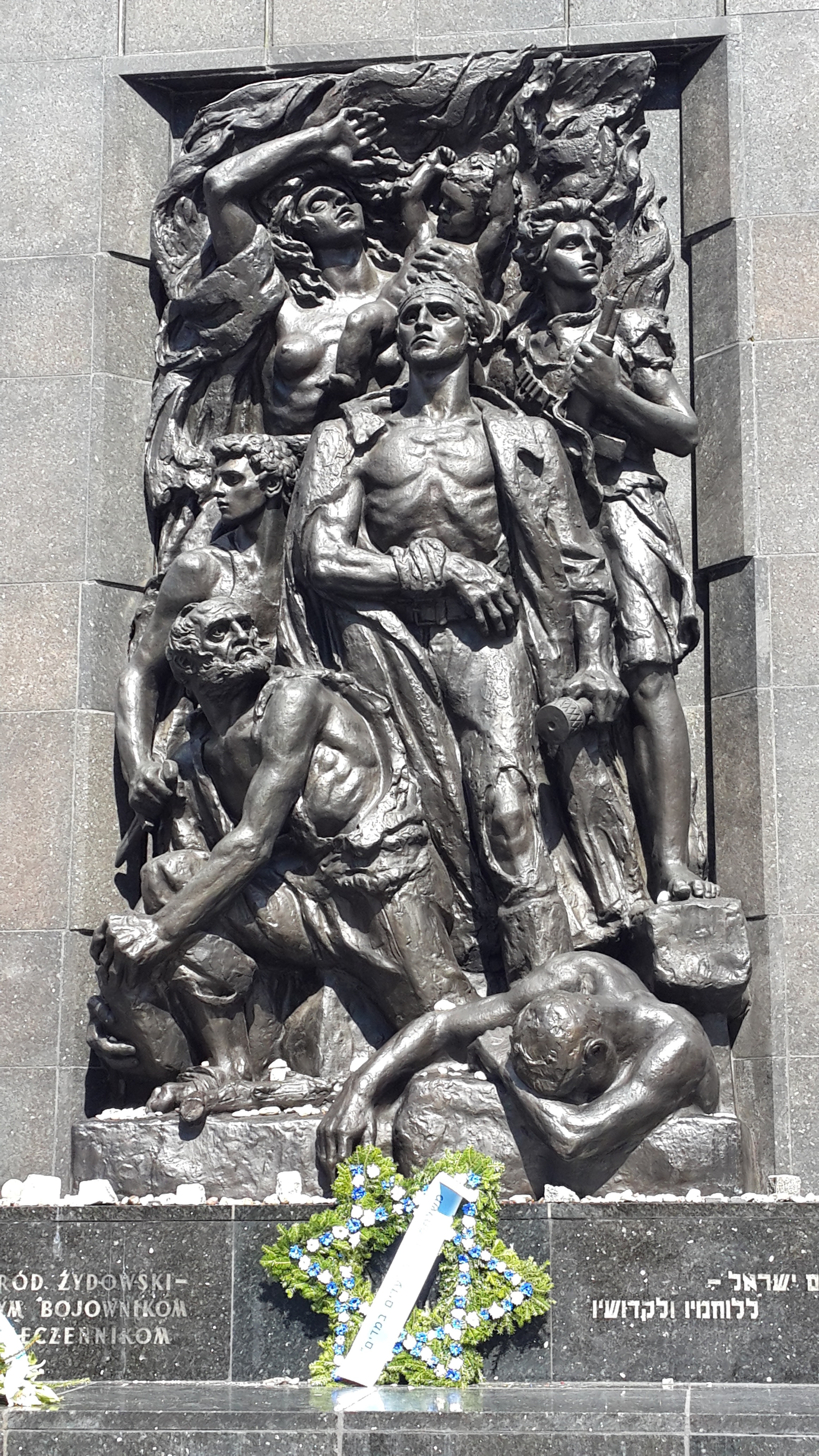
Monument to the Ghetto Heroes (Aniołek is in the center, wielding a hand grenade)

After returning to Warsaw, Anielewicz organized groups, meetings, seminars, secretly attended resistance groups in other cities, and founded the underground newspaper Neged ha-zerem (Hebrew: נגד הזרם, literally "Counter-current"). At the beginning of April 1940, the construction of the Warsaw Ghetto began. It stretched over an area of 3.4 km^{2}, and gradually a 3 m high wall with barbed wire was built around it. In mid-October, it was officially established, and by mid-November, the Germans had driven the Jews from the rest of Warsaw and its surroundings. An estimated 400,000 Jews, representing about 30% of the city's population, were pushed into an area which took up approximately 2.4% of the city's area. On top of extreme overcrowding, inadequate food supply and disease caused tens of thousands of deaths before deportation even began. In October 1941, the German occupation administration in Poland issued a decree that every Jew, captured outside the ghetto without a valid permit, would be executed.

After the first reports of the mass murder of the Jews spread at the end of 1941, Anielewicz began immediately to organize defensive Jewish groups in the Warsaw Ghetto. His first attempt to join the Polish resistance, subject to the Polish exile government in London, ended in failure. In March 1942, Anielewicz was among the founders of the anti-fascist group. Even it did not have a long duration and eventually, it was dissolved.

In the summer of 1942, he visited the southwest region of Poland – annexed to Germany – attempting to organize armed resistance. At the same time, German authorities launched an operation which aimed at the liquidation of Jews from the Warsaw Ghetto into extermination camps. It was announced that 6,000 Jews were to be dispatched each day, irrespective of gender or age, to leave for labor camps to the east in the resettlement program. The first one set off on 22 July 1942, the eve of the Jewish holiday of Tisha B'Av, which is the saddest day of Jewish history. By 12 September 1942, German authorities from the Warsaw Ghetto had deported 300,000 Jews. A total of 265,000 of them went to Treblinka where they were murdered. More than 10,000 Jews were murdered by the Germans during deportations and 11,850 Jews were sent by authorities to forced labor camps. After the first wave of deportations in mid-September 1942, roughly 55 to 60 thousand Jews remained in the ghetto.

==== Warsaw Ghetto Uprising ====
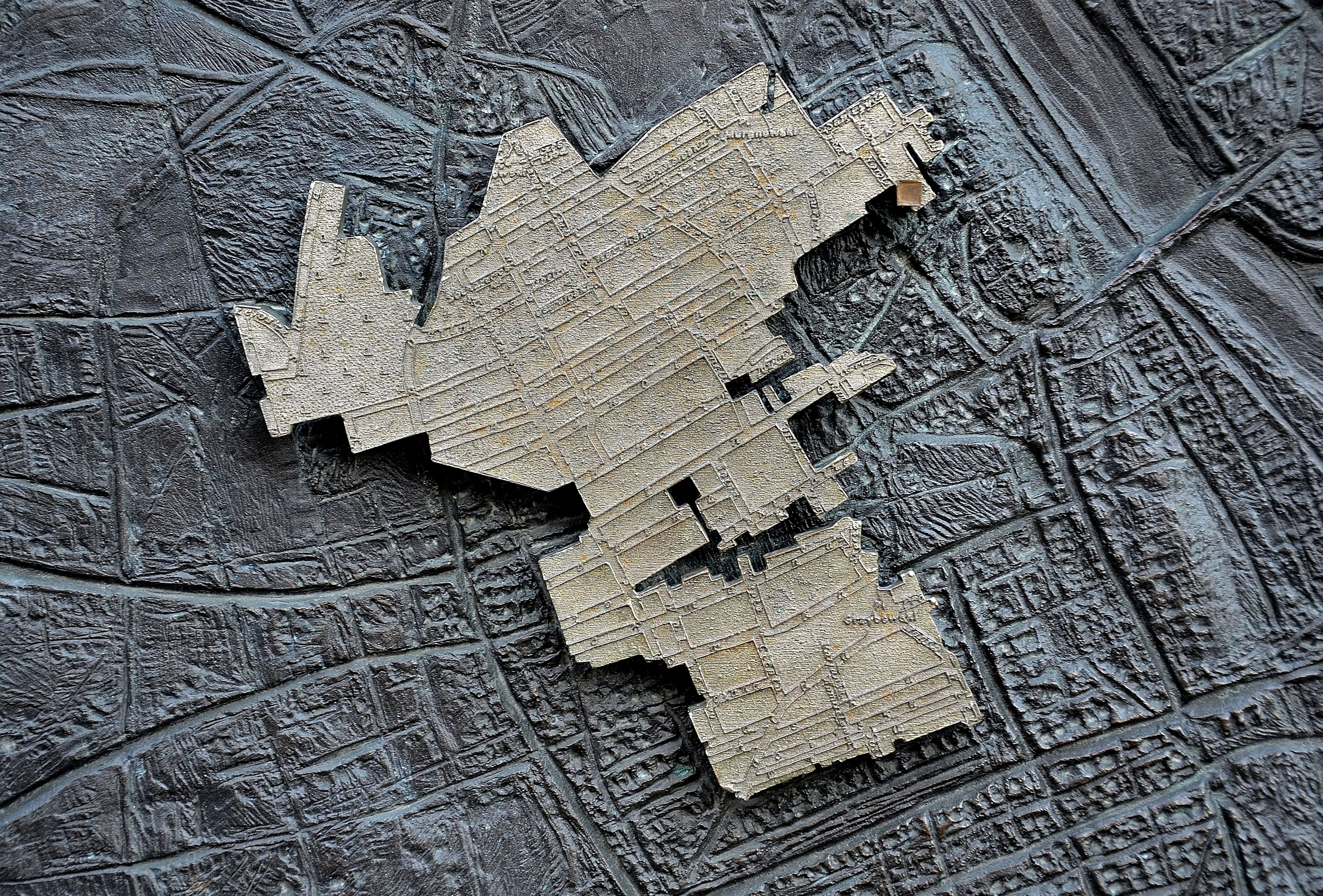
Warsaw Ghetto boundary marker in Świętojerska Street in Warsaw

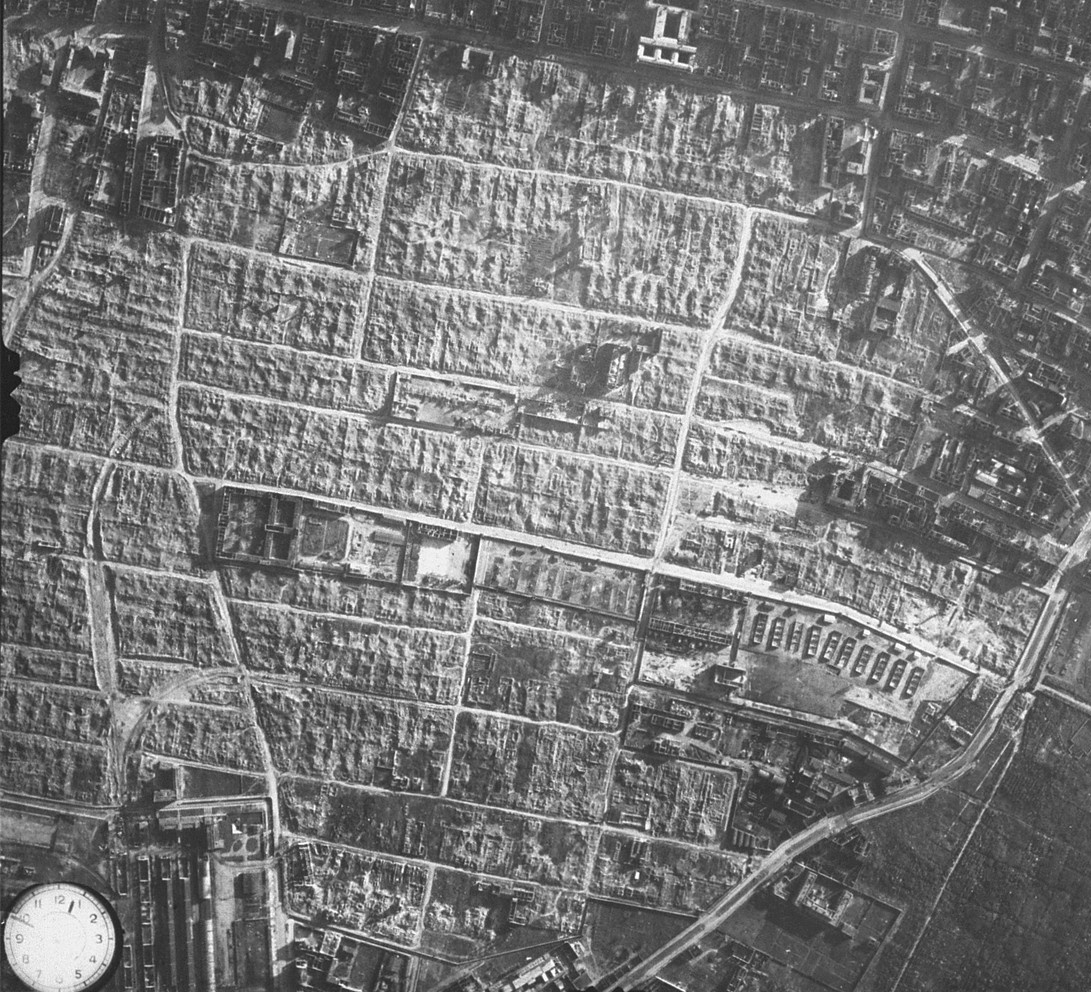
1944 Aerial photograph of the destroyed Warsaw Ghetto

In October 1942, the Jewish resistance managed to establish contact with the Polish Home Army, which was able to smuggle a small number of weapons and explosives into the ghetto. Since the end of September 1942, the Jews started building fortified bunkers and shelters in the Warsaw Ghetto, and there were 600 by January 1943. Each fighter had a gun and several hand grenades (many of them home-made) or Molotov cocktails. There was however a lack of ammunition and heavier weapons – only a few rifles, ground mines, and one machine gun were available.

On 18 January 1943, the Germans resumed deportation. Anielewicz, together with other members of ŻOB and ŻZW, decided to act. They were armed with five revolvers, five grenades, Molotov cocktails, crowbars and clubs. Twelve of them joined a group of evacuated Jews and attacked the German soldiers on the contracted signal. The fighters joined the line of hundreds of prisoners concentrated on Mila Street. As they reached the corner of Zamenhof and Niska, they attacked, each member of the unit targeting a German soldier. In the subsequent confusion, part of the deported Jews managed to escape. Most of the resistance in the attack died. Towards the end Anielewicz, surrounded by several gendarmes, was saved by Yitzhak Suknik throwing two grenades at the SS officers who were pursuing him, one grenade killing two Germans whilst the others ran away, allowing Anielewicz to escape. This first case of armed resistance was of great importance. Among other things, it led to the greater willingness of the Polish underground to provide weapons to the Jewish resistance. Not all weapons, however, came from underground groups. Some of them ŻOB bought from arms dealers. The beginning of the revolt was a prelude to the Warsaw Ghetto Uprising that began on 19 April. During these three months, Anielewicz's leadership underwent intensive preparations for the further clashes with the Germans. He decided to use the guerrilla way of fighting with a vast network of tunnels, bunkers, roofs and surprise moments. He believed that enough Jews could withstand the ghetto for months. A day after the Germans suspended deportations, he wrote an open letter to the people of the ghetto under the name of the Jewish Battle Organization:

To the Jewish Masses in the Ghetto

On January 22, 1943, six months will have passed since the deportations from Warsaw began. We all remember well the days of terror during which 300,000 of our brothers and sisters were cruelly put to death in the death camp of Treblinka. Six months have passed of life in constant fear of death, not knowing what the next day may bring. We have received information from all sides about the destruction of the Jews in the Government-General, in Germany, in the occupied territories. When we listen to this bitter news we wait for our own hour to come, every day and every moment. Today we must understand that the Nazi murderers have let us live only because they want to make use of our capacity to work to our last drop of blood and sweat, to our last breath. We are slaves, and when slaves are no longer profitable, they are killed. Everyone among us must understand that, and everyone among us must remember it always.

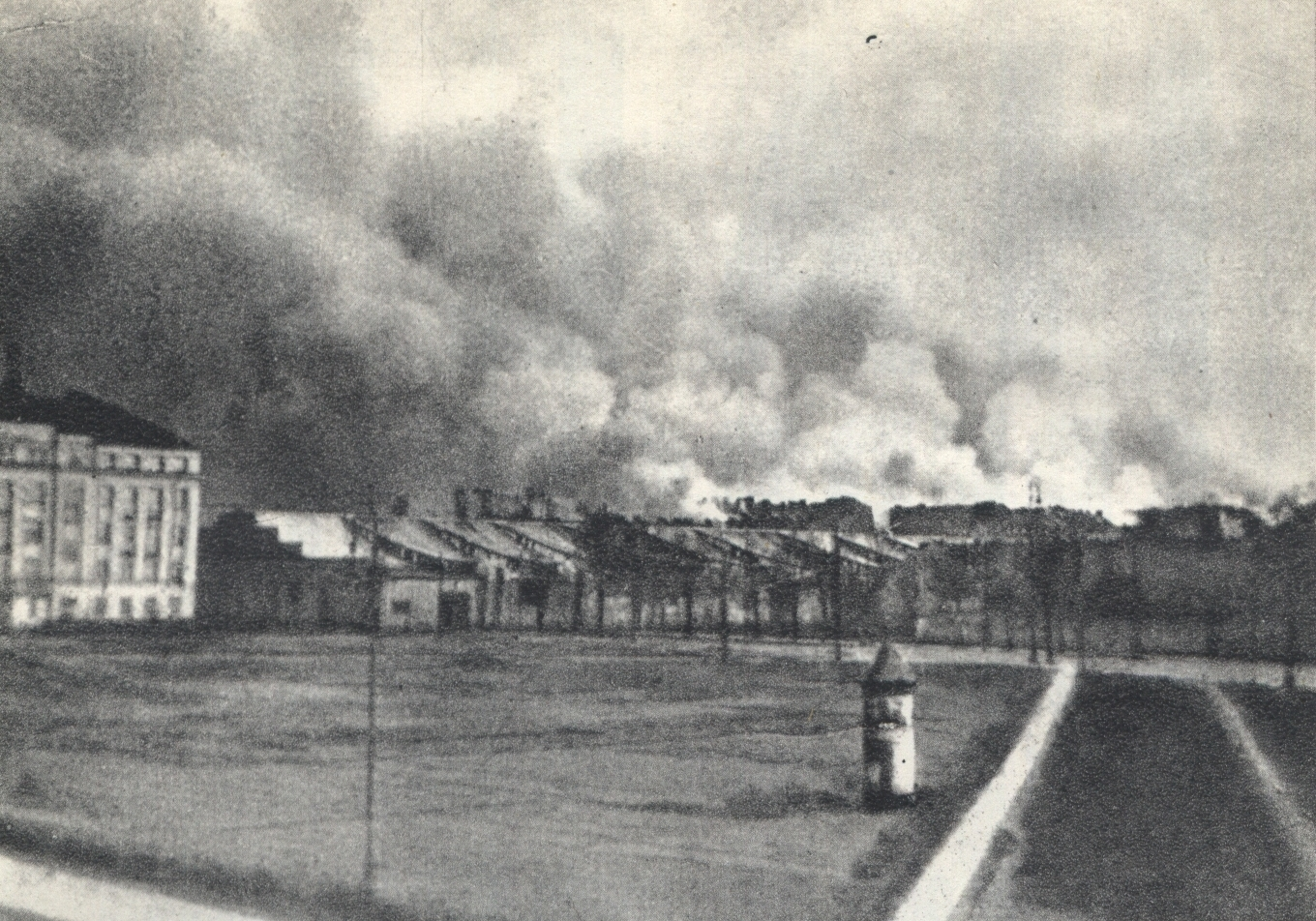
Warsaw Ghetto in flames. Photo taken in the end of April 1943 from an overpass which connect Żoliborz district with Warsaw's downtown

The final destruction of the ghetto and deportation of the remaining Jews began on 19 April, at 6 am, the day before Adolf Hitler's birthday and Passover. SS functionary Ferdinand von Sammern-Frankenegg sent 850 soldiers (German and Ukrainian) to Warsaw with sixteen officers who accompanied a light tank and two armored cars. Members of Jewish resistance groups attacked groups of German soldiers with pistols, grenades, and Molotov cocktails from roofs, balconies, windows, doors and adjoining courtyards. Although the Germans had military superiority, they were not prepared whatsoever for the guerrilla way of fighting they had encountered. On the contrary, Jews had a perfect knowledge of the environment, relied on a number of hiding places, and were difficult to target because of the interconnection of individual houses. After two hours of intense fighting, the Germans withdrew.

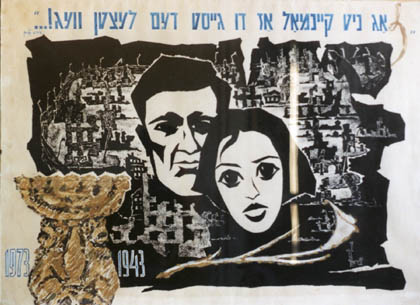
Anielewicz and girlfriend Mira Fuchrer in the destroyed Warsaw Ghetto (a painting by Shimon Garmize)

At 11:00 the next morning, soldiers under the command of SS General Jürgen Stroop entered the ghetto, where again they encountered hard resistance from approximately 750 Jewish defenders. Stroop set up artillery and sent soldiers to look for the hiding Jews. In the afternoon of the same day, there was a symbolic event where two Jewish boys climbed to the roof of one of the houses where they put Polish and Jewish flags. Both of them were in the eye of not only to Stroop, but also Himmler. On the evening of the first day, Stroop withdrew his men.

During the following days, the Germans broke the tough resistance with the use of artillery and flame throwers. The smoke and heat from the fire forced a number of Jews to leave their shelters, and some chose to commit suicide by jumping from the windows of burning houses, or they escaped through the sewage lines that were still connected to the Gentile part of the city after the construction of the ghetto. On the third day of the collision, Stroop changed tactics and tried to avoid direct confrontation to reduce the number of German losses. After over four days of fighting, the Jewish headquarters in Muranów fell. Most of the defenders were dead or wounded, and many escaped outside the ghetto.

On 23 April, a bunker was built under the house on Miła Street. Until 25 April, the Germans captured 25,500 Jews. At the end of the month, many bunkers and hiding places were exposed and most homes were burned to the ground. On 7 May, a group led by Zivia Lubetkin set out from the Command Bunkhouse under the Miła Street through a complex sewer system to find an escape route from the ghetto. The same day, however, the bunker was discovered by the Germans – at that time, there were two hundred people, including Anielewicz and his girlfriend. On 7 May Stroop reported the discovery of the bunker of inner 'party leadership' to Krüger, and the following day, he reported to the high command that Nazi forces had breached the bunker and the "deputy head of the Jewish military organization ZWZ" (presumably Anielewicz) had successfully been "captured and liquidated". With no surviving eyewitnesses to confirm Stroop's claims, the fate of Anielewicz is unknown; it is assumed that he died on 8 May 1943, alongside his girlfriend and advisors, at the surrounded ŻOB command post at 18 Miła Street. His body was never found and it is believed that it was buried in the ruins of the bunker (covered by the debris of Mila Street) – a site memorialized today as a gravesite – or carried off to nearby crematoria among the dead. The Germans had fired into the fortified headquarters with gas hoses to expel the hiding Jewish fighters to the surface. Countless had fought to their last breaths amid pure chaos, many succumbing to poison gas or taking their own lives to avoid capture. From the bunker, only a handful of them managed to penetrate the sewer network.

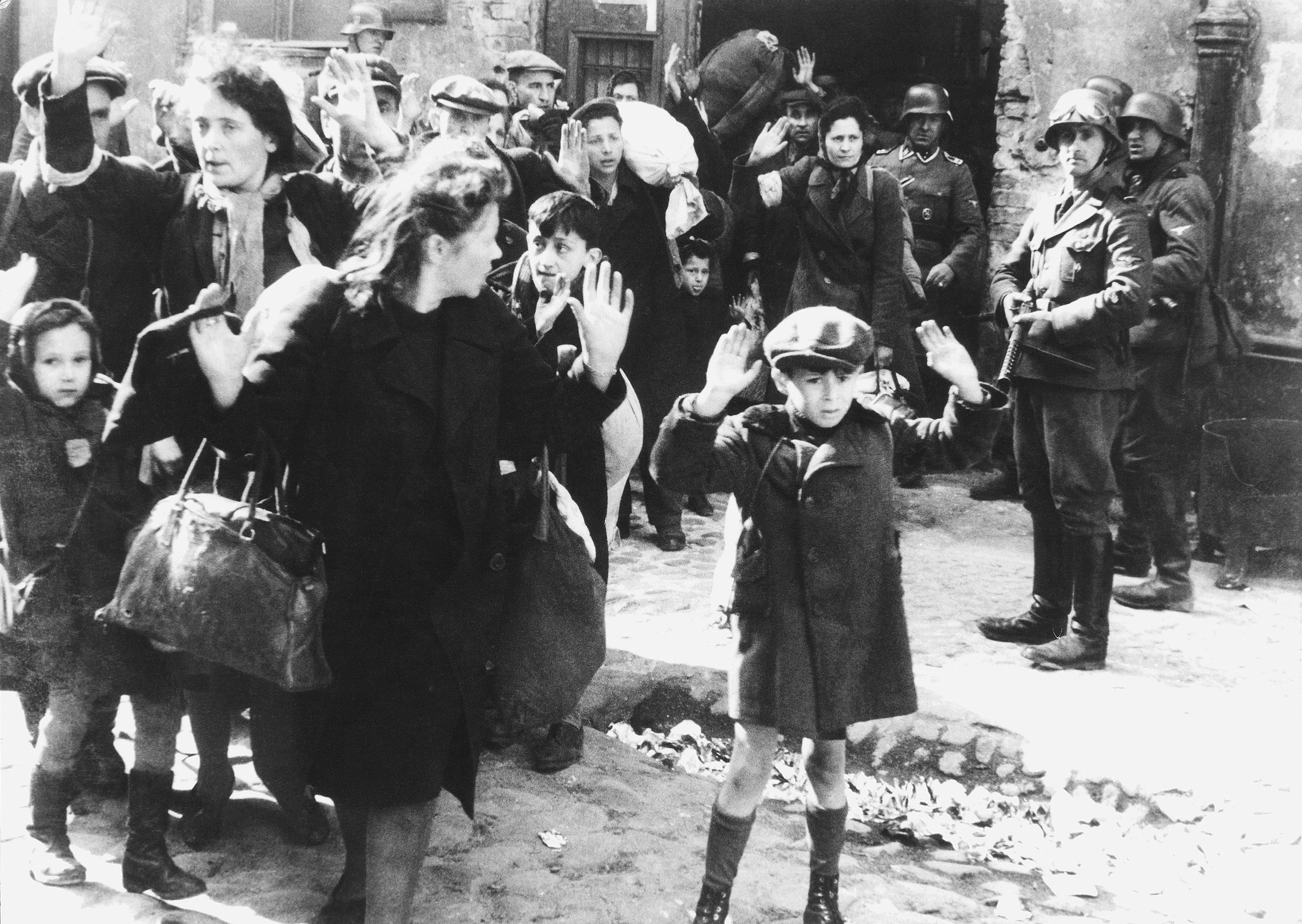
Jews from the ghetto captured after the rebellion was suppressed

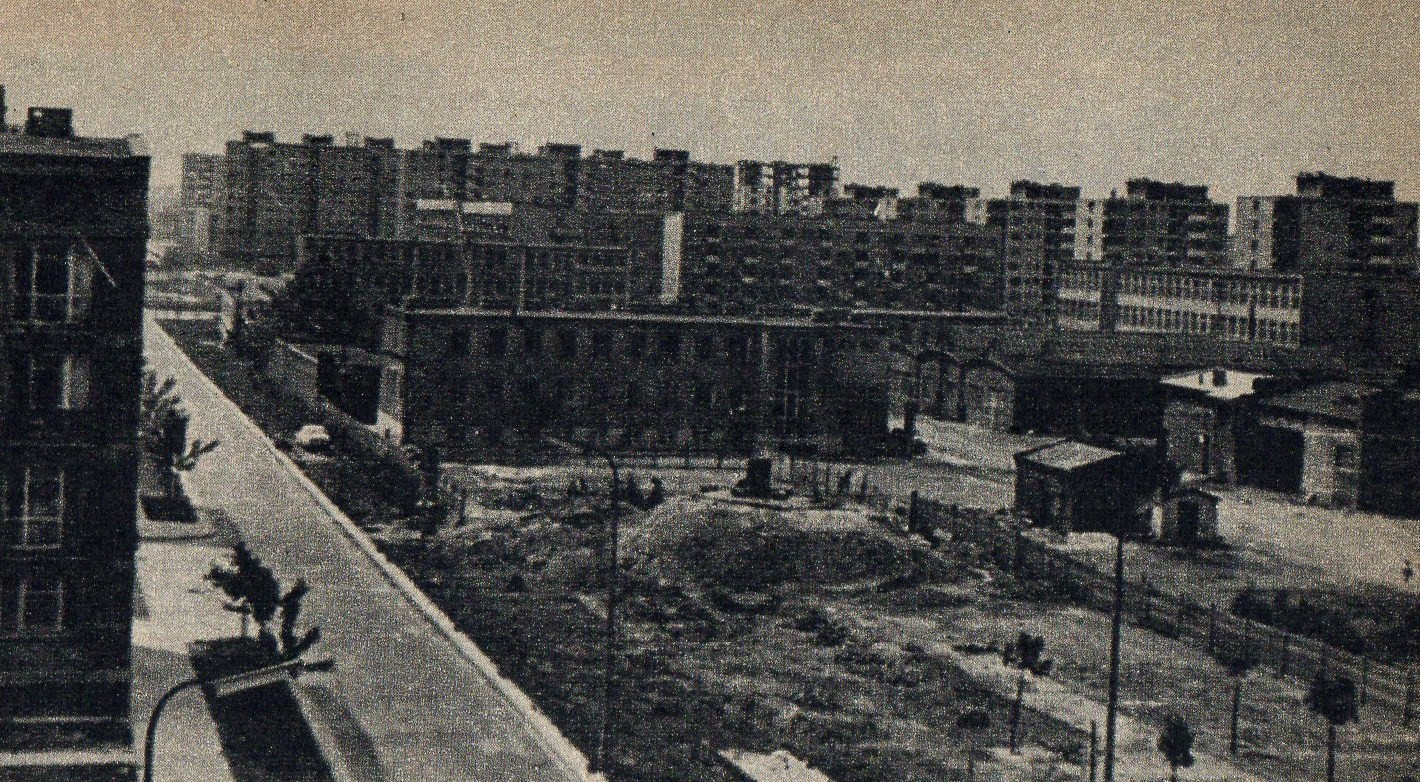
Site of Mila 18 in 1964

Several days before the final suppression of the rebellion and shortly after the destruction of the Command Bunker, a rescue operation was carried out, during which about eighty Jewish fighters were transferred to a so-called Aryan section of the city and taken to safety. The event was organized by Yitzhak Zuckerman and Simcha Rotem. Although the Germans planned to destroy the ghetto within three days, the struggles lasted for four weeks and they didn't suppress them definitively until 16 May 1943, when Operation Commander Jürgen Stroop symbolically ended the explosion of the Great Synagogue in Warsaw. Yet, after many months, the remaining surviving Jews were attacking German patrols. Most of those who managed to escape from the ghetto became guerrillas but were often shot or committed suicide to avoid capture. Many of them later fought alongside the Poles during the Warsaw Uprising in 1944. According to an official German report, written by Stroop, the German army captured 57,065 Jews and destroyed 631 bunkers. He estimated that 7,000 Jews died during the rebellion, and another 7,000 German authorities deported to Treblinka. The remaining Jews, around 42,000, were deported to Majdanek, Poniatowa, Trawniki, Budzyń, and Kraśnik camps. With the exception of several thousand prisoners in the Budzyń and Krasnik camps, the remaining Warsaw Jews from other camps were murdered in November 1943, during Aktion Erntefest.

== Commemoration ==
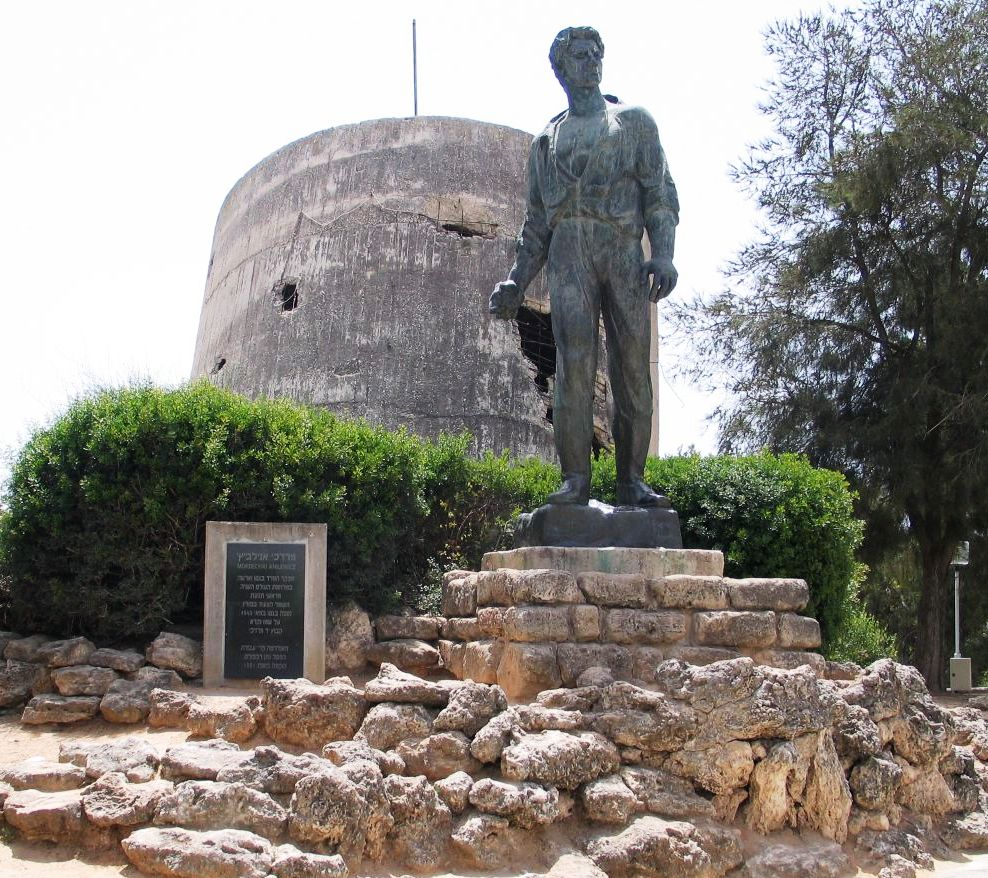
Anielewicz memorial at Yad Mordechai

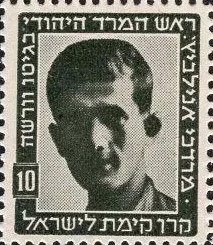
Postage stamp honoring Anielewicz by the Jewish National Fund (1946)

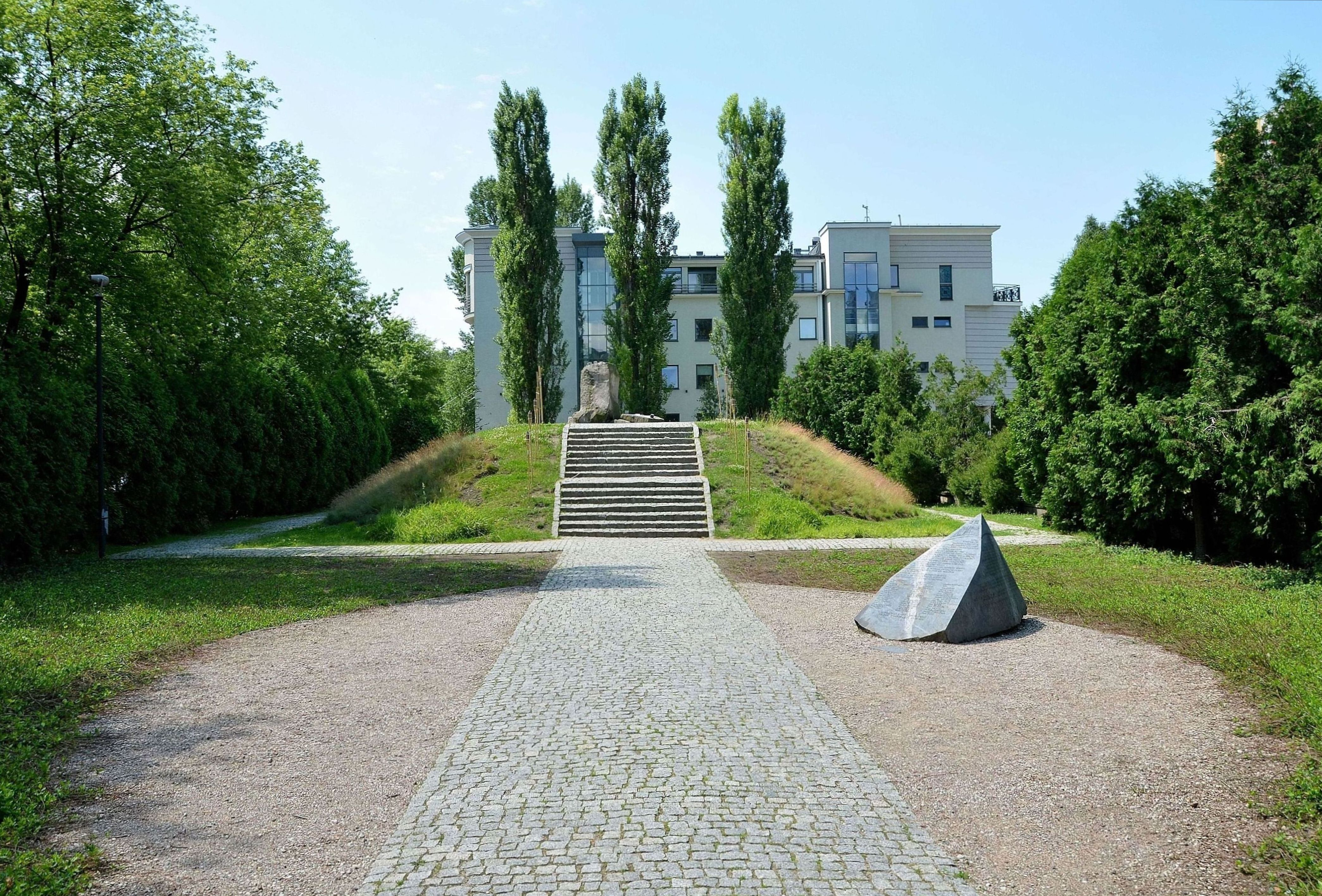
General view of Miła 18 memorial, place of death of Mordechai Anielewicz

- During the later part of the war, a unit of the People's Guard formed by Warsaw Ghetto survivors bore the name of Anielewicz
- In July 1944, Anielewicz was posthumously awarded the Cross of Valour by the Polish government in exile.
- In 1945 he was also awarded the Cross of Grunwald, 3rd Class by the Polish People's Army.
- In December 1943, kibbutz Yad Mordechai in Israel was renamed after him and had a monument erected in his memory.
- In 1945 was established the Casa de Cultura Mordejai Anilevich in Montevideo, Uruguay.
- The site of a former German concentration camp, was renamed Mordechaj Anielewicz Street.
- Many cities in Israel have streets named after him, including Beersheba, Tel Aviv, Petah Tikva, Safed, Lod, Ashdod, Haifa, Holon, Yehud and more.
- In 1983, the Israeli government issued a two-stamp set honoring Anielewicz and Josef Glazman as heroes of the ghettos.
- In 2023, he was commemorated in the Holocaust memorial at Rio de Janeiro, Brazil. On the same year, he was posthumously awarded the Grand Cross of the Order of Polonia Restituta by the President of Poland Andrzej Duda.

== Bibliography ==
- Edelman, Marek, and Krall, Hanna. Shielding the Flame: An Intimate Conversation With Dr. Marek Edelman, the Last Surviving Leader of the Warsaw Ghetto Uprising. Henry Holt and Company, New York, 1986
- Zuckerman, Yitzhak, A Surplus of Memory: Chronicle of the Warsaw Ghetto Uprising (A Centennial Book), ISBN 0-520-07841-1
