= Izrael Chaim Wilner =

Polish-Jewish resistance fighter during World War II

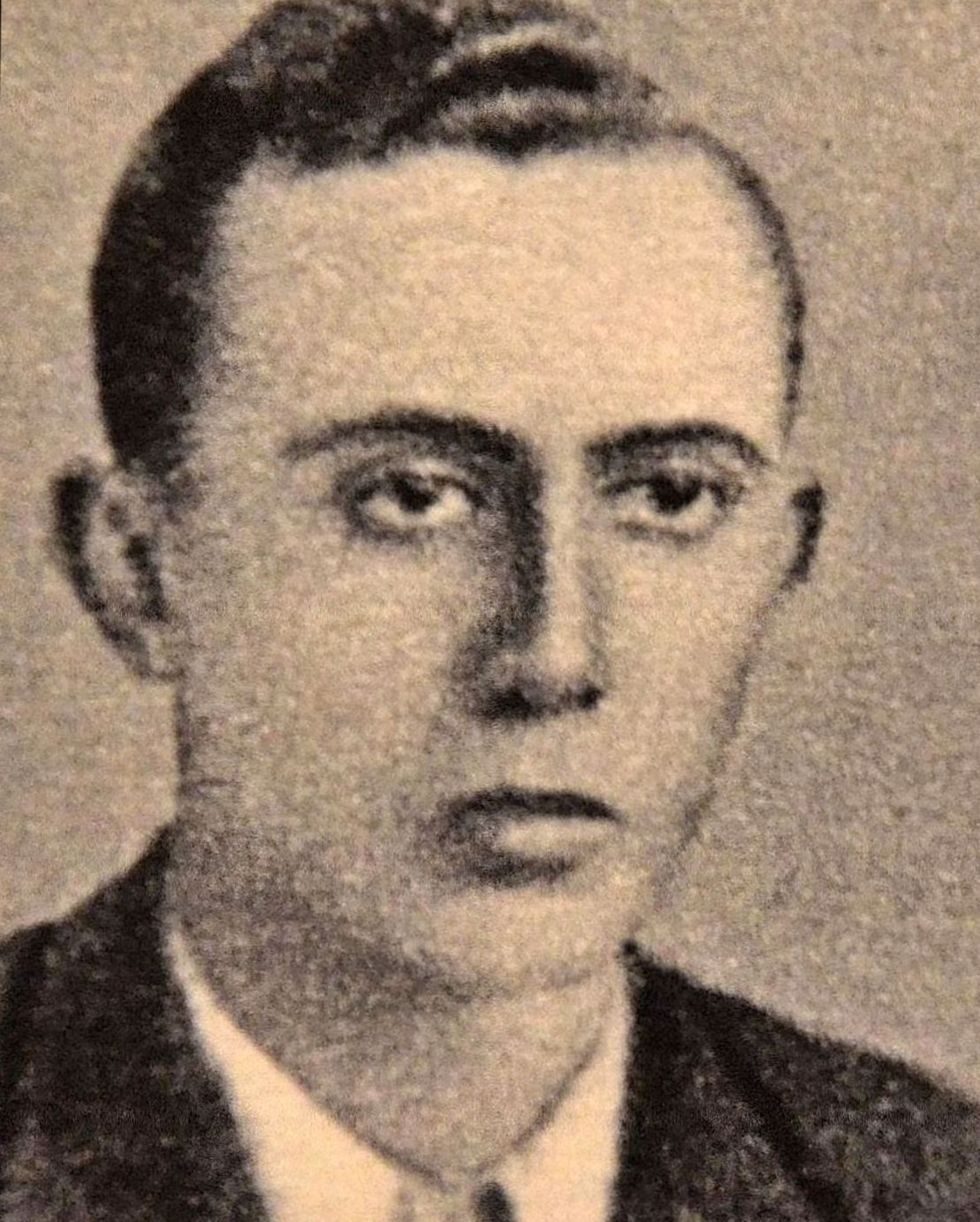
- Born: November 14, 1917; Warsaw, Congress Poland, Russian Empire
- Died: May 8, 1943 (aged 25); Warsaw, General Government

Izrael Chaim Wilner, nom de guerre "Arie" and "Jurek" (November 14, 1917 – May 8, 1943) was a Jewish resistance fighter during World War II, member of the Jewish Fighting Organization's (ŻOB) leadership, a liaison between ŻOB and the Polish Home Army, a poet, and a participant in the Warsaw Ghetto Uprising.

== Early life ==
Wilner came from a well-off family. Before the war he was an active member of the socialist-Zionist movement Hashomer Hatzair.

== During the war ==
After the German invasion of Poland, Wilner, along with several other Jews, hid among the Dominican nuns in Wilno (now Vilnius). There, he met Henryk Grabowski (nom de guerre "Słonina", or "Salo" due to the fact that he ran a meat store), a courier for the Polish Home Army (AK). According to Marek Edelman, Jurek Wilner was the mother superior's favorite because he reminded her of her brother who had been taken by Germans for slave labor. While in hiding, they discussed various issues, including religion and Marxism. It was the mother superior who first called him "Jurek". When he left with Grabowski for Warsaw, Wilner left his most prized possession, a notebook of poems and personal observations with her.

In Warsaw, Jurek Wilner was the ŻOB's representative on the "Aryan side", and the main contact between the organization in the Warsaw Ghetto and the Polish resistance, particularly through Henryk Woliński, "Wacław". Grabowski himself was unaware of Jurek's role due to the conspiratorial need to keep information compartmentalized in case of arrest and interrogation by the Gestapo. He learned of it only after the war.

"Wacław" and the AK supplied Wilner with weapons and ammunition, with Jurek and Tosia Altman serving as contact persons. It was Jurek's job to smuggle these back into the ghetto (with help from Wolinski). On occasions when there was too much material to carry in one trip Jurek would hide the remainder at the Carmelite convent on Wolska Street in Warsaw. Grabowski also acquired 200 grams of cyanide for Wilner which the ŻOB fighters wanted to have in case of being captured by the Germans.

In early March 1943 Wilner was arrested by the Gestapo while carrying false documents and arms. The Gestapo did not realize that he was a Jew and rather considered him to be a ranking member of the Polish resistance. Jewish resistants had an unwritten law that if someone was arrested, he had to keep silent for at least three days. After that if he was broken, nobody would blame him for that. The Germans tortured Jurek Wilner for a month, and he gave not a thing away—no contacts, no addresses, despite his knowledge of them.

He managed to escape at the end of March. He joined a column of prisoners being taken for hard labor to the Grochowo concentration camp, hoping that this way he would die more quickly and thus avoid further interrogation by the Gestapo. However, Grabowski learned from someone that Wilner was in the camp, entered by swimming across the surrounding swamp and personally rescued Jurek.

After he escaped, Jurek returned to the Ghetto. But he was useless. His nails, kidneys, and feet were smashed, he had been tortured daily. He simply could not walk.

Before the outbreak of the uprising in the ghetto, Wilner told Woliński, "We do not wish to save our lives. None of us will come out of this alive. We want to save the honor of mankind".

According to one of the last ZOP reports, it was Jurek who called on the fighters to commit mass suicide on May 8 in the bunker at 18 Mila Street. As the first one, Lutek Rotblat initially shot his mother and then himself. In the bunker most of the members of the Combat Organization found their deaths, including Commander Mordechaj Anielewicz.

The Polish government posthumously awarded him the Virtuti Militari Cross, V class, Poland's highest military decoration for courage in the face of the enemy. In the 2001 television film Uprising, he was portrayed by American actor Eric Lively.

== Poetry ==
Some of Wilner's poems survived the war, as they had been written in the notebook which he had left with the mother superior of the Dominican convent in Wilno. Several of them have been transcribed and published in the book by Hanna Krall, "Shielding the Flame" (Zdążyć przed Panem Bogiem").
