= Biskupice, Częstochowa County =

Biskupice
- Village
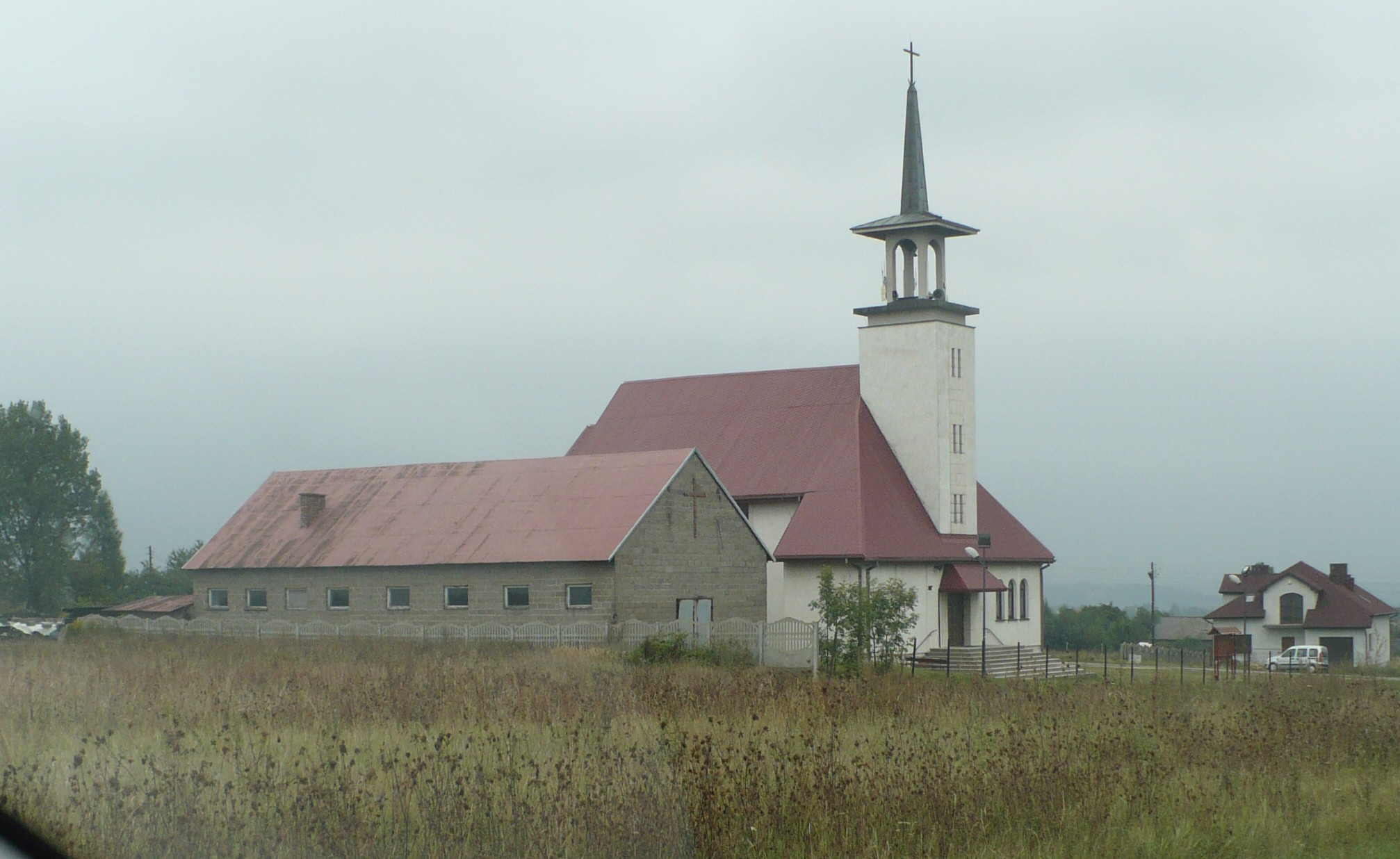
- A church in Biskupice

- Location within Poland
- Coordinates: 50°42′N 19°17′E
- Country: Poland
- Voivodeship: Silesian
- County: Częstochowa
- Gmina: Olsztyn
- Population: 824

Biskupice [biskuˈpit͡sɛ] is a village in the administrative district of Gmina Olsztyn, within Częstochowa County, Silesian Voivodeship, in southern Poland.
