= Krasawa, Silesian Voivodeship =

Krasawa
- Village
- Location within Poland
- Coordinates: 50°42′N 19°20′E
- Country: Poland
- Voivodeship: Silesian
- County: Częstochowa
- Gmina: Olsztyn
- Population: 167

Krasawa [kraˈsava] is a village in the administrative district of Gmina Olsztyn, within Częstochowa County, Silesian Voivodeship, in southern Poland.
