= Gmina Olsztyn =

Gmina Olsztyn Olsztyn Commune
- Gmina
- Flag Coat of arms
- Interactive map of Gmina Olsztyn
- Coordinates (Olsztyn): 50°45′7″N 19°16′4″E
- Country: Poland
- Voivodeship: Silesian
- County: Częstochowa
- Seat: Olsztyn

Area
  - Total: 108.82 km^{2} (42.02 sq mi)

Population (2019-06-30)
  - Total: 7,833
  - Density: 71.98/km^{2} (186.4/sq mi)
- Website: https://www.olsztyn-jurajski.pl/

Gmina Olsztyn is a rural gmina (administrative district) in Częstochowa County, Silesian Voivodeship, in southern Poland. Its seat is the village of Olsztyn, which lies approximately 12 kilometres (7 mi) south-east of Częstochowa and 59 km (37 mi) north of the regional capital Katowice.

The gmina covers an area of 108.82 square kilometres (42.0 sq mi), and as of 2019 its total population is 7,833.

The gmina contains part of the protected area called Eagle Nests Landscape Park.

== Villages ==
Gmina Olsztyn contains the villages and settlements of Biskupice, Bukowno, Krasawa, Kusięta, Olsztyn, Przymiłowice, Przymiłowice-Podgrabie, Skrajnica, Turów and Zrębice.

== Neighbouring gminas ==
Gmina Olsztyn is bordered by the city of Częstochowa and by the gminas of Janów, Kamienica Polska, Mstów, Poczesna, Poraj and Żarki.
