= Przymiłowice-Podgrabie =

- Village
- Location within Poland
- Coordinates: 50°45′34″N 19°19′54″E
- Country: Poland
- Voivodeship: Silesian
- County: Częstochowa
- Gmina: Olsztyn

Przymiłowice-Podgrabie [pʂɨmiwɔˈvit͡sɛ pɔdˈɡrabjɛ] is a village in the administrative district of Gmina Olsztyn, within Częstochowa County, Silesian Voivodeship, in southern Poland.
