= Skrajnica =

- Village
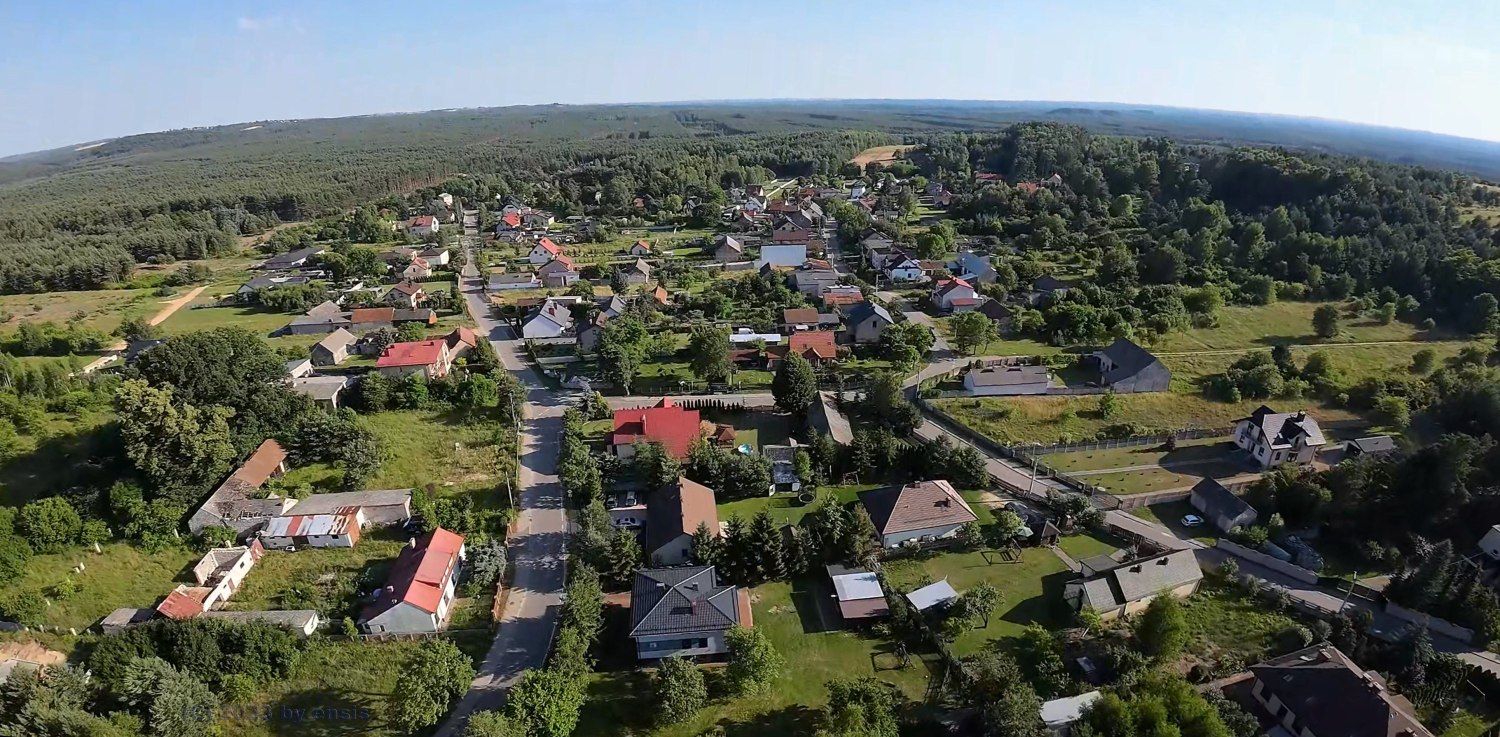

- Location within Poland
- Coordinates: 50°44′N 19°14′E
- Country: Poland
- Voivodeship: Silesian
- County: Częstochowa
- Gmina: Olsztyn
- Population: 272

Skrajnica [skrai̯ˈnit͡sa] is a village in the administrative district of Gmina Olsztyn, within Częstochowa County, Silesian Voivodeship, in southern Poland.
