= Turów, Silesian Voivodeship =

Turów
- Village
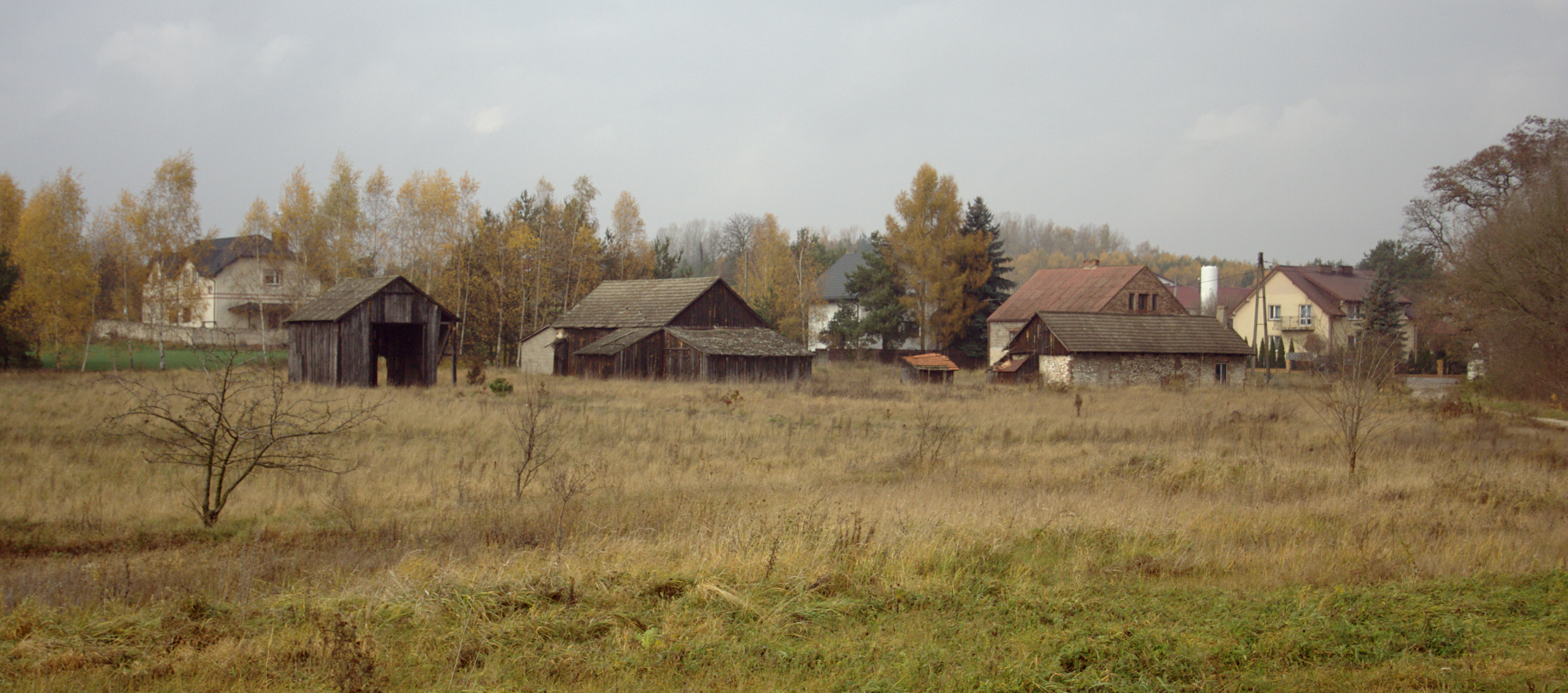

- Location within Poland
- Coordinates: 50°46′N 19°19′E
- Country: Poland
- Voivodeship: Silesian
- County: Częstochowa
- Gmina: Olsztyn
- Population: 559

Turów [ˈturuf] is a village in the administrative district of Gmina Olsztyn, within Częstochowa County, Silesian Voivodeship, in southern Poland.
