= Olsztyn Castle (Silesian Voivodeship) =

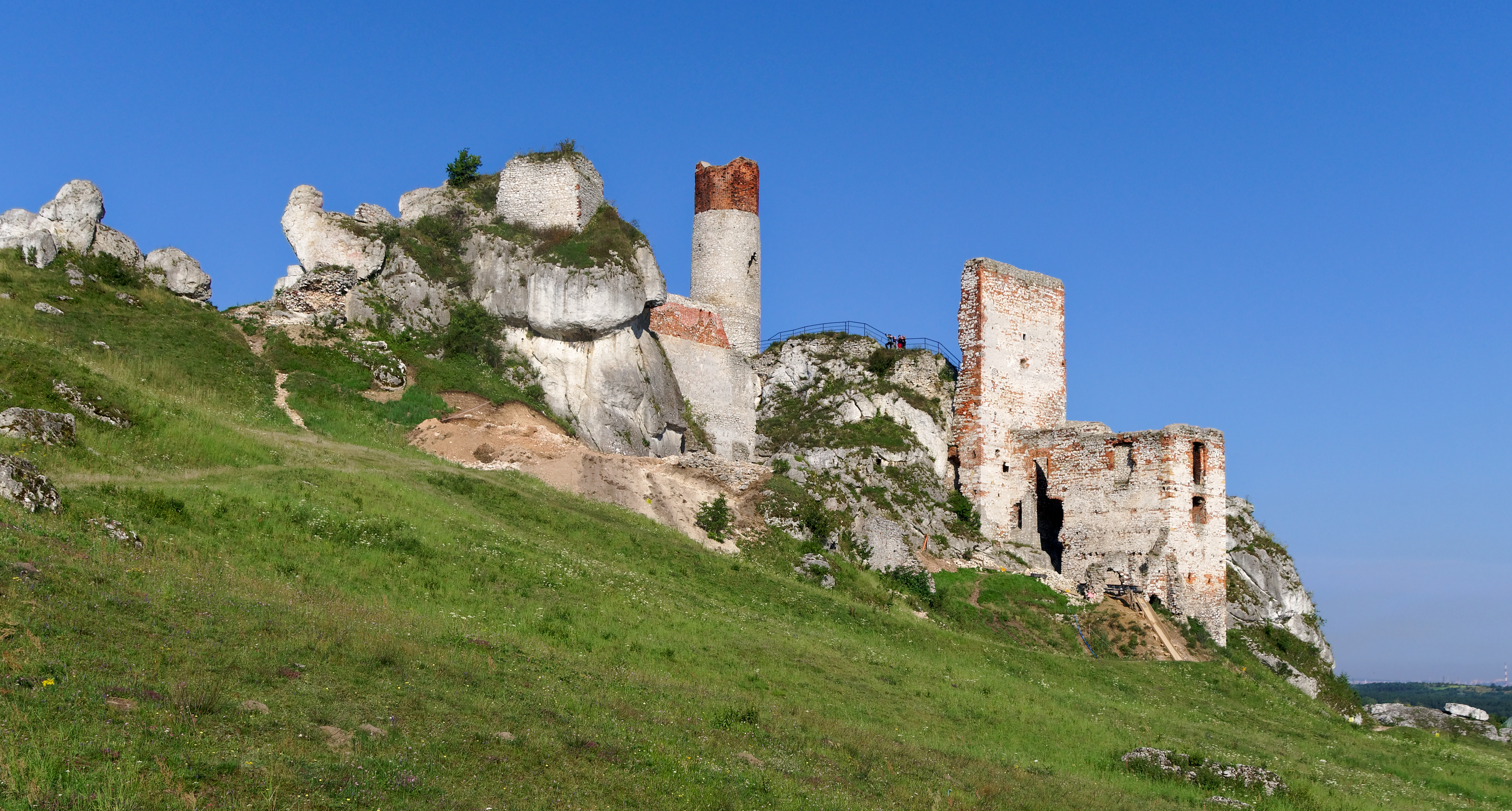
- Olsztyn Castle

- Location of Olsztyn Castle in Poland
- 50°44′58″N 19°16′26″E
- Location: Olsztyn, Silesian Voivodeship, in Poland

History
- Built: 14th century

Site notes
- Architectural style: Gothic

Olsztyn Castle (Polish: Zamek w Olsztynie) – castle ruins located in the Olsztyn, Silesian Voivodeship, Kraków-Częstochowa Upland, lying on the Trail of the Eagles' Nests – formerly protecting the southern border of the Kingdom of Poland. The ruins of the 14th-century castle are one of the biggest attractions of the area.

== History ==
The castle, located on a hill, among limestone rocks, is part of the Trail of the Eagles' Nests. It belonged to a system of fortifications, built by King Casimir III the Great, to protect western Lesser Poland from Czechs, to whom Silesia belonged at that time. For some time, as a fee, it belonged to Prince Władysław Opolczyk. Taken away from him in 1396, the castle was then handed by King Władysław II Jagiełło to a local nobleman, Jan Odrowąż of Szczekociny. The castle was invaded several times by Silesian princes in the 15th century, and with the advancement of warfare, its fortifications became obsolete. In 1655, it was captured by the Swedes, and since then, it became a ruin. In 1722, it was partly demolished, with bricks used to build a parish church at Olsztyn. Currently, only fragments of defensive walls remain. The most impressive still standing part of the castle is a 35-metre round tower, built in the 13th century, which served as a prison.

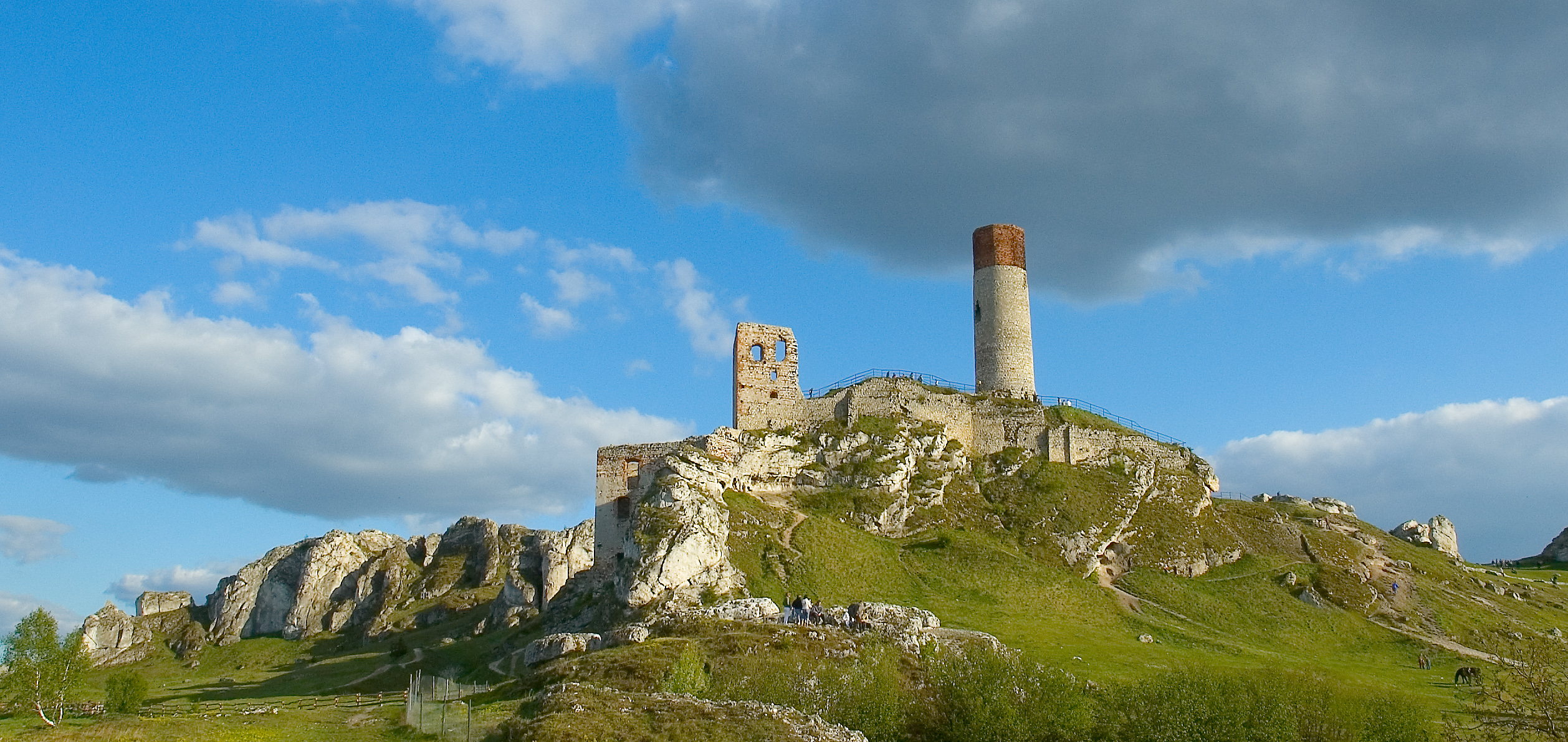
Panorama of Olsztyn Castle

== See also ==
- Castles in Poland
