= Olsztyn, Silesian Voivodeship =

Olsztyn
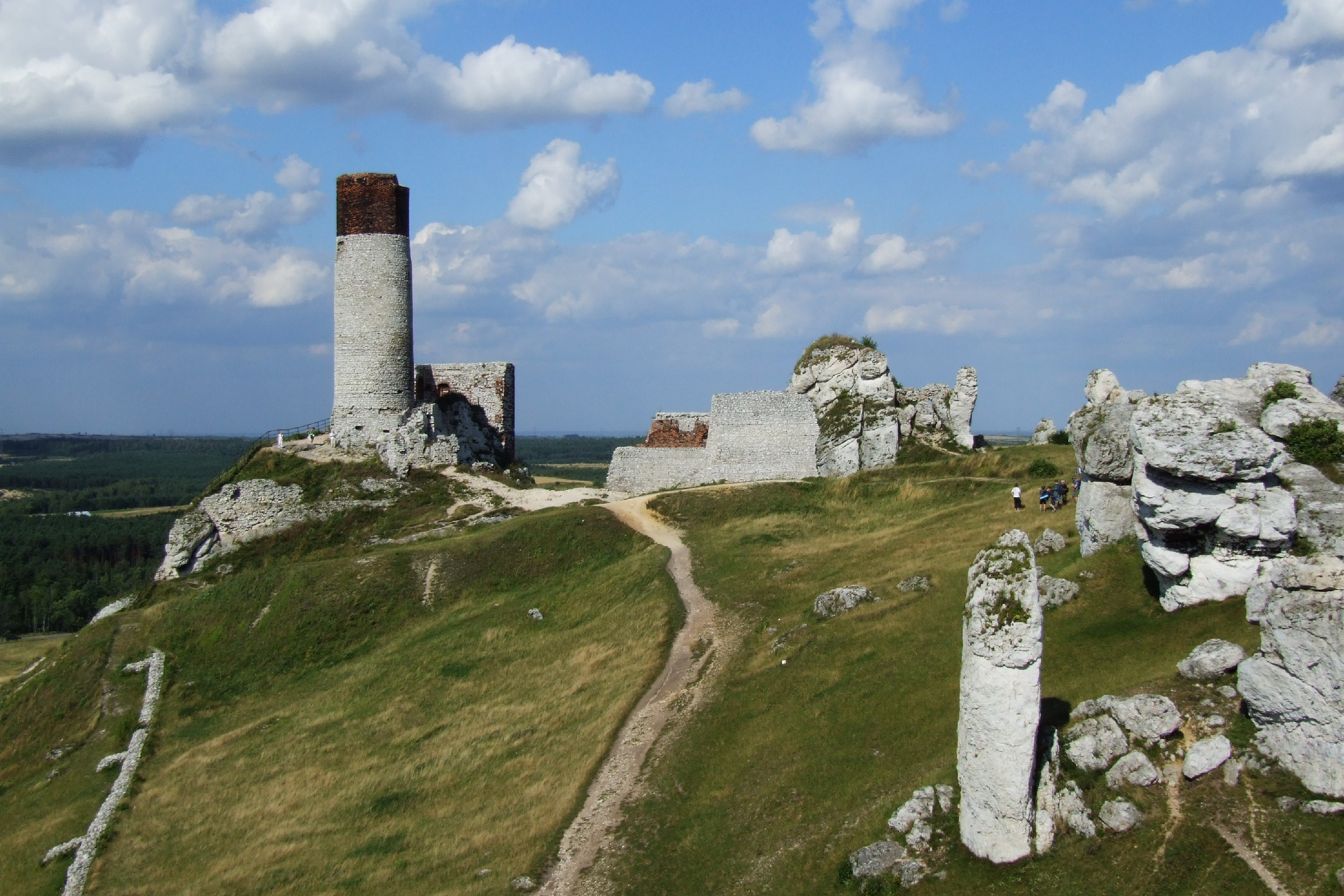
- Ruins of the Royal Castle in Olsztyn

- Flag Coat of arms

- Location within Poland
- Coordinates: 50°45′7″N 19°16′4″E
- Country: Poland
- Voivodeship: Silesian
- County: Częstochowa
- Gmina: Olsztyn
- First mentioned: 14th century
- Town rights: 1448
- Population: 2,331
- Time zone: UTC+1 (CET)
  - Summer (DST): UTC+2 (CEST)
- Vehicle registration: SCZ

Olsztyn [ˈɔlʂtɨn] is a town in Częstochowa County, Silesian Voivodeship, in southern Poland. It is the seat of the gmina (administrative district) called Gmina Olsztyn. The village has a population of 2,331. It contains the ruins of a 14th-century castle, which was located on a hill above the village.

== Name and location ==
Olsztyn belongs to Lesser Poland, and lies on the Trail of the Eagles' Nests, a popular tourist trail, which was named after a chain of 25 medieval castles which the trail passes by, between Częstochowa and Kraków. Its original name was Holsztyn, which is a Polonized version of the German word Holstein (or Hohlenstein); the name refers to German settlers, who founded the village in the Middle Ages (see Ostsiedlung, Walddeutsche).

== History ==
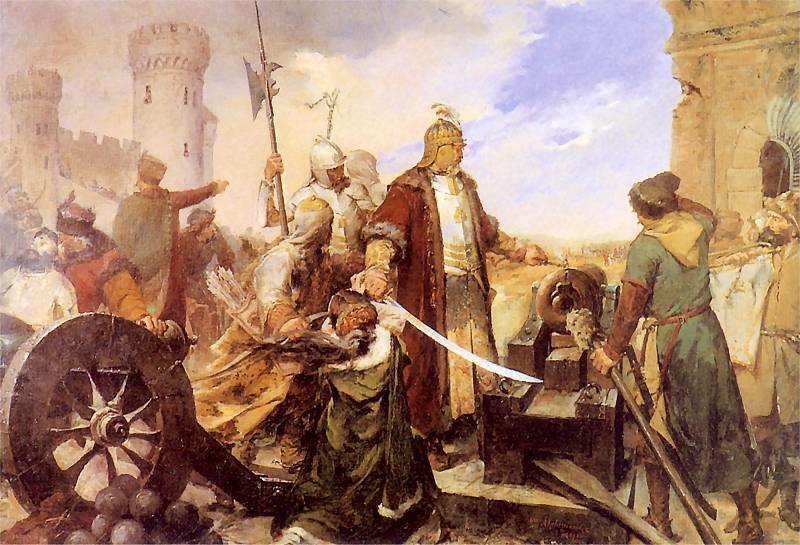
Polish defense of Olsztyn in 1587 (painting by Kazimierz Alchimowicz)

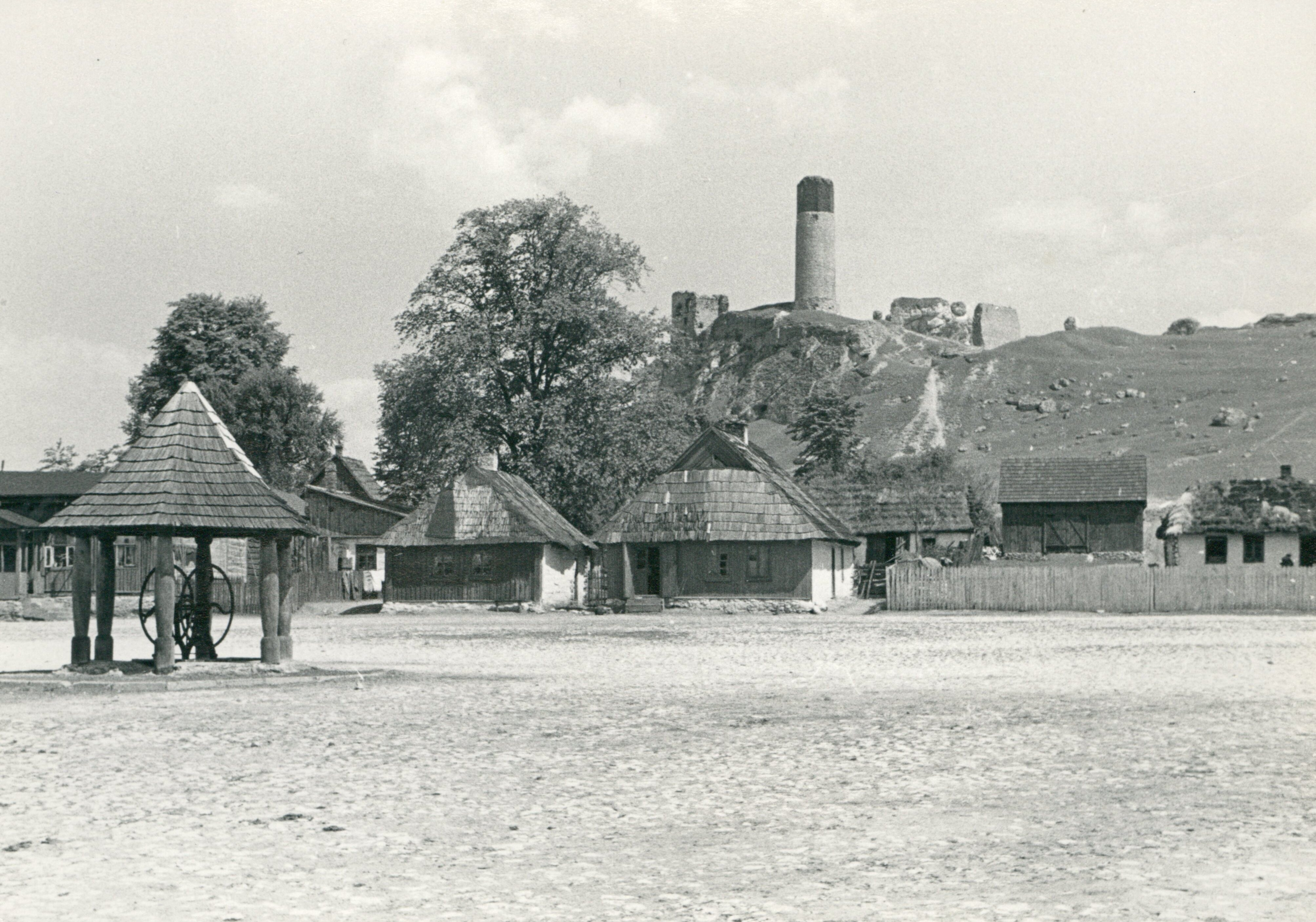
The market square and the castle in the 1930s

The first mentions of Olsztyn come from the beginning of the 14th century. At that time, it was a settlement, founded by the castle. In 1448, King Casimir IV Jagiellon granted it Magdeburg rights town charter, together with a privilege to organize fairs, which spurred Olsztyn's development. It was a royal town of Poland, administratively located in the Kraków Voivodeship in the Lesser Poland Province of the Kingdom of Poland, near the border with Silesia. In 1587, the Royal Castle was successfully defended by 80 Poles against 4,000 Austrians during the War of the Polish Succession, however, the town was destroyed. Further destruction was brought by the Swedish invasion of Poland (1655-1660). Finally, the town completely burned in 1719, and Olsztyn, despite officially keeping its town charter, turned into a rural settlement. After the Second Partition of Poland, in 1793, Olsztyn was annexed by Prussia. In 1807 it was regained by Poles and included within the short-lived Polish Duchy of Warsaw, and after its dissolution in 1815, Olsztyn belonged to Russian-controlled Congress Poland. The Russians reduced it to the status of a village in 1870. It was restored to independent Poland in 1918 when the country regained independence.

After the joint German-Soviet invasion of Poland, which started World War II in September 1939, Olsztyn was occupied by Germany until 1945. The Germans used local forests to carry out executions of inhabitants of Częstochowa and Radomsko, and captured Home Army soldiers, prisoners of war and villagers (see Nazi crimes against the Polish nation). Altogether, almost 2,000 people were massacred. Furthermore, the Germans also shot hundreds of Soviet POWs in 1941–1944 (see Nazi crimes against Soviet POWs). After the Warsaw Uprising, in October 1944, the Germans deported 1,800 Varsovians from the Dulag 121 camp in Pruszków, where they were initially imprisoned, to Olsztyn. Those Poles were mainly old people, ill people and women with children.

In March 2020, the councilors of the Olsztyn commune adopted a resolution on the initiation of the procedure for the restoration of municipal rights. In February of the following year, in public consultations, the majority of residents opted for the transformation into a town. The Council of Ministers issued an ordinance granting Olsztyn the status of a town on 1 January 2022.

== Attractions ==
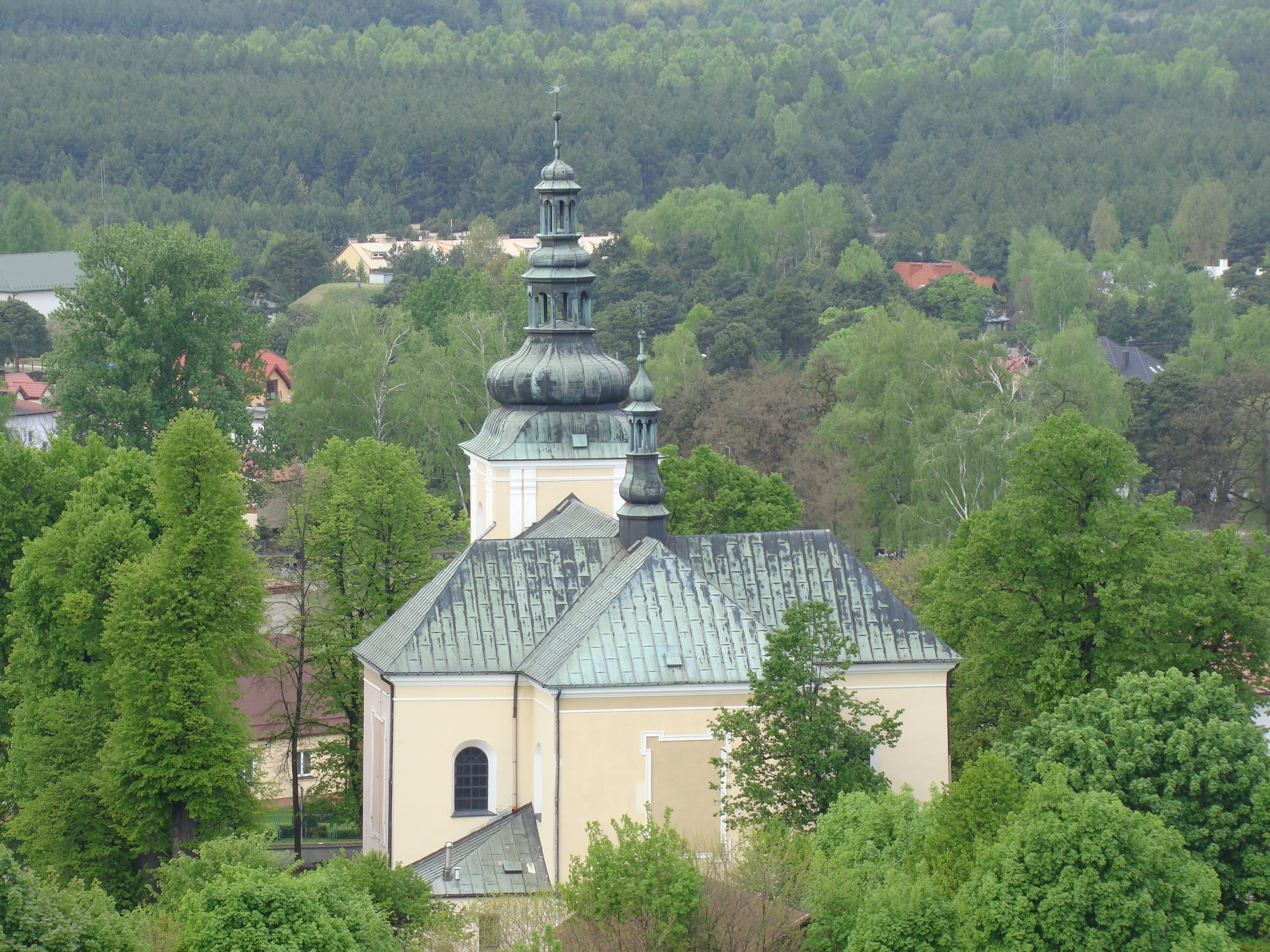
Baroque Church of St. John the Baptist

Near the castle in Olsztyn is the location of the parish church of St. John, built in 1722-26 by Jerzy Lubomirski. The church has the shape of a cross, with arms marked by two chapels. Inside there is a Baroque painting The Baptism of Christ, and three mummified bodies from the 18th century. At local cemetery there are bodies of hundreds of people, murdered by Germans during World War II. Furthermore, there are ashes of hundreds of Soviet POWs, shot by Germans in 1941–1944.

The Jewish commune during World War II was intensely defended by the resident Poles who refused to let the Germans take away their Jewish population. This led to barn burning and a large cull of horses in the area, which made the wandering Romany Gypsies easy targets for the oncoming Germans.
