= Silesian Voivodeship =

Voivodeship of Poland

Silesian Voivodeship Województwo śląskie
- Voivodeship
- Flag Coat of arms Brandmark

- Location within Poland

- Division into counties
- Coordinates (Katowice): 50°15′N 19°0′E
- Country: Poland
- Capital: Katowice
- Counties: 19 cities, 17 land counties*: Bielsko-Biała; Bytom; Chorzów; Częstochowa; Dąbrowa Górnicza; Gliwice; Jastrzębie-Zdrój; Jaworzno; Katowice; Mysłowice; Piekary Śląskie; Ruda Śląska; Rybnik; Siemianowice Śląskie; Sosnowiec; Świętochłowice; Tychy; Zabrze; Żory; Będzin County; Bielsko County; Bieruń-Lędziny County; Cieszyn County; Częstochowa County; Gliwice County; Kłobuck County; Lubliniec County; Mikołów County; Myszków County; Pszczyna County; Racibórz County; Rybnik County; Tarnowskie Góry County; Wodzisław County; Zawiercie County; Żywiec County

Government
  - Body: Silesian Voivodeship executive board
  - Voivode: Marek Wójcik (PO)
  - Marshal: Wojciech Saługa (PO)
  - EP: Silesian

Area
  - Total: 12,333.09 km^{2} (4,761.83 sq mi)

Population (2019-06-30)
  - Total: 4,524,091
  - Density: 366.8254/km^{2} (950.0735/sq mi)
  - Urban: 3,468,527
  - Rural: 1,055,564

GDP
  - Total: €97.391 billion (2024)
  - Per capita: €23,244 (2024)
- Time zone: UTC+1 (CET)
  - Summer (DST): UTC+2 (CEST)
- ISO 3166 code: PL-24
- Vehicle registration: S
- HDI (2023): 0.910 very high · 5th
- Primary airport: Katowice Airport
- Website: www.slaskie.pl
- * further divided into 167 gminas

Silesian Voivodeship (Polish: województwo śląskie [vɔjɛˈvut͡stfɔ ˈɕlɔ̃skʲɛ]) is an administrative province in southern Poland. With over 4.2 million residents and an area of 12,300 square kilometers, it is the second-most populous, and the most-densely populated and most-urbanized region of Poland. It generates 11.9% of Polish GDP and is characterized by a high life satisfaction, low income inequalities, and high wages.

The region has a diversified geography. The Beskid Mountains cover most of the southern part of the voivodeship, with the highest peak of Pilsko on the Polish–Slovak border reaching 1,534 m (5,033 ft) above sea level. Silesian Upland dominates the central part of the region, while the hilly, limestone Polish Jura closes it from the northeast. Katowice urban area, located in the central part of the region, is the second most-populous urban area in Poland after Warsaw, with 2.2 million people, and one of Poland's seven supra-regional metropolises, while Rybnik, Bielsko-Biała and Częstochowa and their respective urban areas are classified among the country's 15 regional agglomerations.

Despite the voivodeship's name, only the western half of its area is considered to be a part of the historical region of Silesia. The eastern part of Silesian Voivodeship was historically part of Lesser Poland, while a small part in the north of the region was historically considered a part of Greater Poland.

== History ==
=== Interwar Poland ===
Silesian Voivodeship was first created in 1920 when the newly independent Polish state established an autonomous region for all historical lands of Upper Silesia that were to end up in Poland. At the time, Upper Silesia was under international control, and a plebiscite was to be held in 1921 to divide the region between Germany and Poland following local results. Katowice has been chosen to be the provincial capital. In 1938, following the annexation of Trans-Olza region by Poland, the voivodeship's area was expanded to include these new territories.

The interwar region did not include more than half of its current area, which were parts of the Kielce voivodeship (Sosnowiec and Częstochowa areas), Kraków voivodeship (Jaworzno and Żywiec areas) or Germany (cities of Zabrze and Bytom as well as Gliwice and Racibórz areas).

=== German occupation ===
After the invasion of Poland in 1939, Polish administrative divisions ceased to exist. Nazi Germany annexed most of the current voivodeship's area directly into the German province of Silesia (Gau Schlesien) with capital in Wrocław (Breslau) as the governmental district of Katowice (Regierungsbezirk Kattowitz). This new district included both historically Silesian areas as well as western parts of Lesser Poland. Northern parts of what is the Silesian Voivodeship today, with Częstochowa, found themselves in the General Government area.

In 1941, the province of Silesia was split into Lower Silesia (with a capital in Wrocław) and Upper Silesia (with a capital in Katowice), the latter of which included the governmental district of Opole in addition to the one of Katowice.

=== Socialist Poland ===
Following World War II, the new communist government of Poland cancelled the autonomous status of the Silesian voivodeship and established a new Silesian-Dabrowa voivodeship (województwo śląsko-dąbrowskie), the area of which roughly corresponded to the German province of Upper Silesia. The name of this region reflected both the Silesian part and the Dąbrowa Basin part.

In 1950, Opole voivodeship was created from the western part of the Silesian-Dabrowa voivodeship, and the name of the remaining area changed to Katowice Voivodeship. The new region's borders included, for the first time, the Częstochowa area, and roughly resembled the contemporary Silesian Voivodeship. Between 1953–56, the name of the region was changed to Stalinogród voivodeship (województwo stalinogrodzkie), reflecting Katowice's forced name change to Stalinogród following the death of Joseph Stalin.

In 1975, a new administrative reform introduced 49 new voivodeships. The area of today's Silesian Voivodeship was divided between Częstochowa voivodeship (województwo częstochowskie) in the north, Katowice voivodeship (województwo katowickie) in the center, and Bielsko-Biała voivodeship (województwo bielskie) in the south.

=== After 1989 ===
As Poland aimed to join the European Union, European negotiators named administrative reform as one of the conditions for accession. As such, in 1999, a new administrative division was introduced, reducing the number of voivodeships from 49 to 16. A Silesian voivodeship has emerged from the reform, with its capital in Katowice, and consisting of most municipalities of the former Katowice, Częstochowa, and Bielsko-Biała voivodeships.

== Geography ==
The Silesian Voivodeship borders both the Moravian-Silesian Region (Czech Republic), Žilina Region (Slovakia) to the south. It is also bordered by four other Polish voivodeships: those of Opole (to the west), Łódź (to the north), Świętokrzyskie (to the north-east), and Lesser Poland (to the east).

The region includes the Silesian Upland (Wyżyna Śląska) in the centre and north-west, and the Krakowsko-Częstochowska Upland (Jura Krakowsko-Czestochowska) in the north-east. The southern border is formed by the Beskidy Mountains (Beskid Śląski and Beskid Żywiecki).

The current administrative unit of Silesian Voivodeship is just one fraction of the historical Silesia region which is within the borders of today's Poland (there are also fragments of Silesia in the Czech Republic and Germany). Other parts of today's Polish Silesia are administered as the Opole, the Lower Silesian Voivodeships and the Lubusz Voivodeship. On the other hand, a large part of the current administrative unit of the Silesian Voivodeship is not part of historical Silesia (e.g., Częstochowa, Zawiercie, Myszków, Jaworzno, Sosnowiec, Żywiec, Dąbrowa Górnicza, Będzin and east part of Bielsko-Biała, which were historically parts of Lesser Poland).

== Demography ==
Historical population
Year	Pop.	±%
1988	4,907,919	—
2002	4,742,874	−3.4%
2011	4,630,366	−2.4%
2021	4,402,950	−4.9%

=== Population ===
More than one out of every nine of Poland's residents live in the Silesian voivodeship. According to the Polish Statistics Office, the region's population was 4.32 million at the end of 2023, a decrease of 6% from 10 years earlier.

Similarly to Poland, the Silesian voivodeship has suffered extremely low fertility and an intensifying natural population decrease. In 2023, the total fertility rate was only 1.10, well below the 2.1 required to sustain a population size and slightly below the Polish average of 1.11. 27,641 people were born while 51,723 died, a natural decrease of -24,082. In 2023, 19.1% of the population was under 20, 32.2% was 20–44 years old, 27.4% was 45–64, while 21.3% were 65 or older.

Silesian voivodeship is the most densely populated and most urbanized region of Poland. More than three-fourths of residents live in urban areas, compared to less than 60% on average in Poland. Population density is nearly three times the average, with more than 350 people per square kilometer (nearly 1,000 per square mile). Population density is particularly high in the central part of the region where the polycentric Katowice urban area is located.

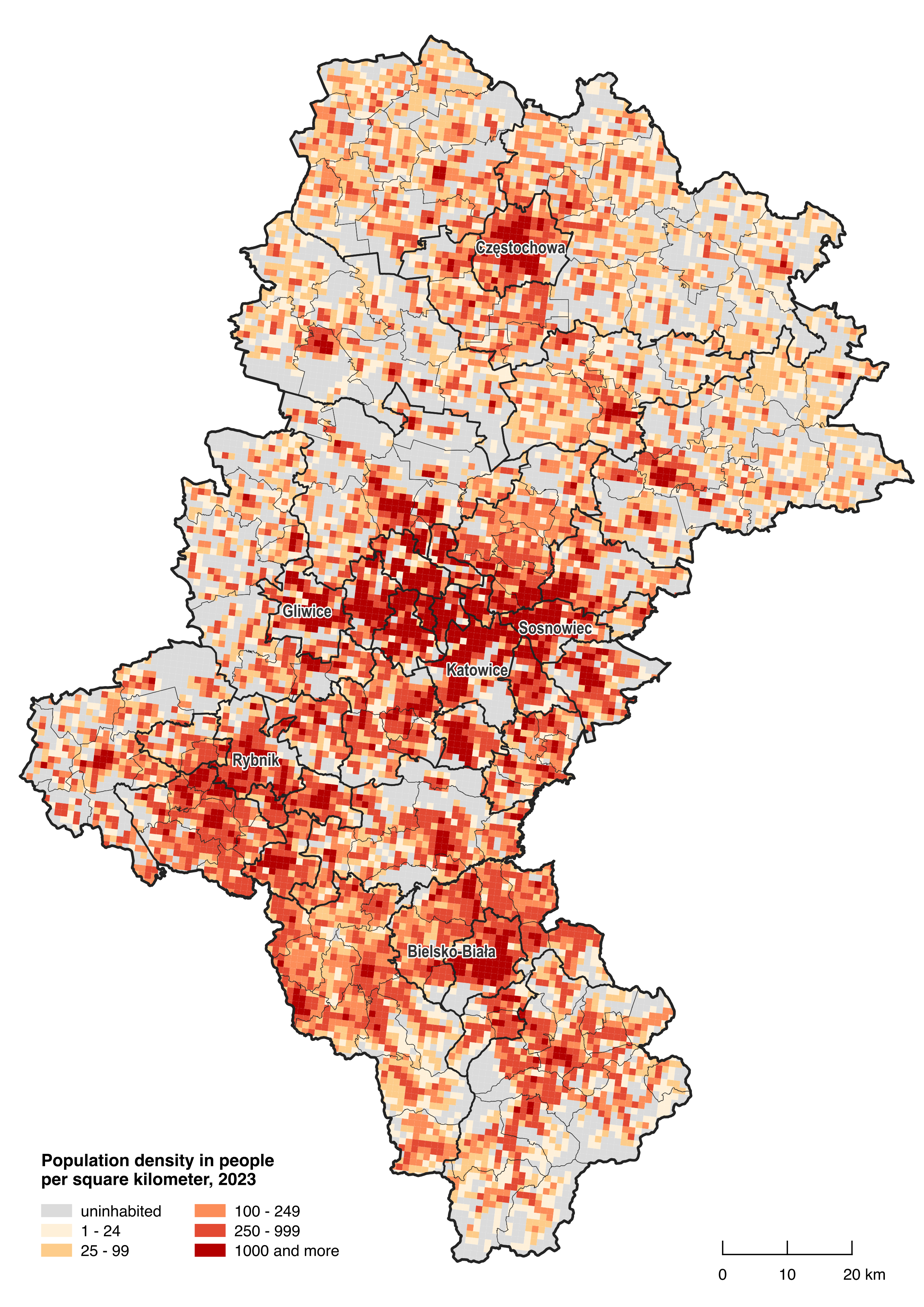
Population density in the region

Aside from Polish citizens, a large immigrant population resides in the region and is not counted towards official population statistics in Poland. As of November 2024, 99,542 foreigners living in the region paid into social security, and in the 2023/24 academic year, 31,111 foreign students attended primary and secondary schools in the region. In addition, following the 2022 Russian invasion of Ukraine, the region has attracted many refugees. As of January 2025, 99,545 Ukrainian refugees settled in the Silesian voivodeship.

=== Religion ===
Silesian voivodeship is the most religiously diverse region of Poland. In the 2021 census, 71.39% of residents declared they have belonged to a religion, of which Roman Catholicism was the largest denomination with 3.063 million adherents (69.57% of total). The region is divided into five ecclesial provinces:

- Archdiocese of Katowice with its suffragan Diocese of Gliwice covers all of the former Prussian lands in the voivodeship
- Diocese of Bielsko-Żywiec covers all of the former Austro-Hungarian lands in the voivodeship and is a suffragan to the Archdiocese of Kraków
- Archdiocese of Częstochowa with its suffragan Diocese of Sosnowiec covers all of the former Russian lands in the voivodeship

Jasna Góra in Częstochowa, located in the northern part of the voivodeship, is the most-visited shrine in Poland and features the Black Madonna icon.

Silesian voivodeship is also the center of Protestantism, in particular Lutheranism, in Poland. Wisła and Goleszów are the only municipalities in Poland where Lutheranism is the plurality religion, at 46.7% and 37.47% of the total population, respectively. In total, there are 53,980 Protestants in the region (1.23% of the region's population and 42.7% of all protestants in Poland).

=== Origins ===
In terms of nationality and ethnicity, the 2021 Polish census allowed responders to select up to two nationalities and ethnicities. Polish nationality was selected by 95.49% of residents, while 13.08% indicated other nationalities; in addition to the Polish one or separately. Silesian and German nationalities were the largest, declared by 517,100 and 27,923 residents, respectively.

The 2021 census did not count most of recent immigrants towards the resident population but instead considered them as temporary residents. According to the census, 119,594 of such temporary residents lived in the Silesian voivodeship, and the majority of them were Ukrainians.

== Tourism ==
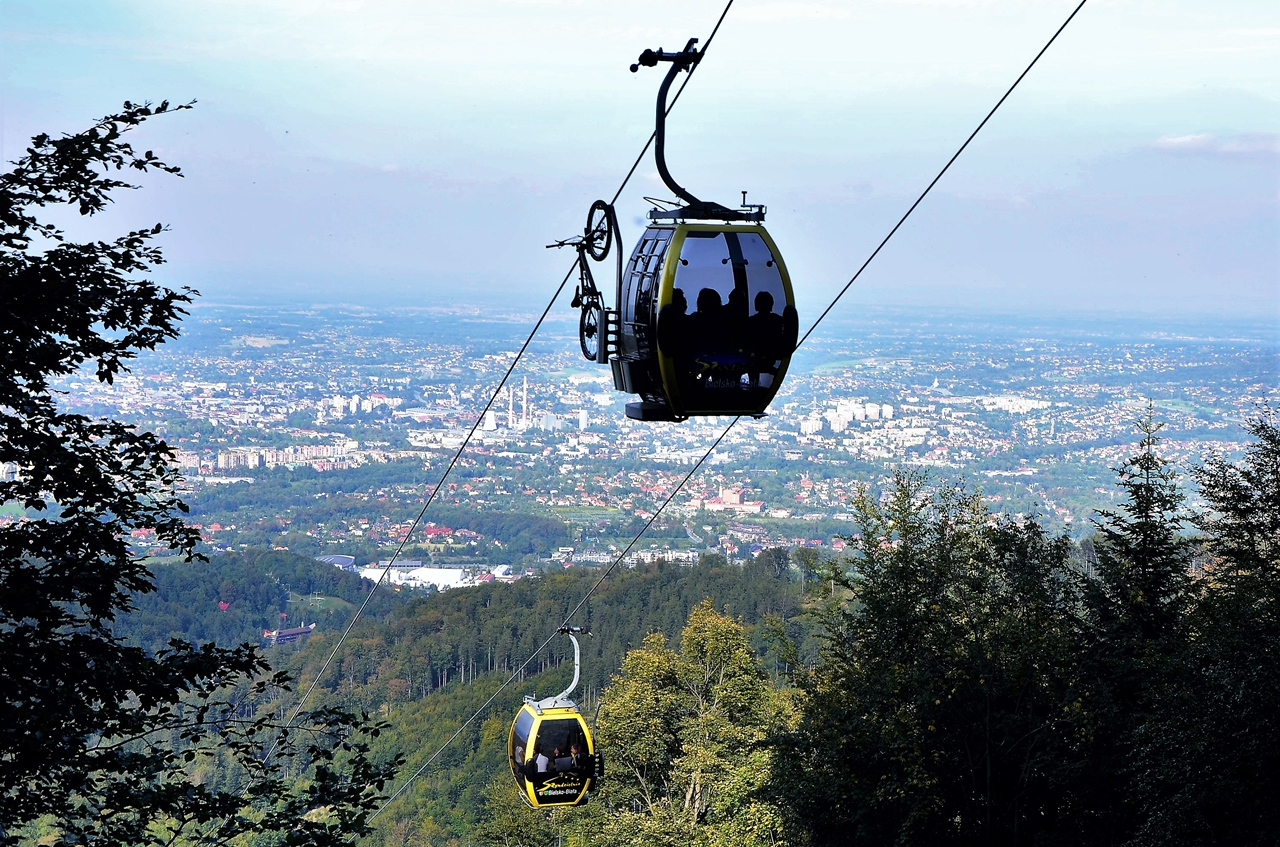
"Szyndzielnia" gondola lift in Bielsko-Biała, north part of Beskid Śląski

Both the northern and southern parts of the voivodeship are surrounded by a green belt. Bielsko-Biała is enveloped by the Beskidy Mountains which are popular with winter sports fans. It offers over 150 ski lifts and 200 kilometres of ski routes. More and more slopes are illuminated and equipped with artificial snow generators. Szczyrk, Brenna, Wisła and Ustroń are the most popular winter mountain resorts. Rock climbing sites can be found in Jura Krakowsko-Czestochowska. In the south-western part of the voivodeship are parks and old monasteries (Rudy Raciborskie, Wodzisław Śląski). Along the Oder River are interesting natural reserves and places for swimming during the summer.

There are numerous castles and palaces in the voivodeship, including the medieval castles of the Piast dynasty in Będzin, Gliwice, Racibórz, and the castles forming the Trail of the Eagle's Nests, including at Bobolice, Mirów, Ogrodzieniec and Olsztyn. The best-preserved palaces include those at Brynek, Kłobuck, Koniecpol, Kończyce Wielkie, Pławniowice, Sosnowiec and Złoty Potok.

Often visited is the Black Madonna's Jasna Góra Sanctuary in Częstochowa – the annual destination of over 4 million pilgrims from all over the world. Another local pilgrimage destination is the Basilica of St. Mary and St. Bartholomew in Piekary Śląskie. Other notable historic churches include the St. Nicholas' Chapel in Cieszyn, a Romanesque rotunda, depicted on the 20 złotych note, and the St. Mary Magdalene Church in Cieszyn, which contains several sarcophagi of Polish dukes from the Piast dynasty.

There are three spa towns in the voivodeship: Goczałkowice-Zdrój, Jastrzębie-Zdrój, and Ustroń.

With its more than two centuries of industrial history, the region has many technical heritage memorials. These include narrow and standard gauge railways, coal and silver mines, and shafts and their equipment from the 19th and 20th centuries. The historic coal mine complex in Zabrze is listed as a Historic Monument of Poland, and the Historic Silver Mine in Tarnowskie Góry is listed as both a UNESCO World Heritage Site and Historic Monument of Poland.

There are numerous memorials to Polish uprisings against foreign rule, including the January Uprising of 1863–1864 and Silesian Uprisings of 1919–1921, and Świętochłowice hosts the Silesian Uprisings Museum.

There are numerous World War II memorials in the voivodeship, including at the sites of Nazi massacres of Poles and Jews, and the sites of former Nazi German forced labour camps and prisons. The Gliwice Radio Tower and Katowice Parachute Tower are local symbols of German provocation and Polish resistance during the war, respectively.

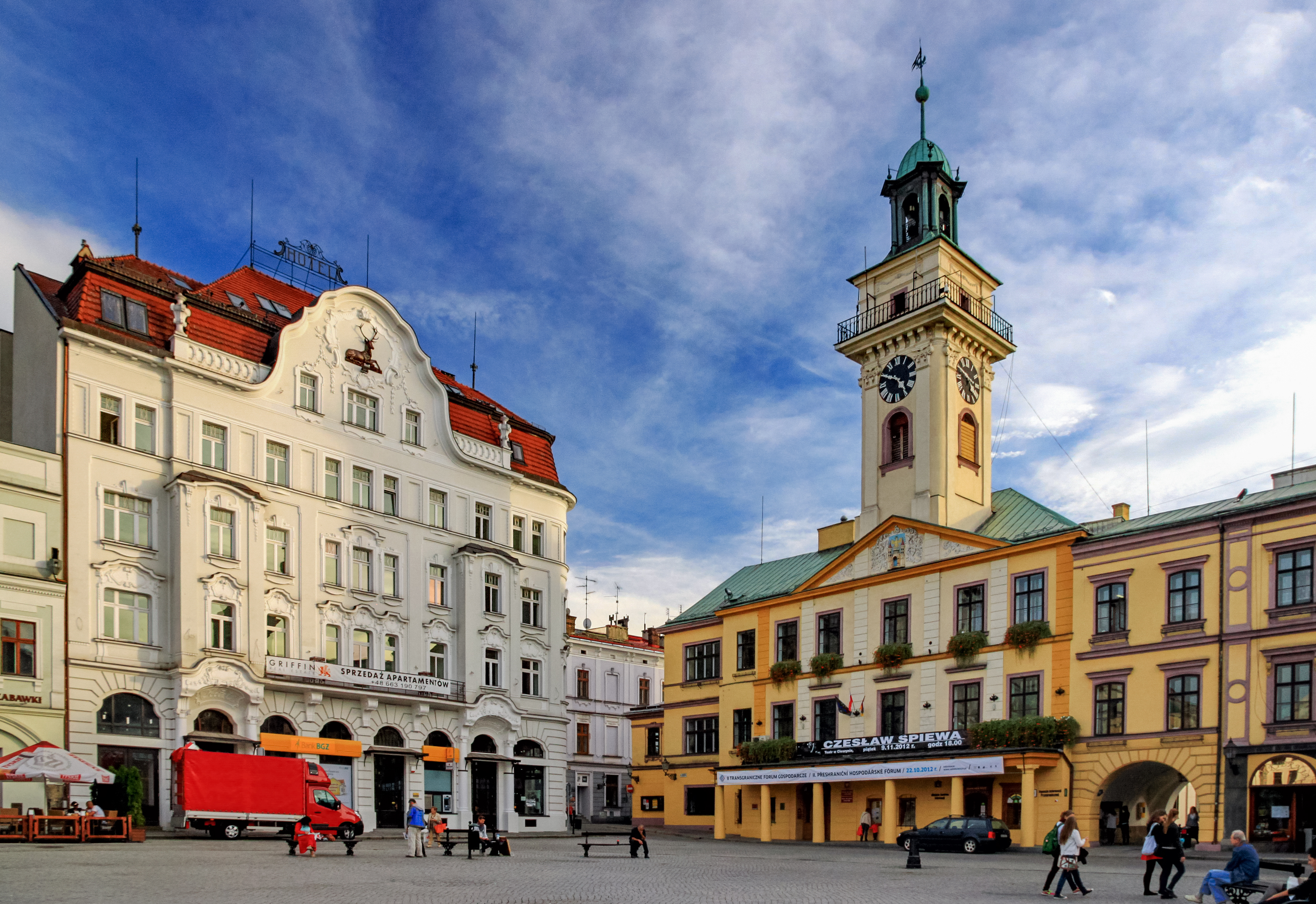
Cieszyn Old Town

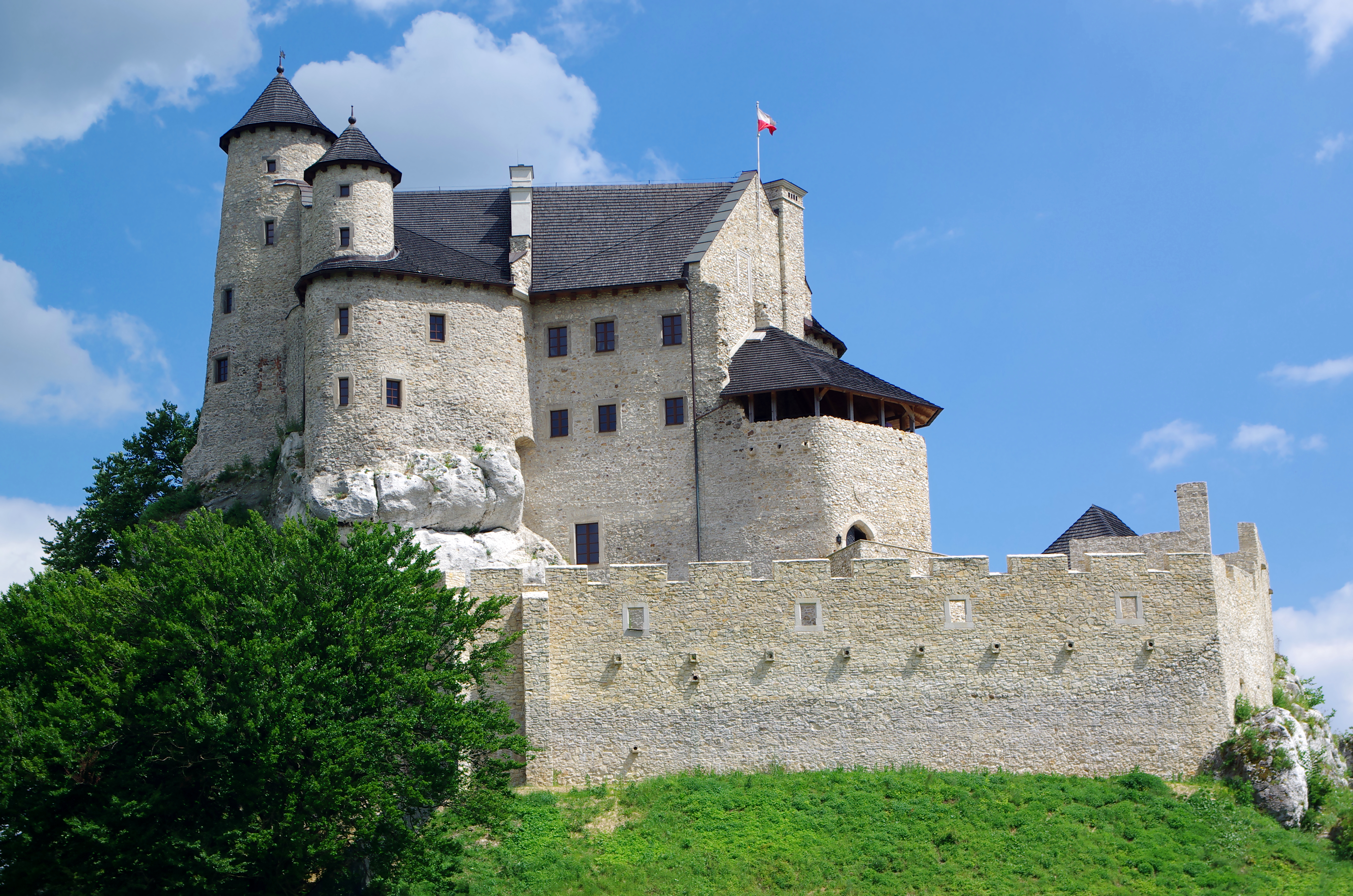
Bobolice Royal Castle

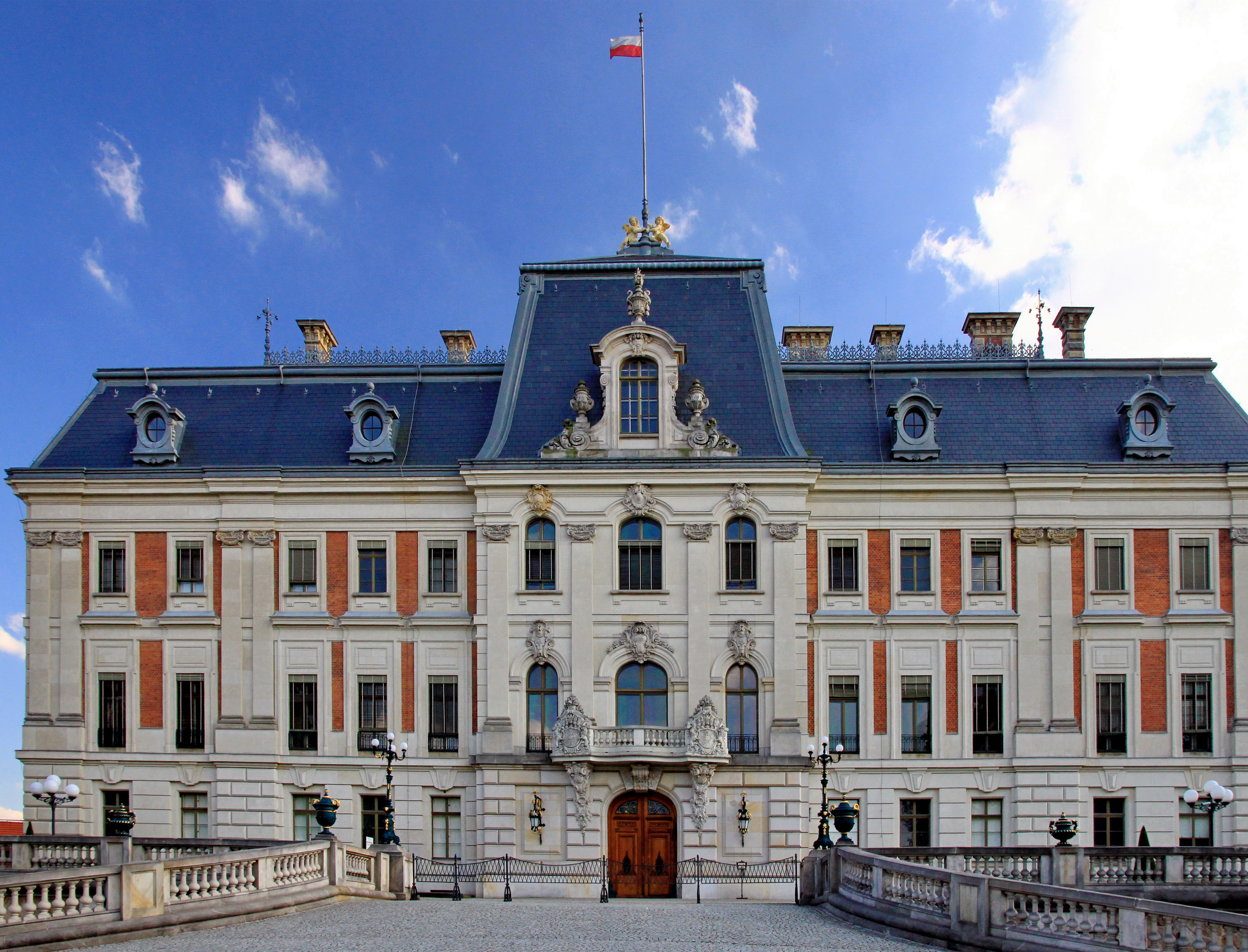
Pszczyna Castle in Pszczyna

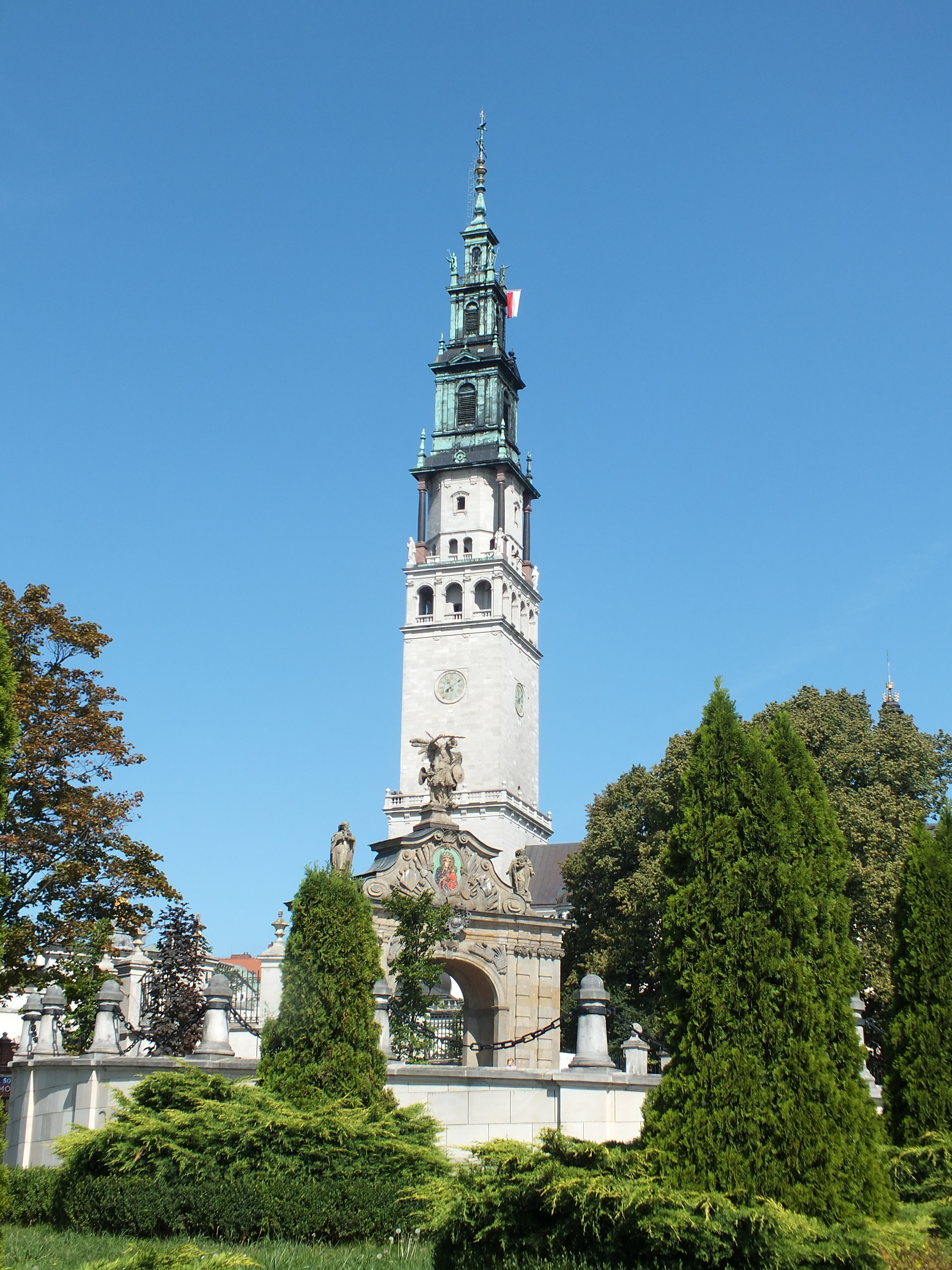
Jasna Góra Monastery

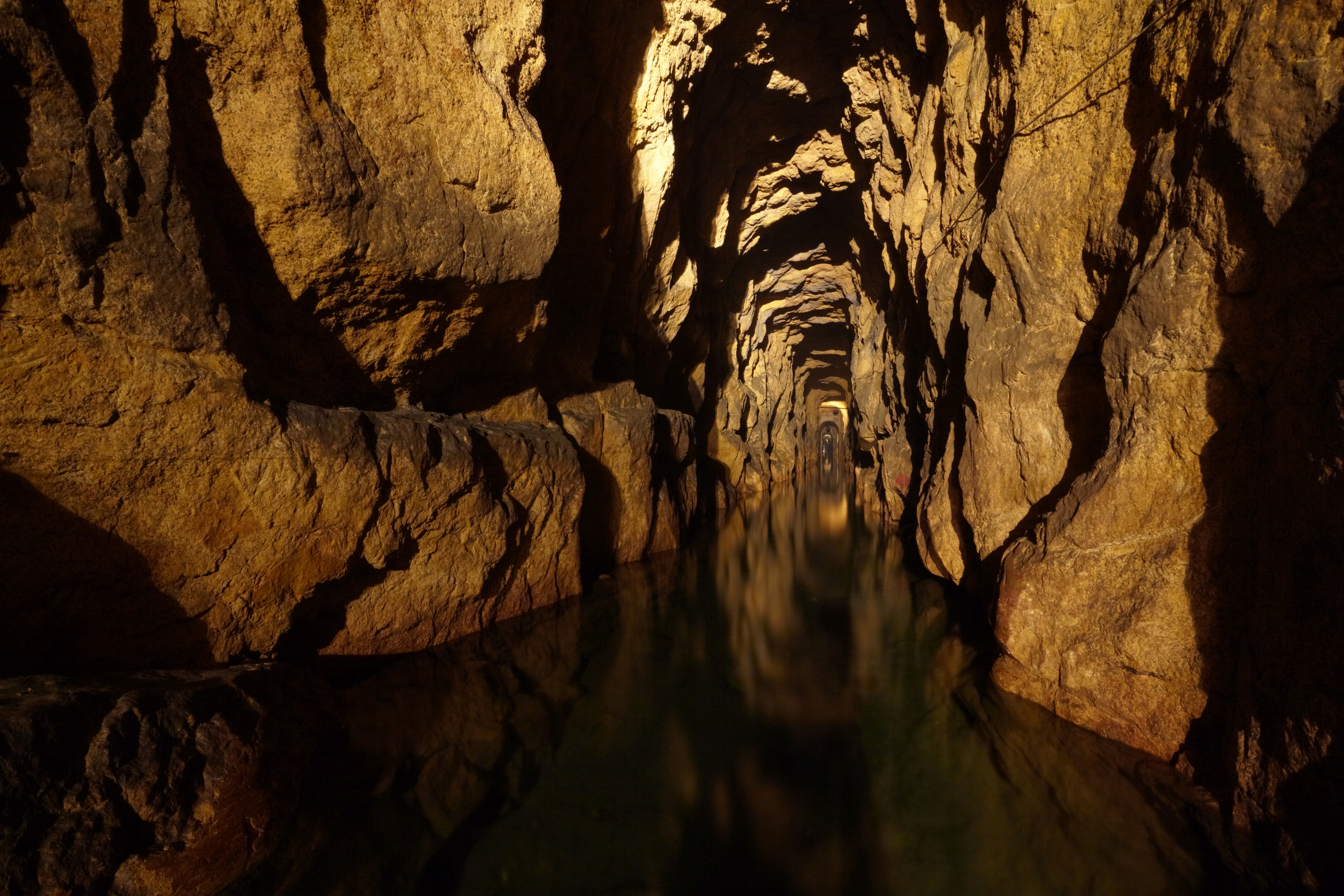
Historic Silver Mine in Tarnowskie Góry

== Cities and towns ==
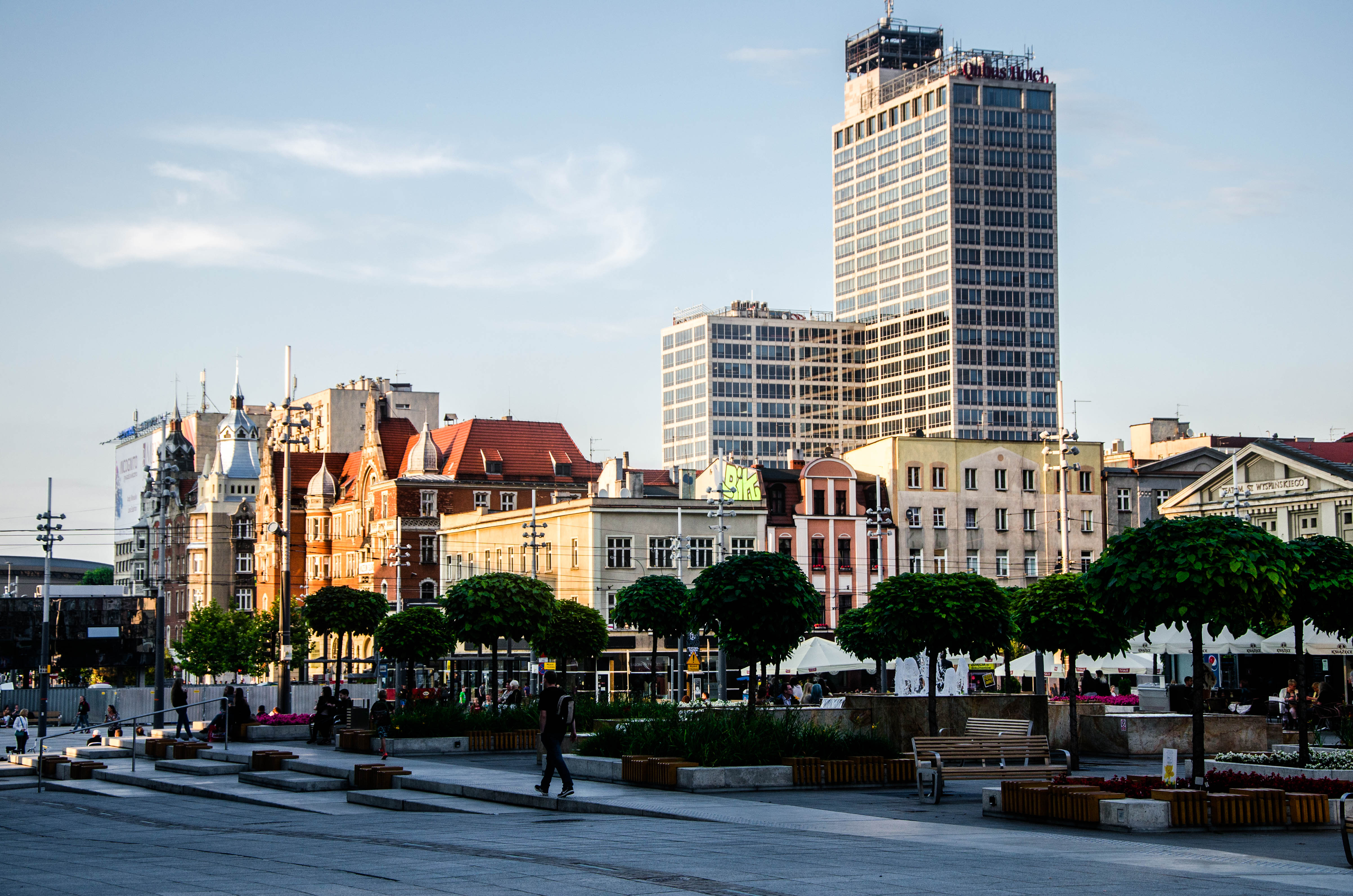
Katowice is the capital of the Silesian Voivodeship

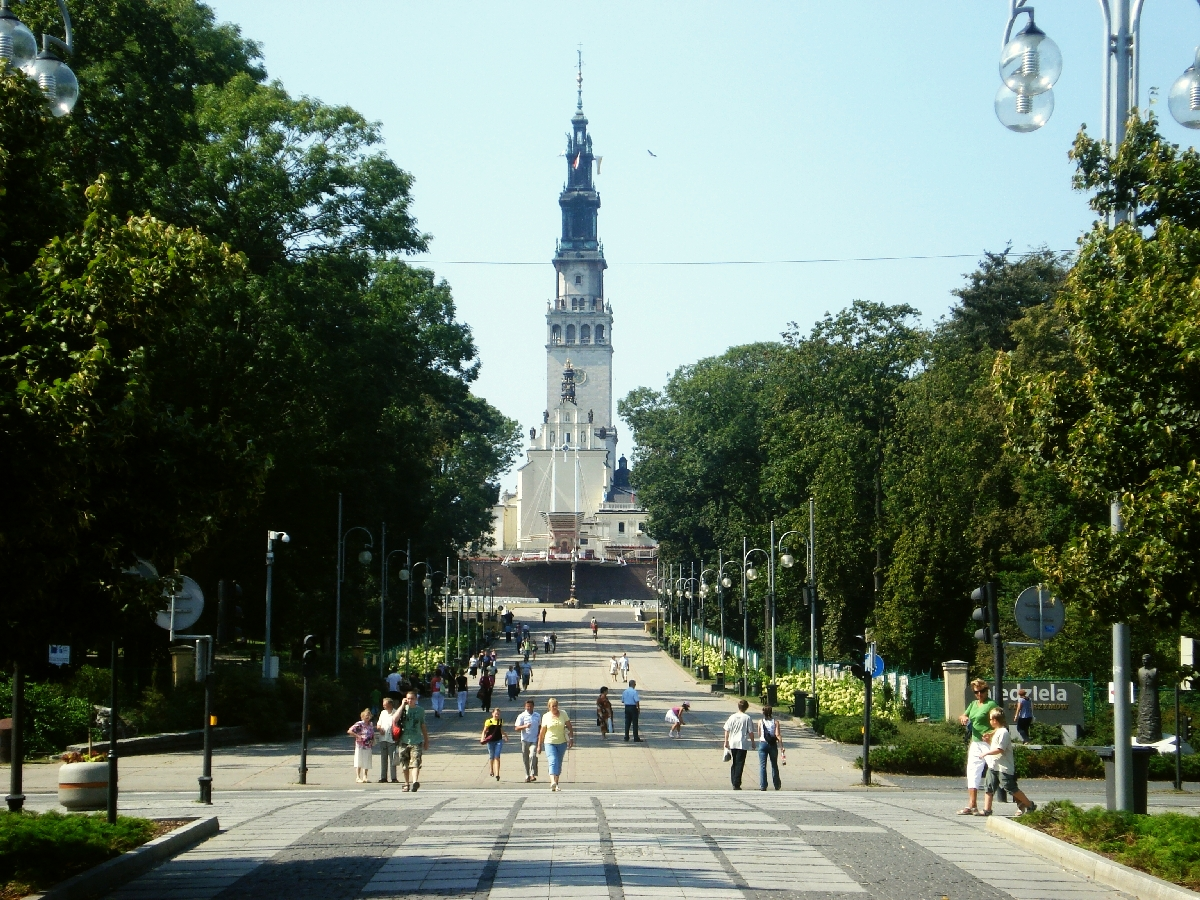
Jasna Góra in Częstochowa is the holiest Roman Catholic shrine in Poland

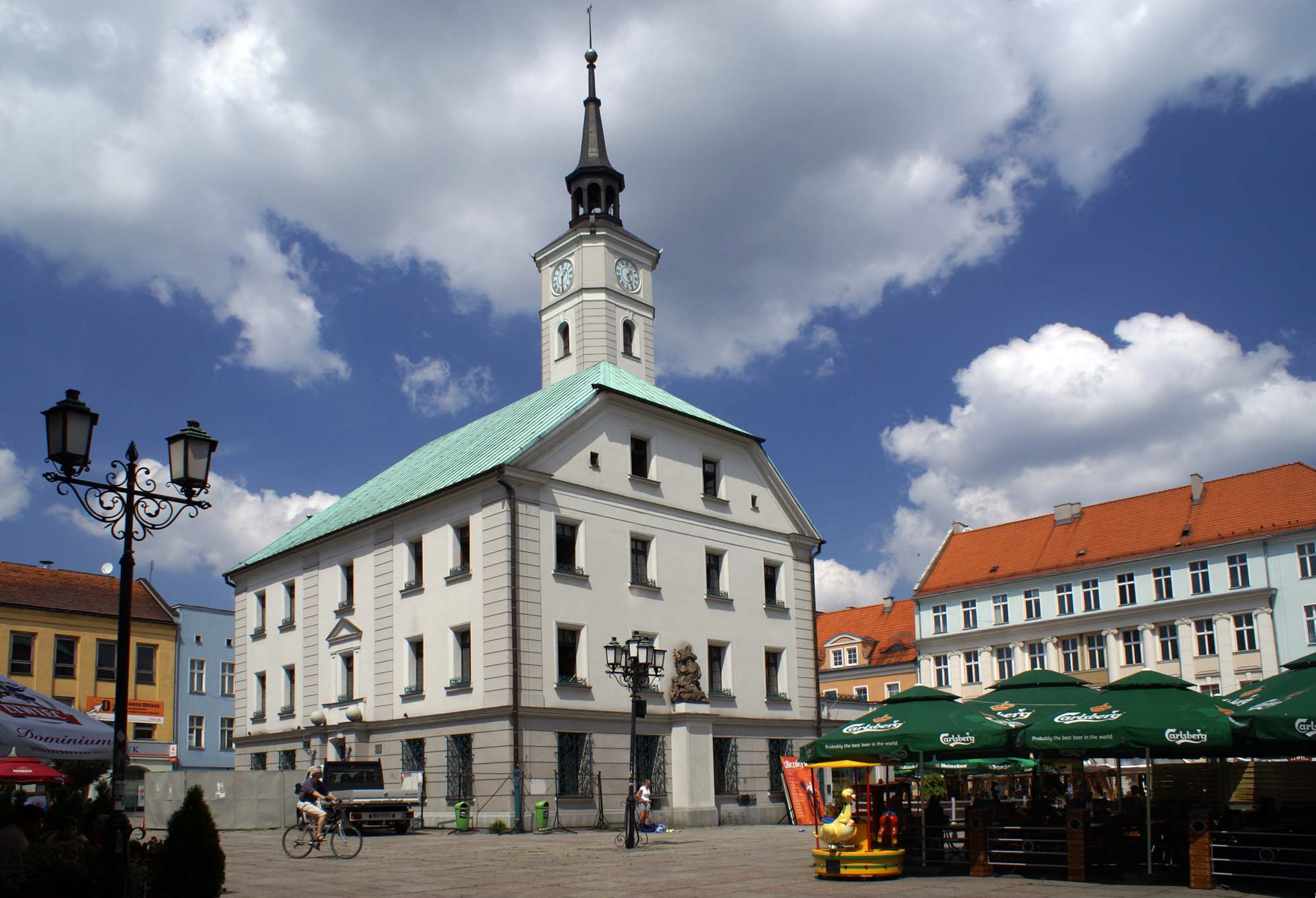
Gliwice, one of the oldest cities in Silesia

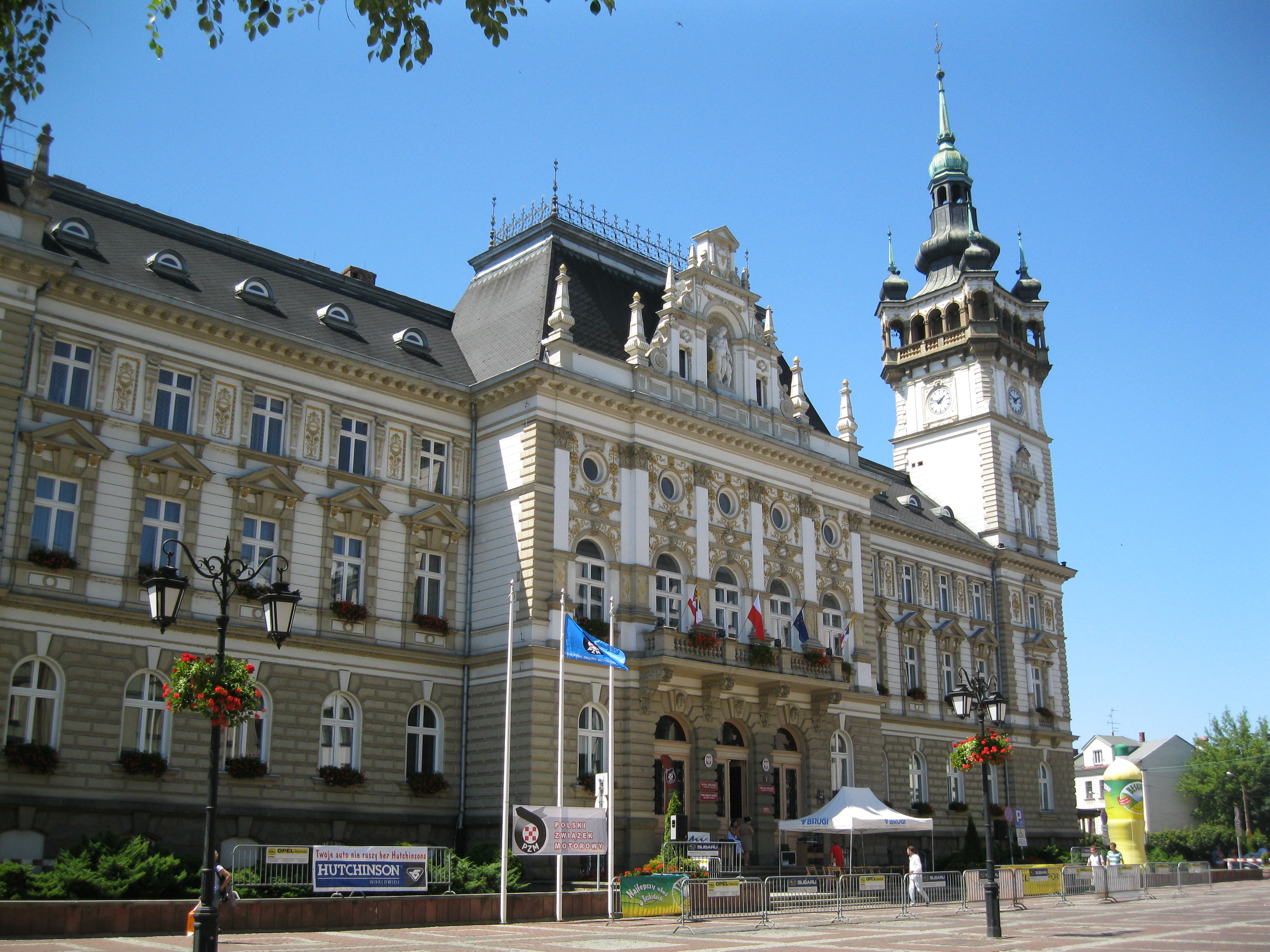
Bielsko-Biała is a major industrial, transport and touristic hub

Due to its industrial and urban nature, the voivodeship has many cities and large towns. Of Poland's 40 most populous cities, 12 are in Silesian Voivodeship. 19 of the cities in the voivodeship have the legal status of city-county (see powiat). In all, it has 24 cities and 47 towns, listed below in descending order of population (as of 2019):

Cities (governed by a city mayor or prezydent miasta):
1. Katowice (293,636)
2. Częstochowa (221,252)
3. Sosnowiec (201,121)
4. Gliwice (179,154)
5. Zabrze (172,806)
6. Bielsko-Biała (170,953)
7. Bytom (165,975)
8. Rybnik (138,319)
9. Ruda Śląska (137,624)
10. Tychy (127,664)
11. Dąbrowa Górnicza (119,800)
12. Chorzów (107,963)
13. Jaworzno (91,263)
14. Jastrzębie-Zdrój (88,808)
15. Mysłowice (74,515)
16. Siemianowice Śląskie (66,963)
17. Żory (62,462)
18. Będzin (56,624)
19. Piekary Śląskie (55,088)
20. Racibórz (54,778)
21. Świętochłowice (49,762)
22. Zawiercie (49,334)
23. Wodzisław Śląski (47,992)
24. Knurów (38,310)

Towns:

1. Tarnowskie Góry (61,422)
2. Mikołów (40,898)
3. Czechowice-Dziedzice (35,926)
4. Cieszyn (34,513)
5. Myszków (31,650)
6. Czeladź (31,545)
7. Żywiec (31,194)
8. Czerwionka-Leszczyny (28,156)
9. Pszczyna (26,804)
10. Lubliniec (23,784)
11. Łaziska Górne (22,298)
12. Rydułtowy (21,616)
13. Orzesze (21,043)
14. Bieruń (19,539)
15. Pyskowice (18,432)
16. Radlin (17,776)
17. Radzionków (16,826)
18. Lędziny (16,776)
19. Ustroń (16,073)
20. Skoczów (14,385)
21. Pszów (13,896)
22. Kłobuck (12,934)
23. Wisła (11,132)
24. Blachownia (9,545)
25. Imielin (9,175)
26. Wojkowice (8,927)
27. Kalety (8,607)
28. Poręba (8,525)
29. Miasteczko Śląskie (7,437)
30. Sławków (7,017)
31. Łazy (6,811)
32. Koniecpol (5,910)
33. Szczyrk (5,734)
34. Siewierz (5,581)
35. Kuźnia Raciborska (5,359)
36. Żarki (4,556)
37. Krzepice (4,456)
38. Woźniki (4,305)
39. Ogrodzieniec (4,282)
40. Strumień (3,718)
41. Szczekociny (3,612)
42. Toszek (3,600)
43. Wilamowice (3,100)
44. Olsztyn
45. Koziegłowy (2,245)
46. Krzanowice (2,157)
47. Pilica (1,936)
48. Sośnicowice (1,919)
49. Przyrów
50. Włodowice
51. Janów

== Economy ==
The gross domestic product (GDP) of the province was 61 billion € in 2018, accounting for 12.3% of the Polish economic output. GDP per capita adjusted for purchasing power was 22,200 € or 74% of the EU27 average in the same year. The GDP per employee was 83% of the EU average. Silesia Voivodeship is the province with the fourth-highest GDP per capita in Poland.

The Silesian voivodeship is predominantly an industrial region. Most of the mining is derived from one of the world's largest bituminous coalfields of the Upper Silesian Industrial District (Górnośląski Okręg Przemysłowy) and the Rybnik Coal District (Rybnicki Okręg Węglowy) with its major cities Rybnik, Jastrzębie-Zdrój, Żory and Wodzisław Śląski. Lead and zinc can be found near Bytom, Zawiercie and Tarnowskie Góry; iron ore and raw materials for building – near Częstochowa. The most important regional industries are: mining, iron, lead, and zinc metallurgy, power industry, engineering, automobile, chemical, building materials, and textile. In the past, the Silesian economy was determined by coal mining. Now, considering the investment volume, car manufacturing is becoming more and more important. The most profitable company in the region is Fiat Auto-Poland S.A. in Bielsko-Biała with a revenue of PLN 6.2 billion in 1997. Recently a new car factory has been opened by GM Opel in Gliwice. There are two Special Economic Zones in the area: Katowice and Częstochowa. The voivodeship's economy consists of about 323,000, mostly small and medium-sized enterprises, employing over 3 million people. The biggest Polish steelworks, "Huta Katowice", is situated in Dąbrowa Górnicza.

The unemployment rate stood at 3.9% in 2017 and was lower than the national average.

Year	2006	2007	2008	2009	2010	2011	2012	2013	2014	2015	2016	2017
Unemployment rate (in %)	14.2	8.1	6.6	6.7	9.2	9.2	9.4	9.7	8.6	7.2	5.4	3.9

== Transport ==
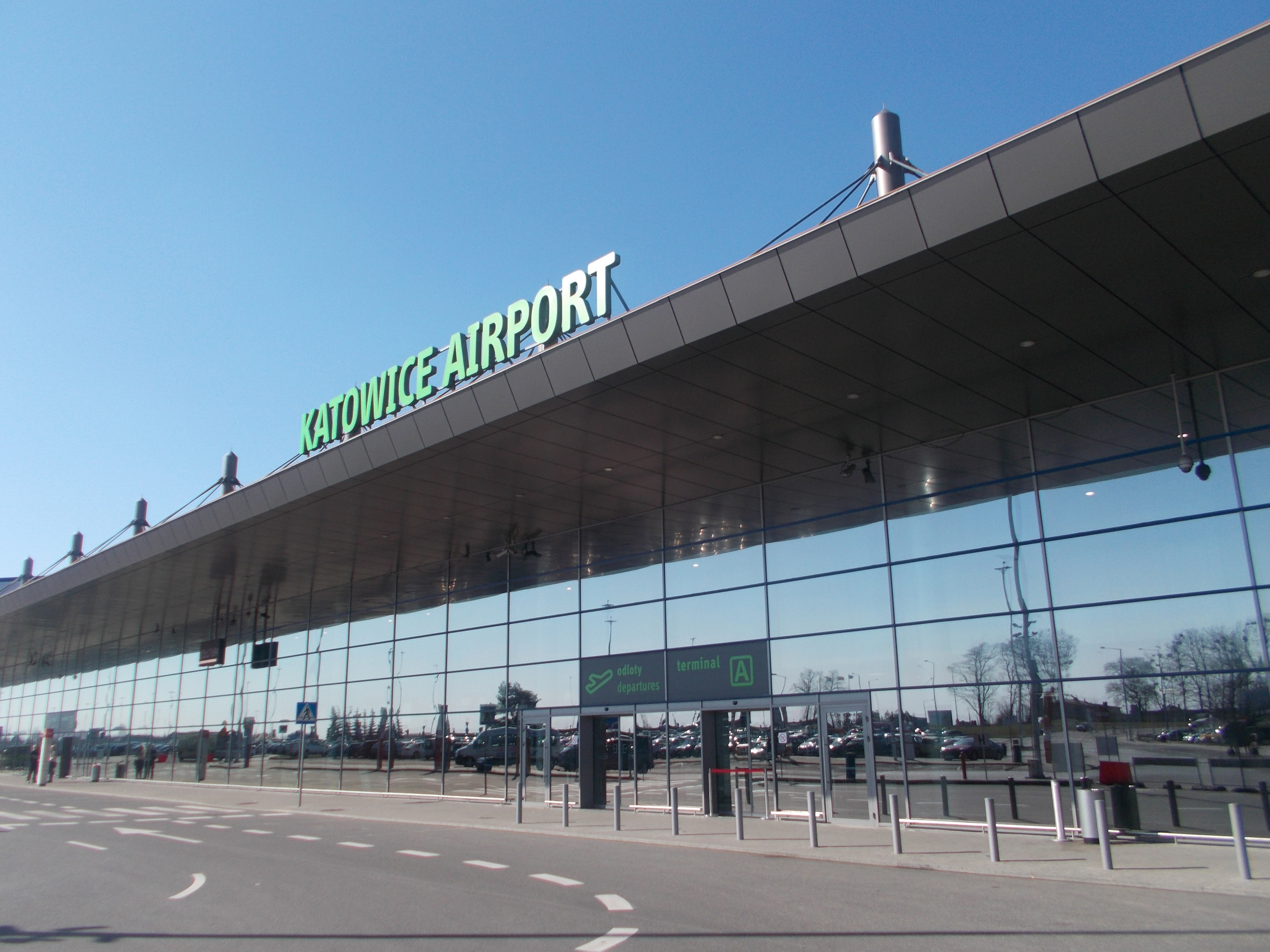
Terminal A at Katowice International Airport

Katowice International Airport (in Tarnowskie Góry County) is used for domestic and international flights, with the other nearby airports being John Paul II International Airport Kraków-Balice. The Silesian agglomeration railway network has the largest concentration in the country.

The voivodship capital enjoys good railway and road connections with Gdańsk (motorway A1) and Ostrava (motorway A1), Kraków (motorway A4), Wrocław (motorway A4), Łódź (motorway A1) and Warsaw. It is also the crossing point for many international routes like E40 connecting Calais, Brussels, Cologne, Dresden, Wrocław, Kraków and Kyiv and E75 from Scandinavia to the Balkans. A relatively short distance to Vienna facilitates cross-border co-operation and may positively influence the process of European integration.

Linia Hutnicza Szerokotorowa (known by its acronym LHS, English: Broad gauge metallurgy line) in Sławków is the longest broad gauge railway line in Poland. The line runs on a single track for almost 400 km from the Polish-Ukrainian border, crossing it just east of Hrubieszów. It is the westernmost broad-gauge railway line in Europe that is connected to the broad-gauge rail system of the countries of the former Soviet Union.

A large part of the Upper Silesia conurbation features the Silesian Interurbans, the longest tram network in Poland, and one of the largest in the world. Bus and tram transport in and around Katowice and surrounding cities has been managed by the Metropolitan Transport Authority (ZTM) since 2019.

== Education ==
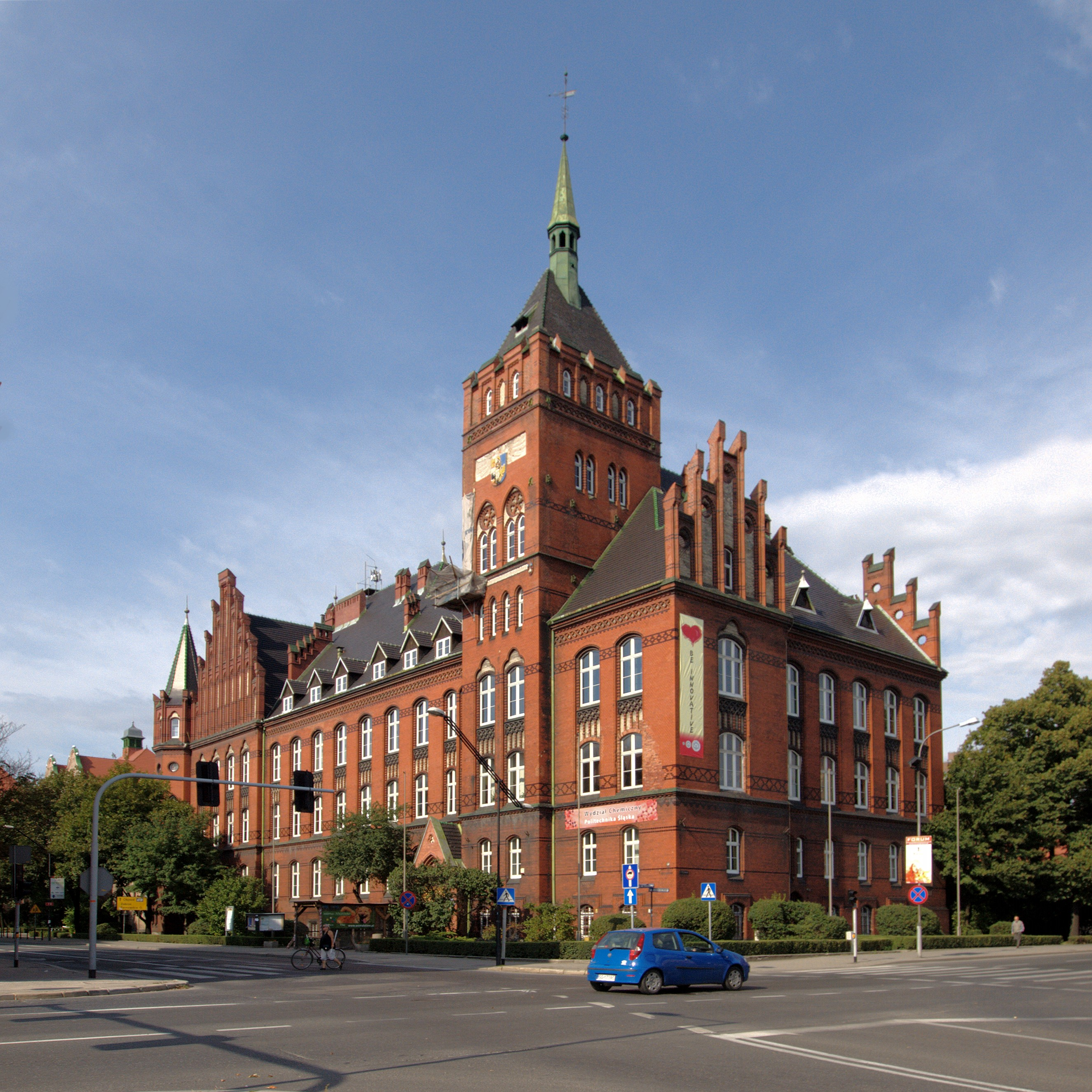
Silesian University of Technology in Gliwice, Faculty of Chemistry

There are eleven public universities in the voivodeship. The biggest university is the University of Silesia in Katowice, with 19,142 students (as of 31 December 2024). The region's capital boasts the Medical University of Silesia, the Karol Adamiecki University of Economics in Katowice, the University of Music in Katowice, the Physical Education Academy, and the Academy of Fine Arts. Częstochowa is the seat of the Częstochowa University of Technology and Pedagogic University. The Silesian University of Technology in Gliwice is nationally renowned. Bielsko-Biała is home of the Technical-Humanistic Academy. In addition, 17 new private higher education schools have been established in the region.

There are over 300,000 people currently studying in the Voivodeship. The biggest universities (for day 31.12.2023 r.) are:

1. University of Silesia in Katowice (18 306 students),
2. Silesian University of Technology in Gliwice (15 790 students),
3. WSB University in Dąbrowa Górnicza (11 430 students),
4. Medical University of Silesia (10 203 students),
5. University of Economics in Katowice (8 077 students),
6. Jan Długosz University in Częstochowa (5 631 students).
7. Częstochowa University of Technology (5 430 students),
8. University of Bielsko-Biała (4 167 students),

== Politics ==
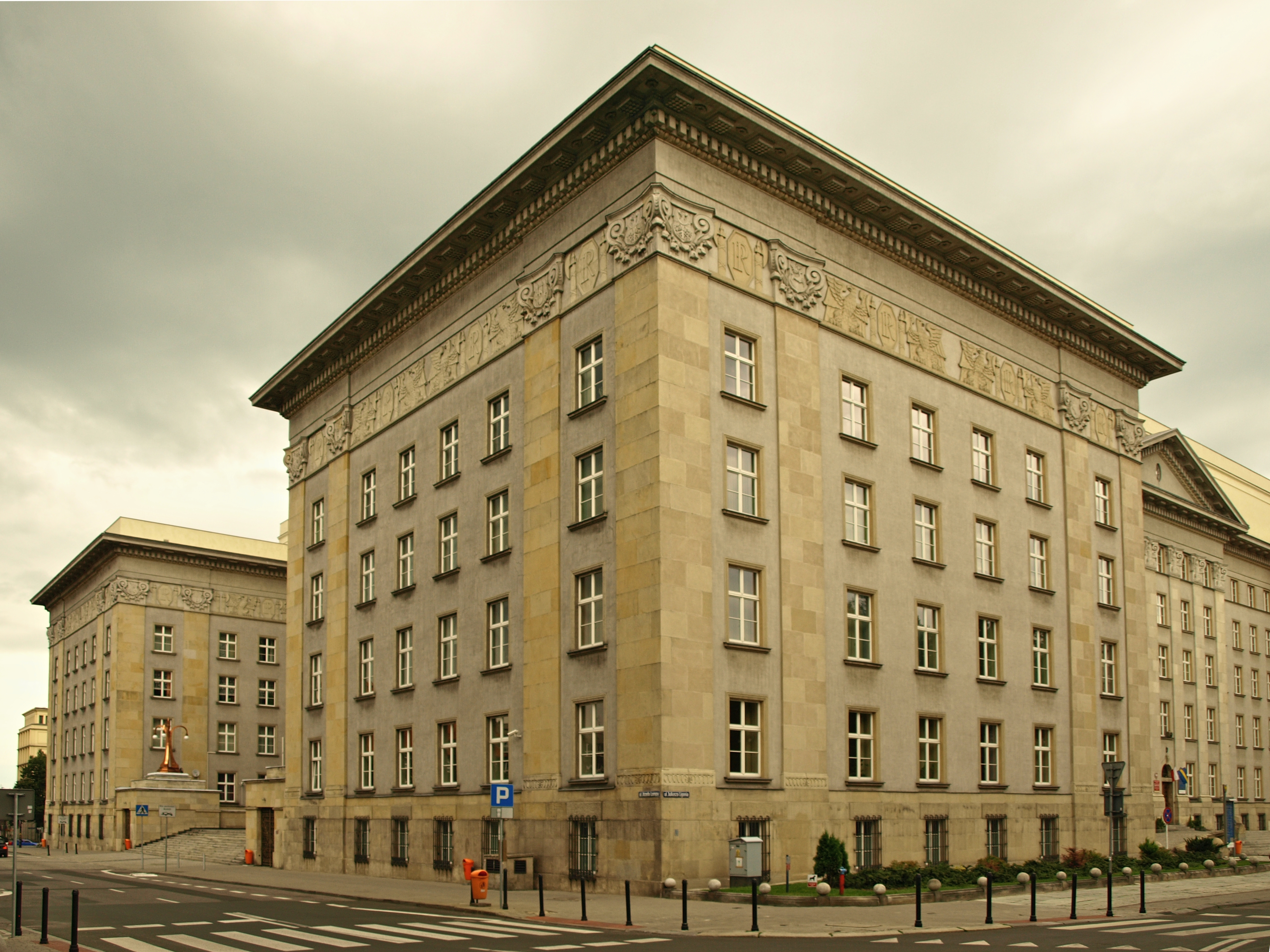
Silesian Regional Assembly

The Silesian voivodeship's government is headed by the province's voivode (governor) who is appointed by the Polish Prime Minister. The voivode is then assisted in performing his duties by the voivodeship's marshal, who is the appointed speaker for the voivodeship's executive and is elected by the sejmik (provincial assembly). The current voivode of Silesia is Jarosław Wieczorek, whilst the present marshal is Wojciech Saługa.

The Sejmik of Silesia consists of 48 members.

=== 2024 election ===
Political groups	Mandates
Koalicja Obywatelska	20
Prawo i Sprawiedliwość	18
Trzecia Droga	5
Lewica	2
Total	45

== Administrative divisions ==
Silesian Voivodeship is divided into 36 counties (powiats). These include 19 city counties (far more than any other voivodeship) and 17 land counties. The counties are further divided into 167 gminas.

The counties are listed in the following table (ordering within categories is by decreasing population).

English and Polish names	Area (km^{2})	Population (2019)	Seat	Other towns	Total gminas
City counties
Katowice	165	293,636			1
Częstochowa	160	221,252			1
Sosnowiec	91	201,121			1
Gliwice	134	179,154			1
Zabrze	80	172,806			1
Bielsko-Biała	125	170,953			1
Bytom	69	165,975			1
Rybnik	148	138,319			1
Ruda Śląska	78	137,624			1
Tychy	82	127,664			1
Dąbrowa Górnicza	188	119,800			1
Chorzów	33	107,963			1
Jaworzno	154	91,263			1
Jastrzębie-Zdrój	85	88,808			1
Mysłowice	66	74,515			1
Siemianowice Śląskie	25	66,963			1
Żory	65	62,462			1
Piekary Śląskie	40	55,088			1
Świętochłowice	13	49,762			1
Land counties
Cieszyn County powiat cieszyński	730	178,145	Cieszyn	Ustroń, Skoczów, Wisła, Strumień	12
Bielsko County powiat bielski	457	165,374	Bielsko-Biała*	Czechowice-Dziedzice, Szczyrk, Wilamowice	10
Wodzisław County powiat wodzisławski	287	157,346	Wodzisław Śląski	Rydułtowy, Radlin, Pszów	9
Żywiec County powiat żywiecki	1,040	152,877	Żywiec		15
Będzin County powiat będziński	368	148,516	Będzin	Czeladź, Wojkowice, Sławków, Siewierz	8
Tarnowskie Góry County powiat tarnogórski	643	140,022	Tarnowskie Góry	Radzionków, Kalety, Miasteczko Śląskie	9
Częstochowa County powiat częstochowski	1,519	134,637	Częstochowa*	Blachownia, Koniecpol, Olsztyn, Przyrów, Janów	16
Zawiercie County powiat zawierciański	1,003	118,020	Zawiercie	Poręba, Łazy, Ogrodzieniec, Szczekociny, Pilica, Włodowice	10
Gliwice County powiat gliwicki	663	115,571	Gliwice*	Knurów, Pyskowice, Toszek, Sośnicowice	8
Pszczyna County powiat pszczyński	473	111,324	Pszczyna		6
Racibórz County powiat raciborski	544	108,388	Racibórz	Kuźnia Raciborska, Krzanowice	8
Mikołów County powiat mikołowski	232	98,689	Mikołów	Łaziska Górne, Orzesze	5
Kłobuck County powiat kłobucki	889	84,762	Kłobuck	Krzepice	9
Rybnik County powiat rybnicki	225	78,148	Rybnik*	Czerwionka-Leszczyny	5
Lubliniec County powiat lubliniecki	822	76,470	Lubliniec	Woźniki	8
Myszków County powiat myszkowski	479	70,959	Myszków	Żarki, Koziegłowy	5
Bieruń-Lędziny County powiat bieruńsko-lędziński	157	59,715	Bieruń	Lędziny, Imielin	5
* seat not part of the county

== Protected areas ==
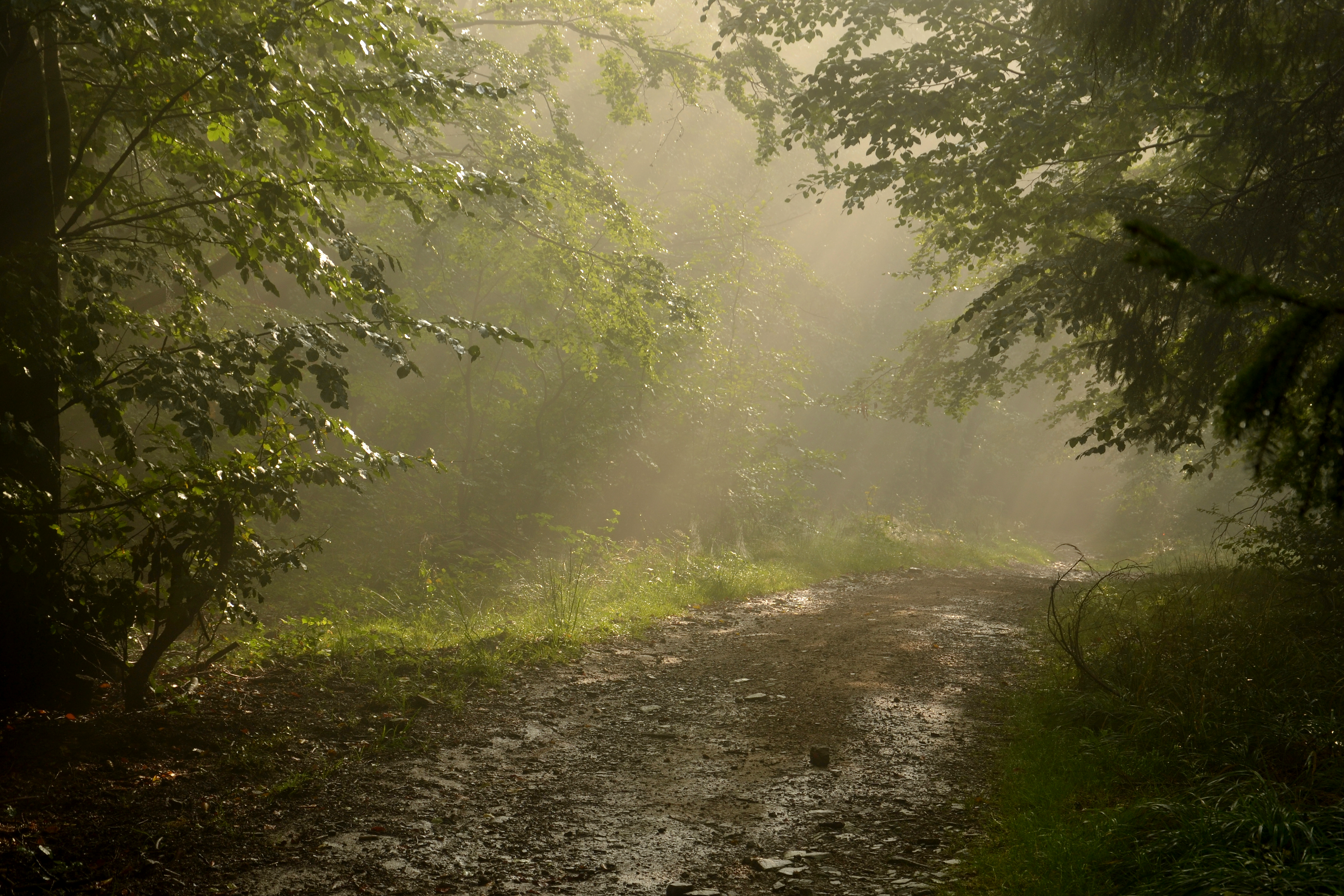
Little Beskids Landscape Park

Protected areas in Silesian Voivodeship include eight areas designated as Landscape Parks:

- Eagle Nests Landscape Park (partly in Lesser Poland Voivodeship)
- Little Beskids Landscape Park (partly in Lesser Poland Voivodeship)
- Rudy Landscape Park
- Silesian Beskids Landscape Park
- Stawki Landscape Park
- Upper Liswarta Forests Landscape Park
- Załęcze Landscape Park (partly in Łódź Voivodeship)
- Żywiec Landscape Park

== Sports ==
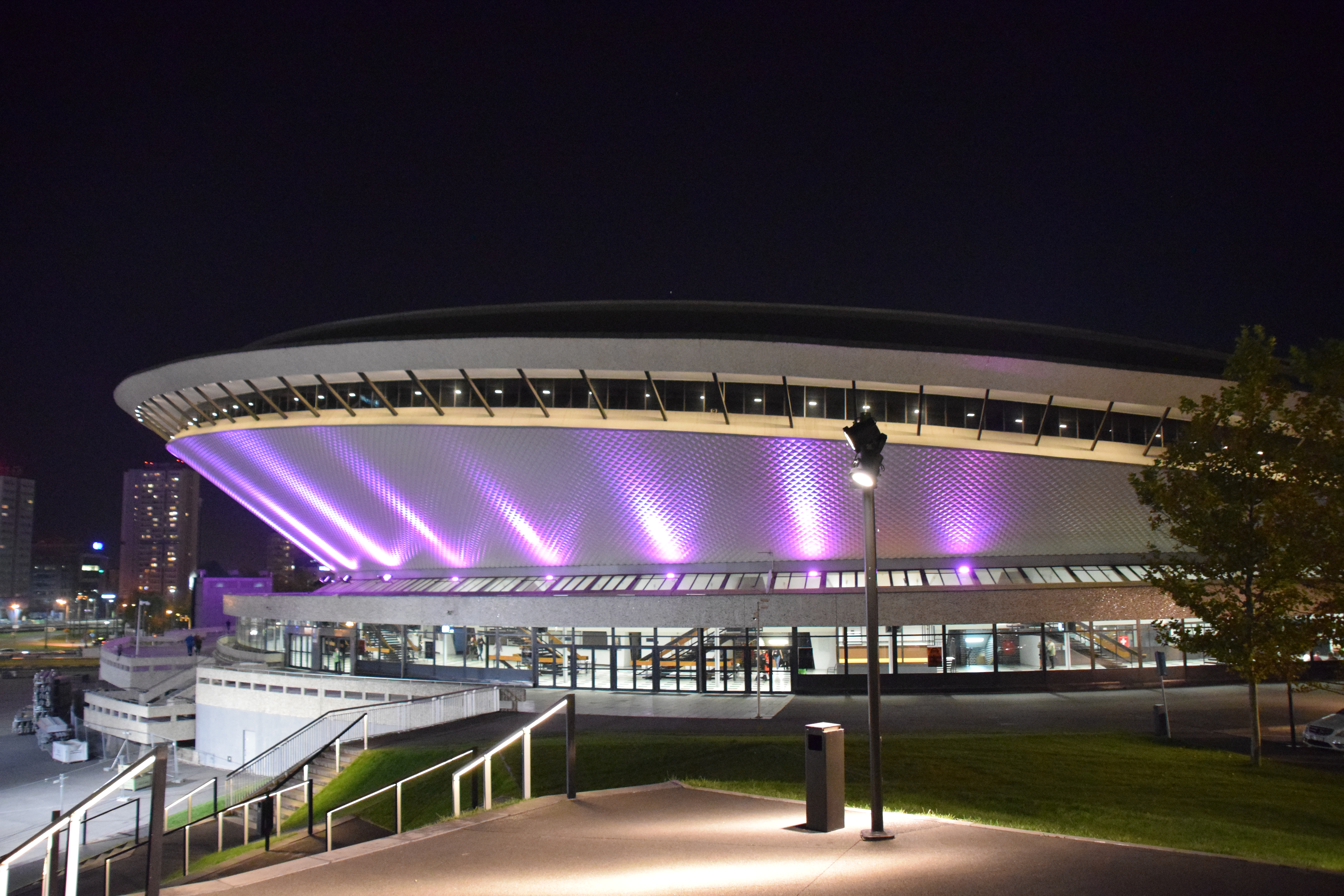
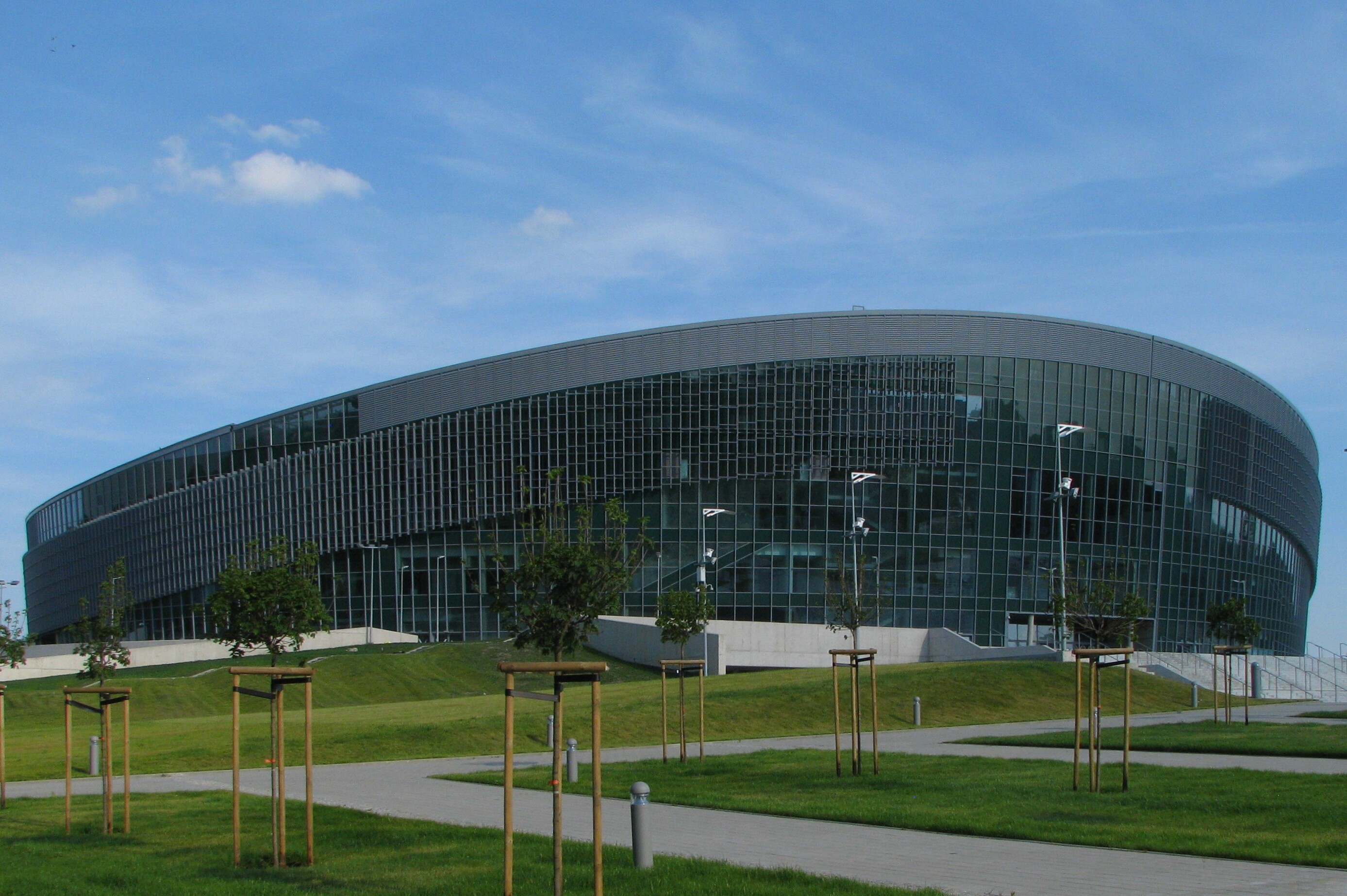
Spodek in Katowice and Gliwice Arena in Gliwice, the largest indoor arenas in the voivodeship
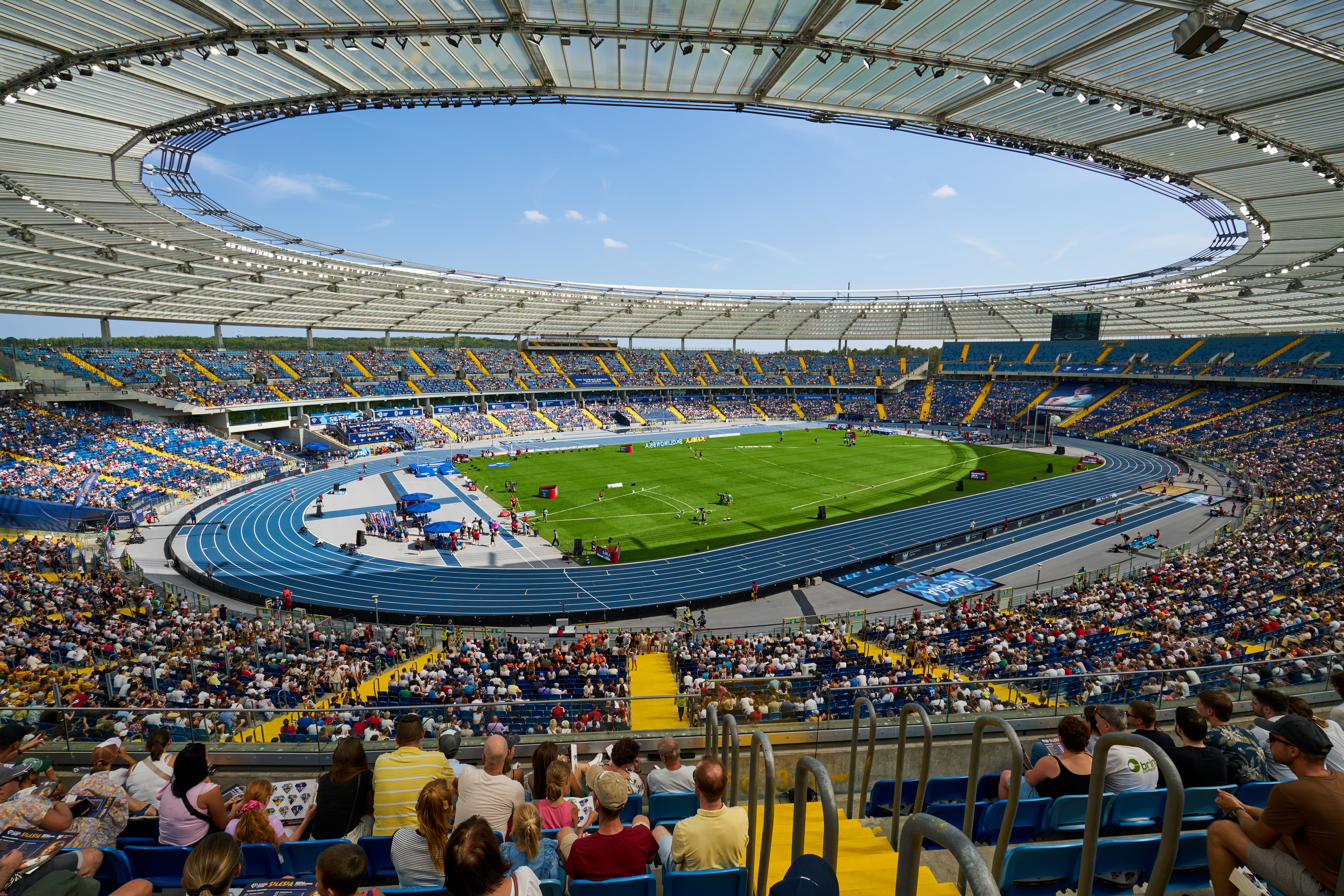
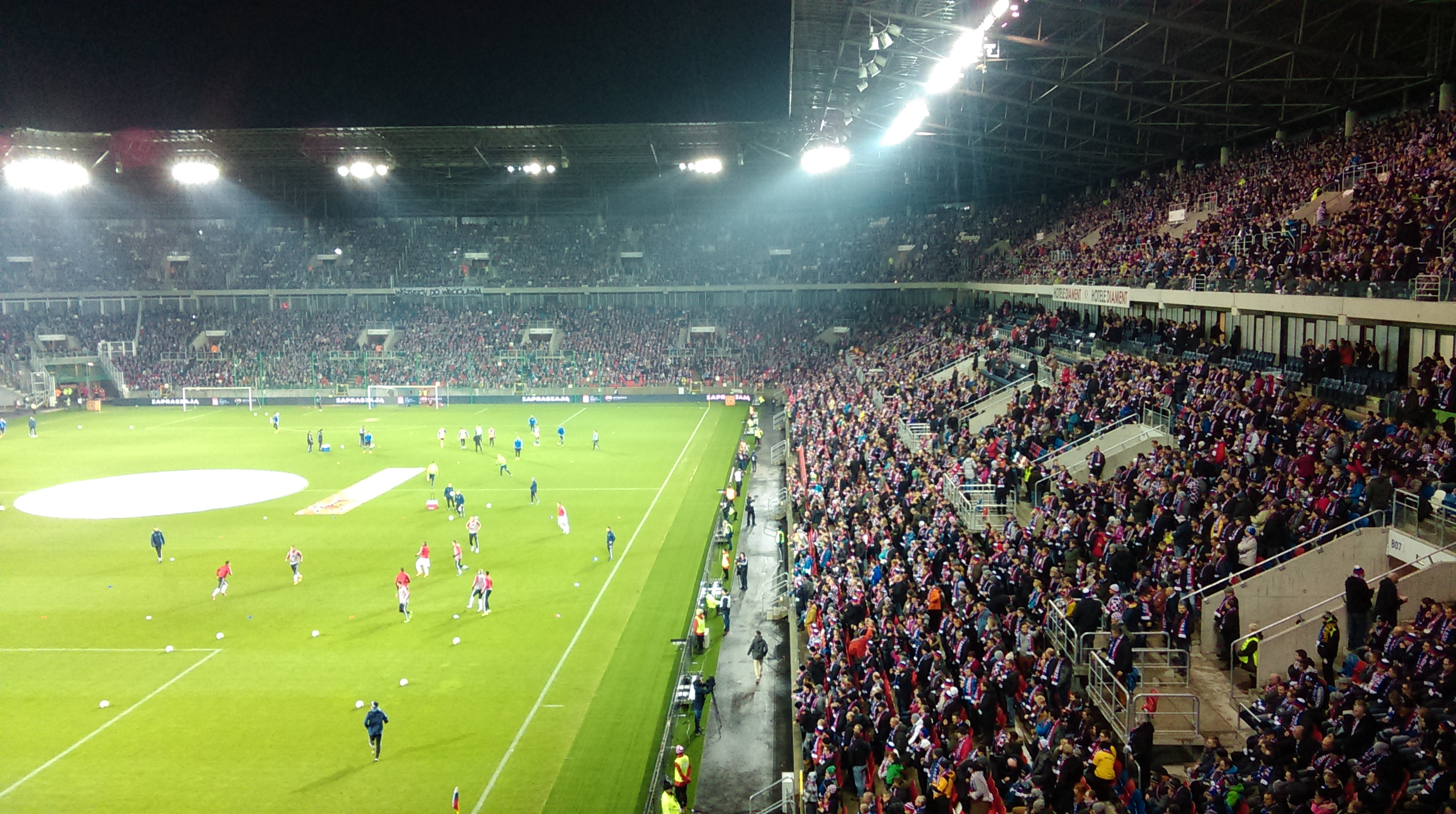
Silesian Stadium in Chorzów and Arena Zabrze in Zabrze, the largest stadiums in the voivodeship

Football, motorcycle speedway, handball, ice hockey, and volleyball enjoy the largest following in the voivodeship, with several successful teams. Most accomplished clubs include men's football clubs Górnik Zabrze and Ruch Chorzów, women's football club Czarni Sosnowiec, speedway team KS ROW Rybnik, ice hockey team GKS Katowice, men's volleyball team Jastrzębski Węgiel and women's volleyball team BKS Bielsko-Biała.

Professional sports teams
Club	Sport	League	Trophies
Górnik Zabrze	Football (men's)	Ekstraklasa	14 Polish Championships; 6 Polish Cups
Raków Częstochowa	Football (men's)	Ekstraklasa	1 Polish Championship (2023); 2 Polish Cups (2021, 2022)
GKS Katowice	Football (men's)	Ekstraklasa	3 Polish Cups (1986, 1991, 1993)
Piast Gliwice	Football (men's)	Ekstraklasa	1 Polish Championship (2019)
Ruch Chorzów	Football (men's)	I liga	14 Polish Championships; 3 Polish Cups (1951, 1974, 1996)
GKS Tychy	Football (men's)	I liga	0
Polonia Bytom	Football (men's)	I liga	2 Polish Championships (1954, 1962)
Zagłębie Sosnowiec	Football (men's)	II liga	4 Polish Cups
Podbeskidzie Bielsko-Biała	Football (men's)	II liga	0
Rekord Bielsko-Biała	Football (men's)	II liga	0
GKS Jastrzębie	Football (men's)	II liga	0
Czarni Sosnowiec	Football (women's)	Ekstraliga	13 Polish Championships; 14 Polish Cups
GKS Katowice	Football (women's)	Ekstraliga	2 Polish Championships (2023, 2025)
GKS Tychy	Ice hockey	Polska Hokej Liga	6 Polish Championships; 11 Polish Cups
GKS Katowice	Ice hockey	Polska Hokej Liga	8 Polish Championships; 1 Polish Cup (1970)
KH Zagłębie Sosnowiec	Ice hockey	Polska Hokej Liga	5 Polish Championships
JKH GKS Jastrzębie	Ice hockey	Polska Hokej Liga	1 Polish Championship (2021); 4 Polish Cups
Jastrzębski Węgiel	Volleyball (men's)	PlusLiga	4 Polish Championships; 2 Polish Cups (2010, 2025)
Warta Zawiercie	Volleyball (men's)	PlusLiga	1 Polish Cup (2024)
KS Norwid Częstochowa	Volleyball (men's)	PlusLiga	0
GKS Katowice	Volleyball (men's)	I liga	0
MKS Będzin	Volleyball (men's)	I liga	0
BBTS Bielsko-Biała	Volleyball (men's)	I liga	1 Polish Cup (1994)
BKS Bielsko-Biała	Volleyball (women's)	Tauron Liga	8 Polish Championships; 8 Polish Cups
Włókniarz Częstochowa	Speedway	Ekstraliga	4 Polish Championships
KS ROW Rybnik	Speedway	Ekstraliga	12 Polish Championships
Górnik Zabrze	Handball (men's)	Polish Superliga	2 Polish Championships (1989, 1990); 3 Polish Cups (1984, 1988, 1990)
Ruch Chorzów	Handball (women's)	Superliga	9 Polish Championships; 5 Polish Cups
GTK Gliwice	Basketball (men's)	Polish Basketball League	0
MKS Dąbrowa Górnicza	Basketball (men's)	Polish Basketball League	0
Zagłębie Sosnowiec	Basketball (women's)	Basket Liga Kobiet	0

Since the establishment of the province, several major international sports competitions were co-hosted by the province, including the EuroBasket 2009, 2014 FIVB Men's Volleyball World Championship, 2016 European Men's Handball Championship, 2017 Men's European Volleyball Championship, 2018 FIVB Volleyball Men's Club World Championship, 2019 FIFA U-20 World Cup, 2021 Men's European Volleyball Championship, 2023 World Men's Handball Championship.

== Curiosities ==
- Bytom, Cieszyn, Racibórz and Siewierz are former medieval ducal seats of the Piast dynasty.
- One of the three parish churches of the Armenian Catholic Church in Poland is located in Gliwice (see also: Armenians in Poland).

== See also ==
- History of Silesia
- Silesian Uprisings
