= List of Landscape Parks of Poland =

Leading Landscape Parks of Poland
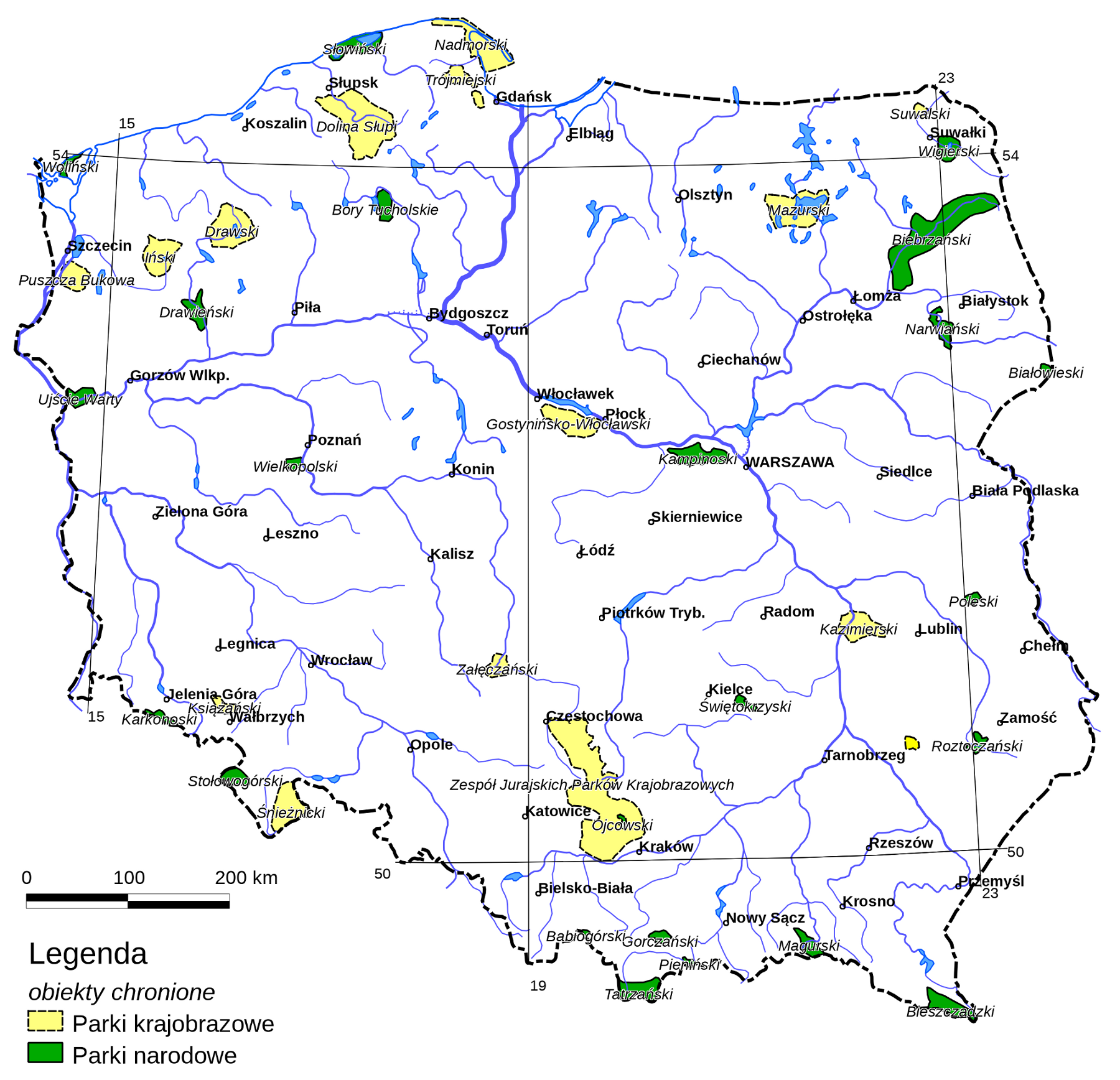
Map of selected large-scale landscape parks in Poland marked in yellow (green, are the national parks).

According to the Act on Protection of Nature (Ustawa o ochronie przyrody) of 2004, a Landscape Park (Parki Krajobrazowe) is defined as "an area protected because of its natural, historical, cultural and scenic values, for the purpose of conserving and popularizing those values in conditions of balanced development."

Decisions on the creation, liquidation and boundaries of Landscape Parks are taken by resolution of the provincial assembly (voivodeship sejmik). A decision to create a Landscape Park must be preceded by consultation with the council of any relevant gmina and with the Regional Director of Nature Protection. A buffer zone (otulina) may be designated in addition to the area of the Park itself.

There are 123 designated Landscape Parks throughout Poland, covering a total area of approximately 25,000 square kilometres (10,000 sq mi). They are listed here with their English and Polish names and with the names of the voivodeships in which they are situated.

Park	Local name	Regions
Barlinek-Gorzów Landscape Park	(Barlinecko-Gorzowski Park Krajobrazowy)	Lubusz, West Pomeranian
Barycz Valley Landscape Park	(Park Krajobrazowy Dolina Baryczy)	Greater Poland, Lower Silesian
Bielany-Tyniec Landscape Park	(Bielańsko-Tyniecki Park Krajobrazowy)	Lesser Poland
Bóbr Valley Landscape Park	(Park Krajobrazowy Doliny Bobru)	Lower Silesian
Bolimów Landscape Park	(Bolimowski Park Krajobrazowy)	Łódź, Masovian
Brodnica Landscape Park	(Brodnicki Park Krajobrazowy)	Kuyavian-Pomeranian, Warmian-Masurian
Brudzeń Landscape Park	(Brudzeński Park Krajobrazowy)	Masovian
Bug Landscape Park	(Nadbużański Park Krajobrazowy)	Masovian
Bystrzyca Valley Landscape Park	(Park Krajobrazowy Dolina Bystrzycy)	Lower Silesian
Cedynia Landscape Park	(Cedyński Park Krajobrazowy)	West Pomeranian
Chęciny-Kielce Landscape Park	(Chęcińsko-Kielecki Park Krajobrazowy)	Świętokrzyskie
Chełm Landscape Park	(Chełmski Park Krajobrazowy)	Lublin
Chełmno Landscape Park	(Chełmiński Park Krajobrazowy)	Kuyavian-Pomeranian
Chełmy Landscape Park	(Park Krajobrazowy Chełmy)	Lower Silesian
Chłapowski Landscape Park	(Park Krajobrazowy im. gen. Dezyderego Chłapowskiego)	Greater Poland
Chojnów Landscape Park	(Chojnowski Park Krajobrazowy)	Masovian
Ciężkowice-Rożnów Landscape Park	(Ciężkowicko-Rożnowski Park Krajobrazowy)	Lesser Poland
Cisna-Wetlina Landscape Park	(Ciśniańsko-Wetliński Park Krajobrazowy)	Subcarpathian
Cisów-Orłowiny Landscape Park	(Cisowsko-Orłowiński Park Krajobrazowy)	Świętokrzyskie
Coastal Landscape Park	(Nadmorski Park Krajobrazowy)	Pomeranian
Czarnorzeki-Strzyżów Landscape Park	(Czarnorzecko-Strzyżowski Park Krajobrazowy)	Subcarpathian
Dłubnia Landscape Park	(Dłubniański Park Krajobrazowy)	Lesser Poland
Drawsko Landscape Park	(Drawski Park Krajobrazowy)	West Pomeranian
Dylewo Hills Landscape Park	(Park Krajobrazowy Wzgórz Dylewskich)	Warmian-Masurian
Eagles' Nests Landscape Park	(Park Krajobrazowy Orlich Gniazd)	Lesser Poland, Silesian
Elbląg Upland Landscape Park	(Park Krajobrazowy Wysoczyzny Elbląskiej)	Warmian-Masurian
Gopło Landscape Park (Greater Poland Voivodship)	(Park Krajobrazowy Nadgoplański Park Tysiąclecia)	Greater Poland (1)
Gopło Landscape Park (Kuyavian-Pomeranian Voivodship)	(Park Krajobrazowy Nadgoplański Park Tysiąclecia)	Kuyavian-Pomeranian (2)
Góra Świętej Anny Landscape Park	(Park Krajobrazowy Góra Świętej Anny)	Opole
Góry Łosiowe Landscape Park	(Park Krajobrazowy Góry Łosiowe)	Kuyavian-Pomeranian
Górzno-Lidzbark Landscape Park	(Górznieńsko-Lidzbarski Park Krajobrazowy)	Kuyavian-Pomeranian, Masovian, Warmian-Masurian
Gostynin-Włocławek Landscape Park	(Gostynińsko-Włocławski Park Krajobrazowy)	Kuyavian-Pomeranian, Masovian
Gryżyna Landscape Park	(Gryżyński Park Krajobrazowy)	Lubusz
Iława Lake District Landscape Park	(Park Krajobrazowy Pojezierza Iławskiego)	Pomeranian, Warmian-Masurian
Ińsko Landscape Park	(Iński Park Krajobrazowy)	West Pomeranian
Janów Forests Landscape Park	(Park Krajobrazowy Lasy Janowskie)	Lublin, Subcarpathian
Jaśliska Landscape Park	(Jaśliski Park Krajobrazowy)	Subcarpathian
Jeleniowska Landscape Park	(Jeleniowski Park Krajobrazowy)	Świętokrzyskie
Jezierzyca Valley Landscape Park	(Park Krajobrazowy Dolina Jezierzycy)	Lower Silesian
Kashubian Landscape Park	(Kaszubski Park Krajobrazowy)	Pomeranian
Kazimierz Landscape Park	(Kazimierski Park Krajobrazowy)	Lublin
Kozienice Landscape Park	(Kozienicki Park Krajobrazowy)	Masovian
Kozłówka Landscape Park	(Kozłowiecki Park Krajobrazowy)	Lublin
Kozubów Landscape Park	(Kozubowski Park Krajobrazowy)	Świętokrzyskie
Krajna Landscape Park	(Krajeński Park Krajobrazowy)	Kuyavian-Pomeranian
Kraków Valleys Landscape Park	(Park Krajobrazowy Dolinki Krakowskie)	Lesser Poland
Krasnobród Landscape Park	(Krasnobrodzki Park Krajobrazowy)	Lublin
Krzczonów Landscape Park	(Krzczonowski Park Krajobrazowy)	Lublin
Krzesin Landscape Park	(Krzesiński Park Krajobrazowy)	Lubusz
Książ Landscape Park	(Książański Park Krajobrazowy)	Lower Silesian
Łagów Landscape Park	(Łagowski Park Krajobrazowy)	Lubusz
Łęczna Lake District Landscape Park	(Park Krajobrazowy Pojezierze Łęczyńskie)	Lublin
Lednica Landscape Park	(Lednicki Park Krajobrazowy)	Greater Poland
Little Beskids Landscape Park	(Park Krajobrazowy Beskidu Małego)	Lesser Poland, Silesian
Łódź Hills Landscape Park	(Park Krajobrazowy Wzniesień Łódzkich)	Łódź
Łomża Landscape Park	(Łomżyński Park Krajobrazowy Doliny Narwi)	Podlaskie
Lower Odra Valley Landscape Park	(Park Krajobrazowy Dolina Dolnej Odry)	West Pomeranian
Masovian Landscape Park	(Mazowiecki Park Krajobrazowy)	Masovian
Masurian Landscape Park	(Mazurski Park Krajobrazowy)	Warmian-Masurian
Muskau Bend Landscape Park	(Park Krajobrazowy Łuk Mużakowa)	Lubusz
Nida Landscape Park	(Nadnidziański Park Krajobrazowy)	Świętokrzyskie
Opawskie Mountains Landscape Park	(Park Krajobrazowy Gór Opawskich)	Opole
Owl Mountains Landscape Park	(Park Krajobrazowy Gór Sowich)	Lower Silesian
Pasmo Brzanki Landscape Park	(Park Krajobrazowy Pasma Brzanki)	Lesser Poland, Subcarpathian
Podlasie Bug Gorge Landscape Park	(Park Krajobrazowy Podlaski Przełom Bugu)	Lublin, Masovian
Pogórze Przemyskie Landscape Park	(Park Krajobrazowy Pogórza Przemyskiego)	Subcarpathian
Polesie Landscape Park	(Poleski Park Krajobrazowy)	Lublin
Poprad Landscape Park	(Popradzki Park Krajobrazowy)	Lesser Poland
Powidz Landscape Park	(Powidzki Park Krajobrazowy)	Greater Poland
Promno Landscape Park	(Park Krajobrazowy Promno)	Greater Poland
Przedbórz Landscape Park	(Przedborski Park Krajobrazowy)	Łódź, Świętokrzyskie
Przemęt Landscape Park	(Przemęcki Park Krajobrazowy)	Greater Poland, Lubusz
Przemków Landscape Park	(Przemkowski Park Krajobrazowy)	Lower Silesian
Pszczew Landscape Park	(Pszczewski Park Krajobrazowy)	Greater Poland, Lubusz
Knyszyń Forest Landscape Park	(Park Krajobrazowy Puszczy Knyszyńskiej)	Podlaskie
Puszcza Romincka Landscape Park	(Park Krajobrazowy Puszczy Rominckiej)	Warmian-Masurian
Puszcza Solska Landscape Park	(Park Krajobrazowy Puszczy Solskiej)	Lublin, Subcarpathian
Puszcza Zielonka Landscape Park	(Park Krajobrazowy Puszcza Zielonka)	Greater Poland
Rogalin Landscape Park	(Rogaliński Park Krajobrazowy)	Greater Poland
Rudawy Landscape Park	(Rudawski Park Krajobrazowy)	Lower Silesian
Rudno Landscape Park	(Rudniański Park Krajobrazowy)	Lesser Poland
Rudy Landscape Park	(Park Krajobrazowy Cysterskie Kompozycje Krajobrazowe Rud Wielkich)	Silesian
San Valley Landscape Park	(Park Krajobrazowy Doliny Sanu)	Subcarpathian
Sieradowice Landscape Park	(Sieradowicki Park Krajobrazowy)	Świętokrzyskie
Sieraków Landscape Park	(Sierakowski Park Krajobrazowy)	Greater Poland
Silesian Beskids Landscape Park	(Park Krajobrazowy Beskidu Śląskiego)	Silesian
Skierbieszów Landscape Park	(Skierbieszowski Park Krajobrazowy)	Lublin
Ślęża Landscape Park	(Ślężański Park Krajobrazowy)	Lower Silesian
Słonne Mountains Landscape Park	(Park Krajobrazowy Gór Słonnych)	Subcarpathian
Słupia Valley Landscape Park	(Park Krajobrazowy Dolina Słupi)	Pomeranian
Śnieżnik Landscape Park	(Śnieżnicki Park Krajobrazowy)	Lower Silesian
Sobibór Landscape Park	(Sobiborski Park Krajobrazowy)	Lublin
South Roztocze Landscape Park	(Południoworoztoczański Park Krajobrazowy)	Lublin, Subcarpathian
Spała Landscape Park	(Spalski Park Krajobrazowy)	Łódź
Stawki Landscape Park	(Park Krajobrazowy Stawki)	Silesian
Stobrawa Landscape Park	(Stobrawski Park Krajobrazowy)	Opole
Strzelce Landscape Park	(Strzelecki Park Krajobrazowy)	Lublin
Suchedniów-Oblęgorek Landscape Park	(Suchedniowsko-Oblęgorski Park Krajobrazowy)	Świętokrzyskie
Sudety Wałbrzyskie Landscape Park	(Park Krajobrazowy Sudetów Wałbrzyskich)	Lower Silesian
Sulejów Landscape Park	(Sulejowski Park Krajobrazowy)	Łódź
Suwałki Landscape Park	(Suwalski Park Krajobrazowy)	Podlaskie
Szaniec Landscape Park	(Szaniecki Park Krajobrazowy)	Świętokrzyskie
Szczebrzeszyn Landscape Park	(Szczebrzeszyński Park Krajobrazowy)	Lublin
Szczecin Landscape Park	(Szczeciński Park Krajobrazowy "Puszcza Bukowa")	West Pomeranian
Tenczynek Landscape Park	(Tenczyński Park Krajobrazowy)	Lesser Poland
Tricity Landscape Park	(Trójmiejski Park Krajobrazowy)	Pomeranian
Tuchola Landscape Park	(Tucholski Park Krajobrazowy)	Kuyavian-Pomeranian, Pomeranian
Ujście Warty Landscape Park	(Park Krajobrazowy Ujście Warty)	West Pomeranian
Upper Liswarta Forests Landscape Park	(Park Krajobrazowy Lasy nad Górną Liswartą)	Silesian
Vistula Landscape Park	(Nadwiślański Park Krajobrazowy)	Kuyavian-Pomeranian
Vistula Spit Landscape Park	(Park Krajobrazowy Mierzeja Wiślana)	Pomeranian
Warta Landscape Park	(Nadwarciański Park Krajobrazowy)	Greater Poland
Warta-Widawka Landscape Park	(Park Krajobrazowy Międzyrzecza Warty i Widawki)	Łódź
Wda Landscape Park	(Wdecki Park Krajobrazowy)	Kuyavian-Pomeranian
Wdzydze Landscape Park	(Wdzydzki Park Krajobrazowy)	Pomeranian
Wel Landscape Park	(Welski Park Krajobrazowy)	Warmian-Masurian
Wieprz Landscape Park	(Nadwieprzański Park Krajobrazowy)	Lublin
Wiśnicz-Lipnica Landscape Park	(Wiśnicko-Lipnicki Park Krajobrazowy)	Lesser Poland
Wrzelowiec Landscape Park	(Wrzelowiecki Park Krajobrazowy)	Lublin
Zaborski Landscape Park	(Zaborski Park Krajobrazowy)	Pomeranian
Załęcze Landscape Park	(Załęczański Park Krajobrazowy)	Łódź, Opole, Silesian
Żerków-Czeszewo Landscape Park	(Żerkowsko-Czeszewski Park Krajobrazowy)	Greater Poland
Żywiec Landscape Park	(Żywiecki Park Krajobrazowy)	Silesian
