= Bug Landscape Park =

Protected area in Poland

Coordinates: 52°37′10″N 21°50′49″E

- Nadbużański Park Krajobrazowy
- IUCN category V (protected landscape/seascape)
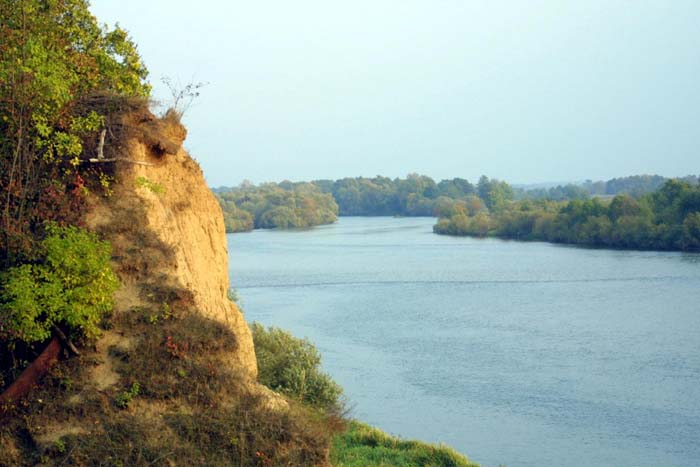
- Bug River near Nur
- Interactive map of Bug Landscape Park
- Location: Masovian Voivodeship
- Area: 741.36 km^{2} (286.24 sq mi)
- Established: 1993
- Governing body: Masovian Governor

Bug Landscape Park (Nadbużański Park Krajobrazowy) is a protected area (Landscape Park) in east-central Poland, and one of over a hundred Polish Landscape Parks. The park lies within Masovian Voivodeship, on the Bug River. It includes part of three Polish historical regions: Kurpie, Masovia and Podlasie.

The park covers an area of 741.36 square kilometres plus 395.35 square kilometres of protection zone. Within the Bug Landscape Park, fourteen nature reserves have been established with a further three planned. Included within those reserves are seven forests, three bird reserves, and two flower reserves. The name of the Bug River is derived from an old Slavic word for "wetland".

== Climate and wildlife ==
Low-intensive human activity makes the park more natural and unique. The park includes a large variety of landscapes but the two most predominant are the forest complexes, composed mainly of pine, and Bug River valley. Flora of Bug Landscape Park counts about 1,300 species, among them there are 39 species of trees and 59 of shrubs. The park contains many protected plants, such as: silene dichotoma, saxifraga tridactylites, medicago minima, Turk's cap lily, twinflower and the variety of willow known as Salix starkeana.

The valley of Bug River with its wetlands provides the habitat to many endangered birds including the black stork, the common sandpiper, the common snipe, the Eurasian curlew, the grey heron, the ruff. Migrating birds use the park for feeding and rest. The park also has 37 mammal species including beavers, moose and otters, as well as reptiles including European pond turtles, and coronella austriaca known as the smooth snake. Moreover, 12 species of amphibians and 29 species of fish can be found there.

== Tourist and biodiversity interest ==
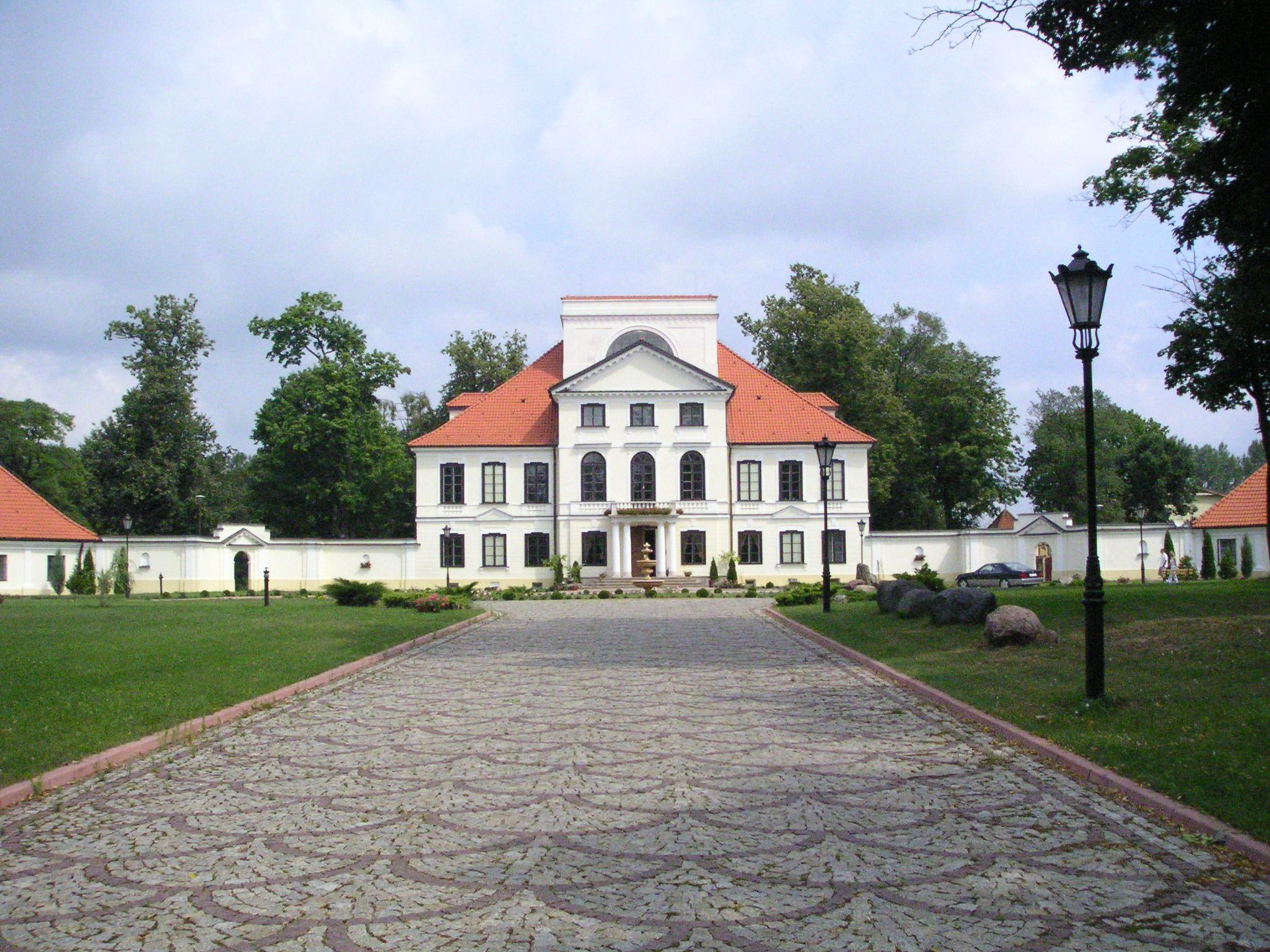
The Palace in Sterdyń

Within the park, there are 251 monuments of nature primarily trees such as ashes, limes, oaks, pines. Other monuments include a colony of ant-hills, a monadnock hill, a subterranean fungus site and a 3 km long avenue of oaks made up of 442 individual trees with diameters of up to 450 cm.

The populated areas of the park are composed mainly of villages and small cities with Sokołów Podlaski (pop. 18,000) being the largest. One of the unique characteristics of the park is the continuing presence of Polish rural culture, notably traditional folk music and sculpture. Barns and hay stacks are a typical sight in the Bug River valley, along with historic wooden architecture, roadside crucifixes, old mills and small shrines scattered throughout the many towns and villages, where local fetes are celebrated, such as the Potato Day or Bread Festivals. The park also contains some palaces and stately houses as well as smaller manor houses such as those in Korczew, Starawieś and Sterdyń. There are some large churches in the area, e.g. in Kosów Lacki and Sokołów Podlaski. The area also includes monuments of Polish and regional history such as statues, museums, and tombs. One historically significant site is the Treblinka extermination camp, where the Nazis conducted an extermination program against Jews, Gypsies, and other groups considered deviant by the Nazi party.

The park contains a large number of hiking and cycling trails, making it an attractive destination for angling and ecotourism. Canoeing and rafting are also popular.

== See also ==
- Bug River
- Protected areas of Poland

== Bibliography ==
- H. Kot, Straczewski C. (1996). Nadbużański Park Krajobrazowy = The Nadbużański Landscape Park. Wydawnictwo Poligraficzne 'Sprint'. ISBN 83-903263-2-9.
- G. Rąkowski (2004). Parki Krajobrazowe w Polsce: Nadbużański Park Krajobrazowy. Institute of Environmental Protection. ISBN 83-85805-73-7.
