= Elwira Żmudzka =

Polish climatologist

- Born: 1961 (age 64–65)
- Citizenship: Poland
- Known for: Climatologist
- Scientific career
- Institutions: University of Warsaw

Elwira Barbara Żmudzka (born 1961) is a Polish climatologist specializing in climatology and environmental protection and is the president of the Association of Polish Climatologists.

== Biography ==
Żmudzka graduated with a degree in geography in 1985 before earning her doctorate in 1999 with a thesis entitled "Cyclic Changes in Air Temperature in Poland." In 2008, she earned her postdoctoral degree.

Żmudzka works as a research and teaching fellow at the University of Warsaw in the Faculty of Geography and Regional Studies. She is the author of over one hundred scientific studies on climate change, its determinants and environmental implications, topoclimatology and environmental protection. Żmudzka has also participated in the development of plans for protected areas in Poland, including Wigry National Park, Tuchola Forest National Park, and studies of the natural environment of the Łomża Landscape Park.

She is a member of several national and international scientific societies, including the International Association for Urban Climate, the Polish Academy of Sciences, the Polish Geographical Society, the Polish Geophysical Society and the Association of Polish Climatologists, serving as its President.

In 2010, she took part in the 'Great Geography Lesson', organised as part of the Explorers Festival 2010, during which she gave a lecture on the extreme continental climate of Eastern Siberia. She has also participated in numerous research expeditions. In 2010, she was in Saharan Africa. Her favorite region is the Tatra Mountains in the Polish-Slovak border region.

== Selected publications ==
- Kożuchowski K., Żmudzka E., 2001, Assessment of relations between the normalised difference vegetation index (NDVI), frequency of forest fires, air temperature, sunshine, precipitation in Poland. „Geographia Polonica”, t. 74, nr 2, s. 29-40.
- Degirmendžić J., Kożuchowski K., Żmudzka E., 2004, Changes of Air Temperature and Precipitation in Poland in the Period 1951–2000 and their Relationship to Atmospheric Circulation. "International Journal of Climatology”, t. 24, nr 3, s. 291-310.
- Żmudzka E., 2007, Cloudiness over the north-western Poland. Quaestiones Geographicae, 26A, Adam Mickiewicz University Press, Poznań, s. 79-87.
- Żmudzka E., 2008, The influence of cloudiness on air temperature and precipitation on the territory of Poland (1951-2000). "Miscellanea Geographica”, t. 13, s. 89-103.
- Żmudzka E., 2009, Changes of thermal conditions in the Polish Tatra Mountains, "Landform Analysis”, t. 10, s. 140-146.
