= Masovian Landscape Park =

Protected area in Poland

Coordinates: 52.0769°N 21.3192°E

- Mazowiecki Park Krajobrazowy
- IUCN category V (protected landscape/seascape)
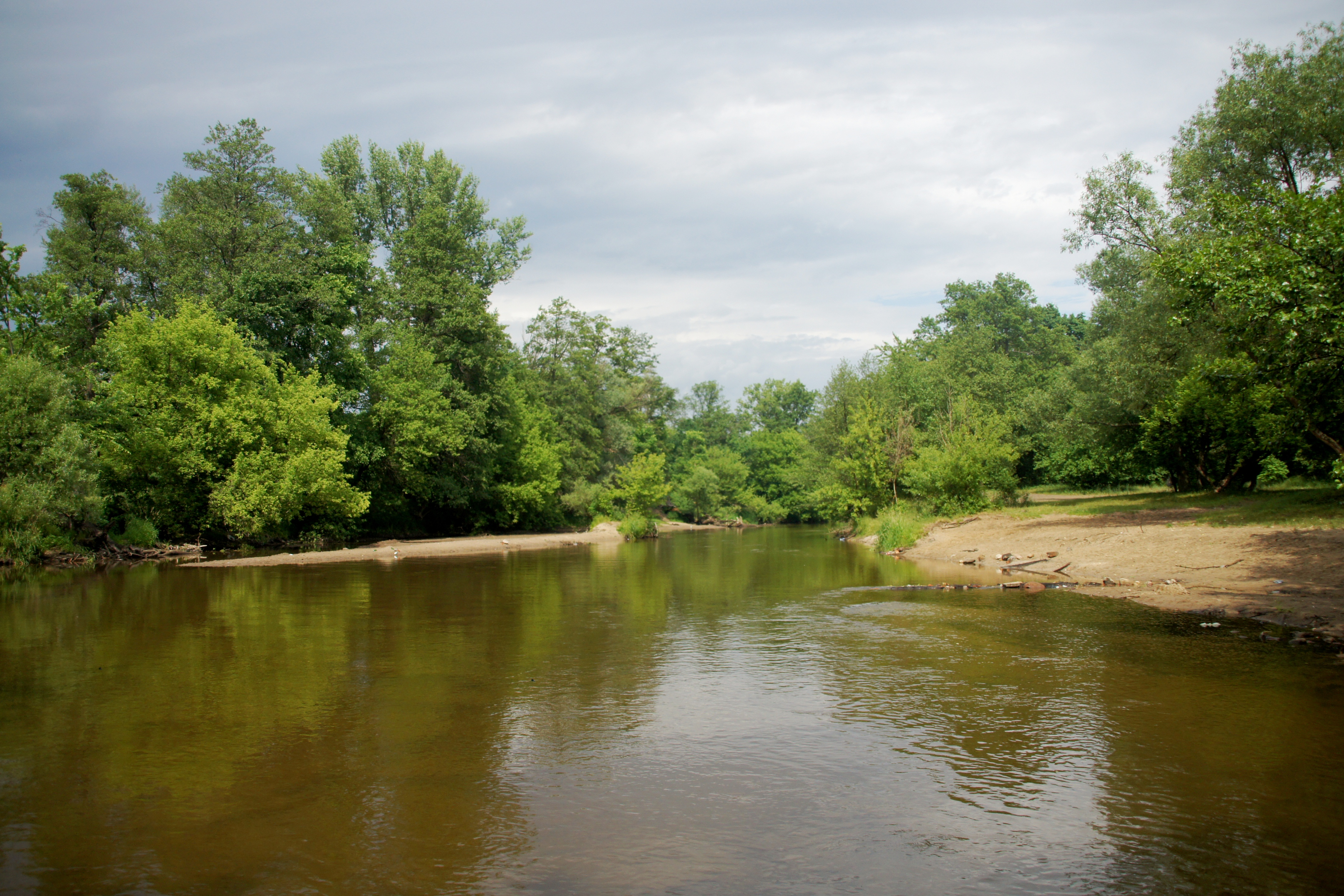
- Świder river in the Masovian Park
- Interactive map of Masovian Landscape Park
- Location: Masovian Voivodeship
- Area: 143.7 km^{2} (55.5 sq mi)
- Established: 1986

Masovian Landscape Park (Mazowiecki Park Krajobrazowy) is a protected area (Landscape Park) in east-central Poland, established in 1986, covering an area of 143.7 square kilometres (55.5 sq mi).

== Location ==
The Park lies within Masovian Voivodeship: in Garwolin County (Gmina Pilawa) and Otwock County (Gmina Celestynów, Gmina Karczew, Gmina Kołbiel, Gmina Osieck, Gmina Sobienie-Jeziory, Gmina Wiązowna).

Within the Landscape Park are nine nature reserves.

== History ==
The park was designed on the border of the then voivodeships of Siedlce and the capital of Warsaw. The author of the park design was Bolesław Król. The scientific foundation was a series of master's theses carried out at the Institute of Environmental Protection at the Warsaw University of Life Sciences under the supervision of prof. Henryk Zimny and doc. Janusz Janecki.

In June 1986, the then Provincial National Council in Siedlce decided to establish a part of the park (approx. 25% of the area) on its territory. The park became a fact with the announcement of the resolution of the National Council of the capital city of Warsaw on its establishment in the capital areas (Official Journal of the Capital City of Warsaw No. 9 of May 9, 1988). The park was established on an area of 14 370 ha (including a protection zone of 22 193 ha).

In 2001, the park was named after Czesław Łaszek, a long-term voivodeship nature conservator who has been associated with the Park for many years.

On April 16, 2004, the Masovian Voivode established a 20-year protection plan for the park.

== See also ==
- List of Landscape Parks of Poland
