= Bóbr Valley Landscape Park =

Protected landscape park in south-western Poland

- Park Krajobrazowy Doliny Bobru
- IUCN category V (protected landscape/seascape)
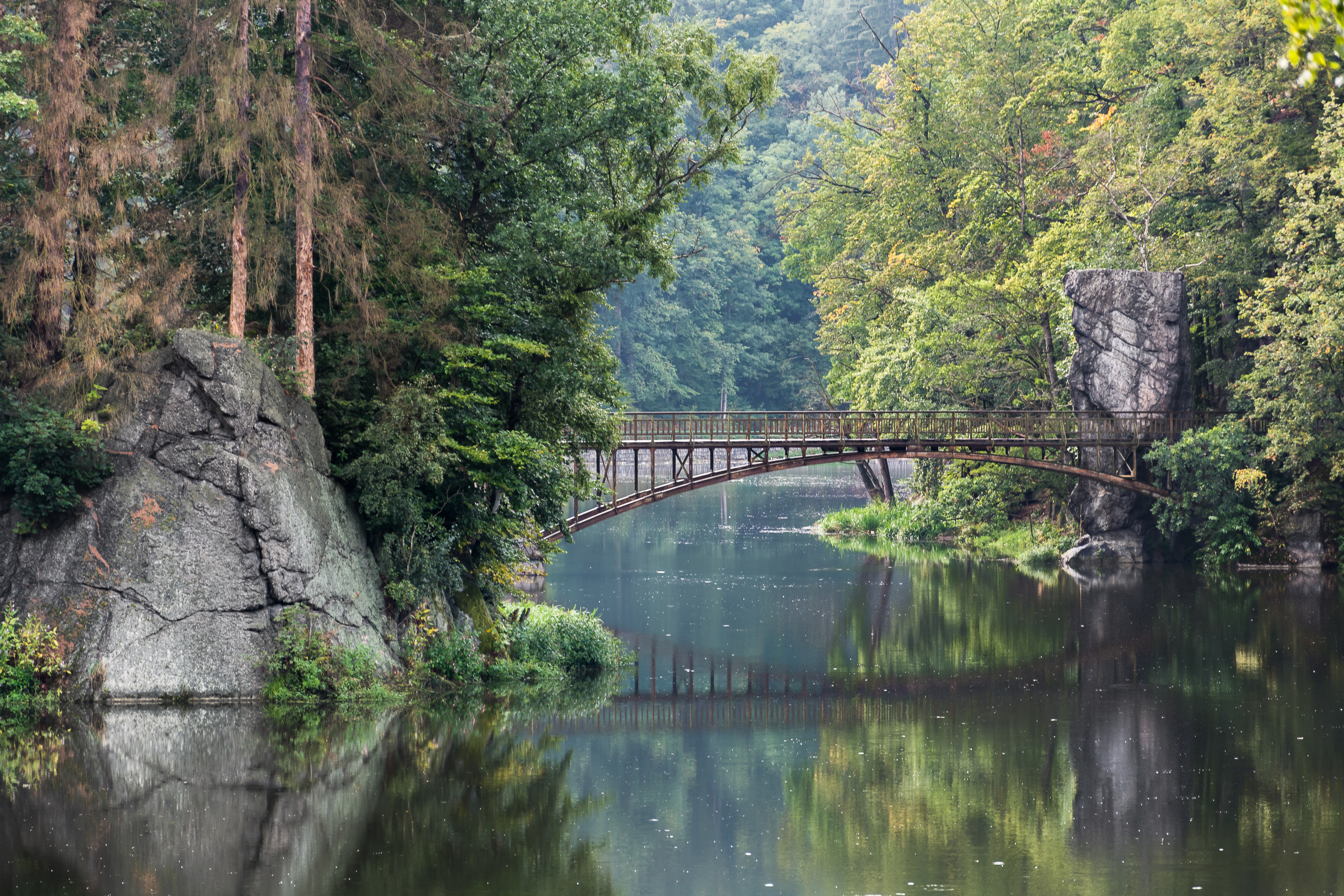
- Bóbr River in the southeast of the park Park logo with Bóbr River
- Interactive map of Bóbr Valley Landscape Park
- Location: Lower Silesian Voivodeship
- Coordinates: 51°0′N 15°39′E
- Area: 109.43 km^{2} (42.25 sq mi)
- Established: 1989
- Website: Park Krajobrazowy Doliny Bobru (in Polish)

Bóbr Valley Landscape Park (Park Krajobrazowy Doliny Bobru) is a protected area in south-western Poland.

The Park lies within Lower Silesian Voivodeship: in Karkonosze County (Gmina Jeżów Sudecki, Gmina Stara Kamienica), Lwówek County (Gmina Lwówek Śląski, Gmina Lubomierz, Gmina Wleń) and Złotoryja County (Gmina Świerzawa). The Bóbr river, with a length of 272 kilometres (169 mi), runs through it, south to north.

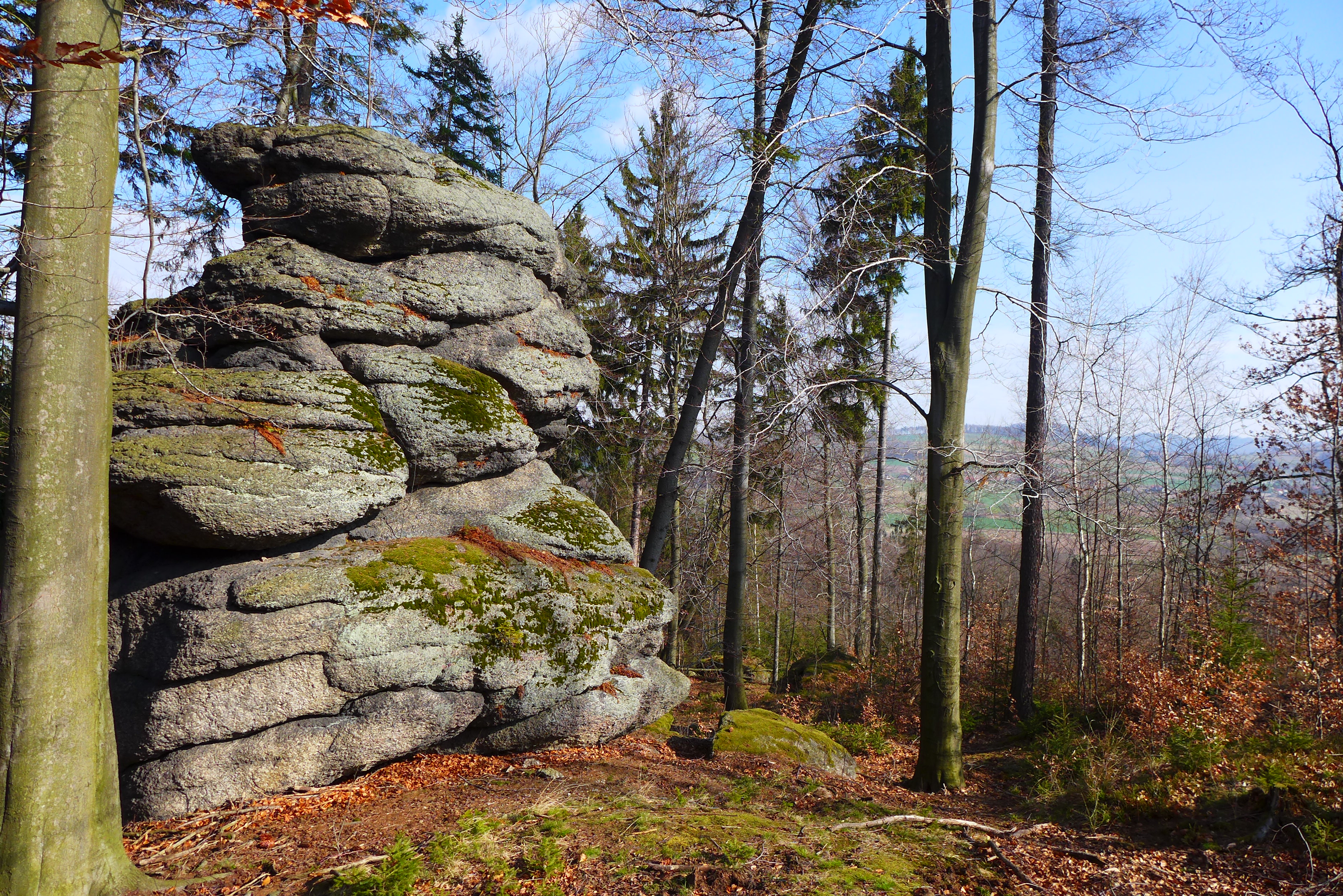
Rock formation on the valley slopes, near Jelenia Góra

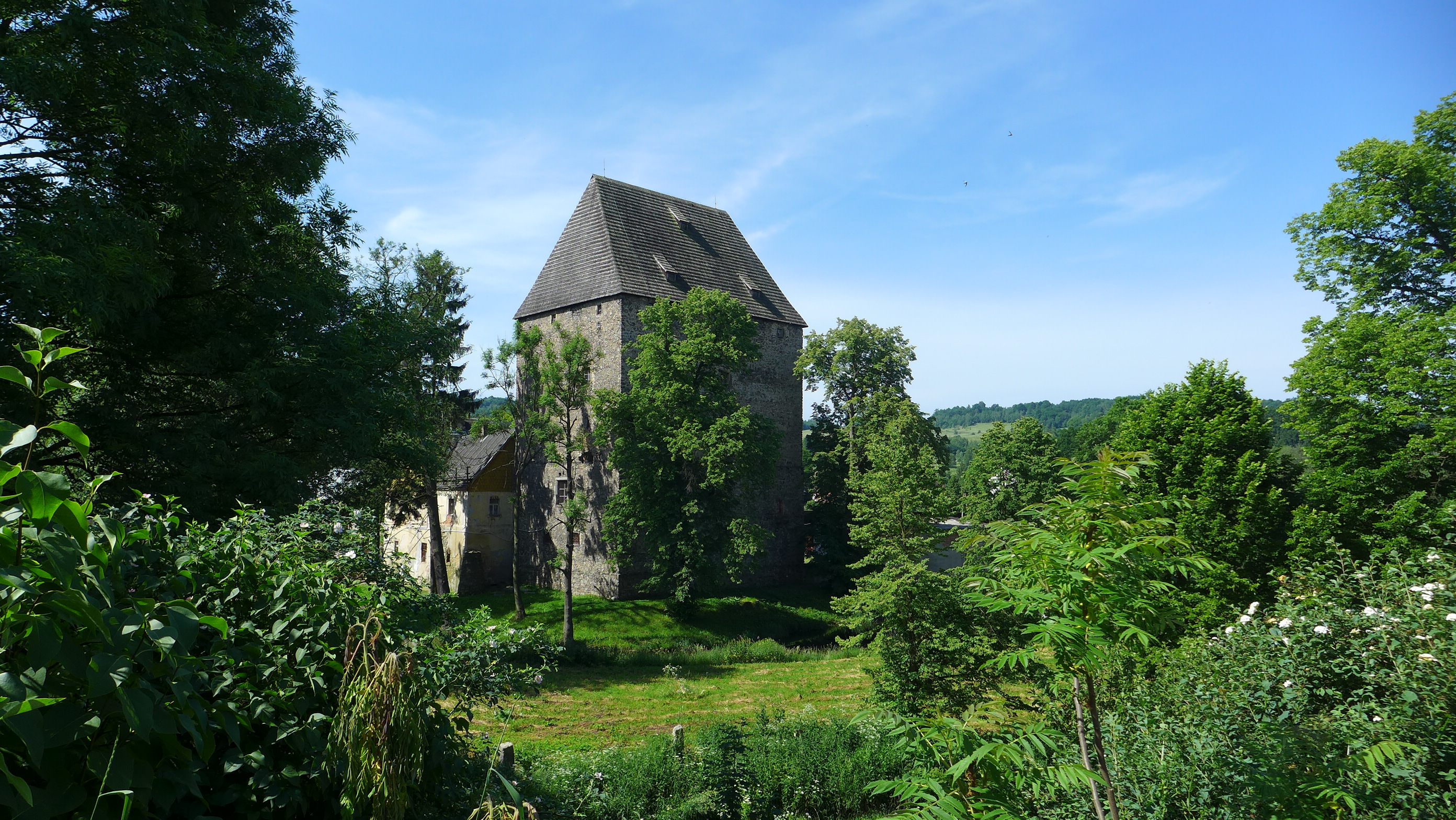
At Siedlęcin

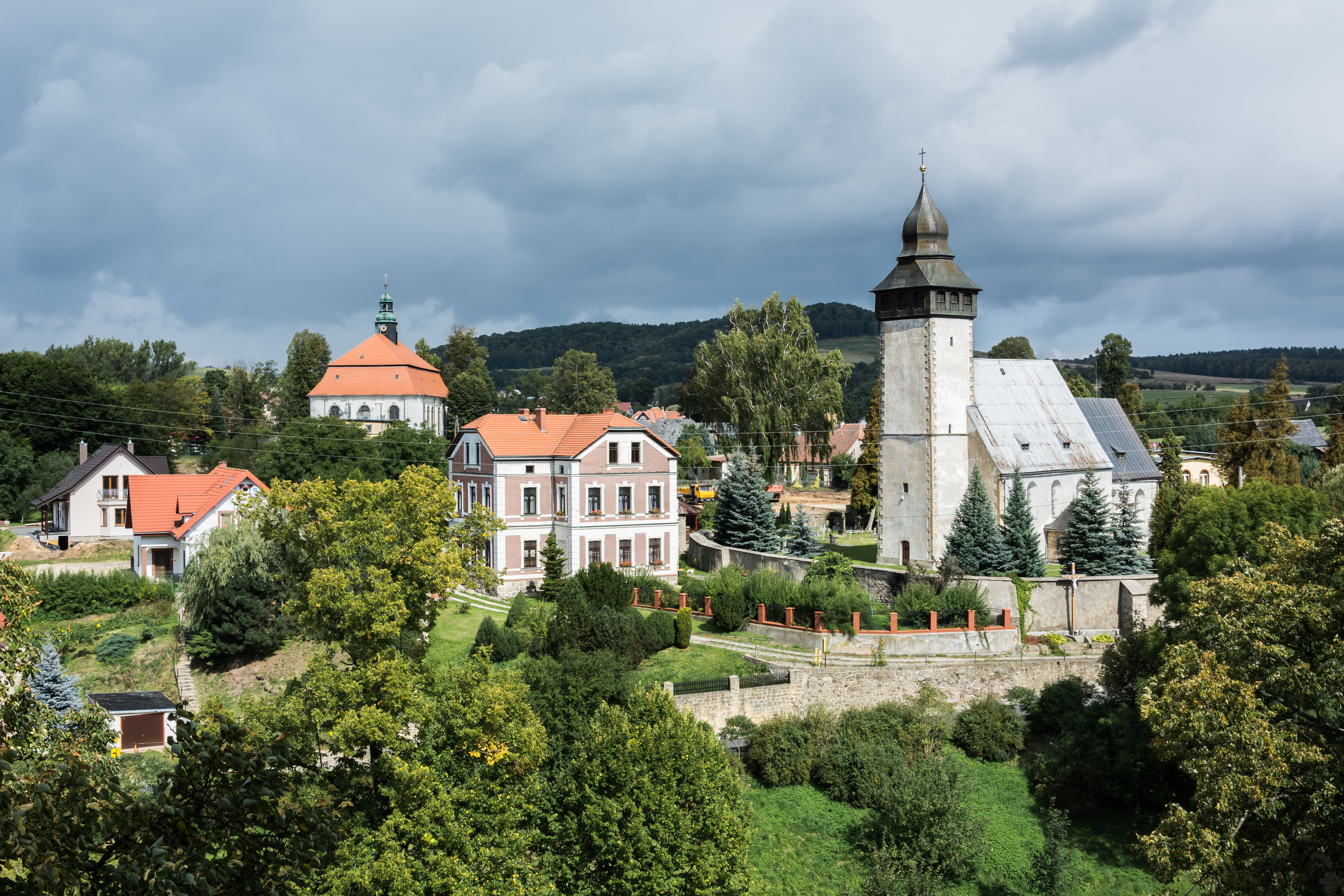
The old village of Siedlęcin

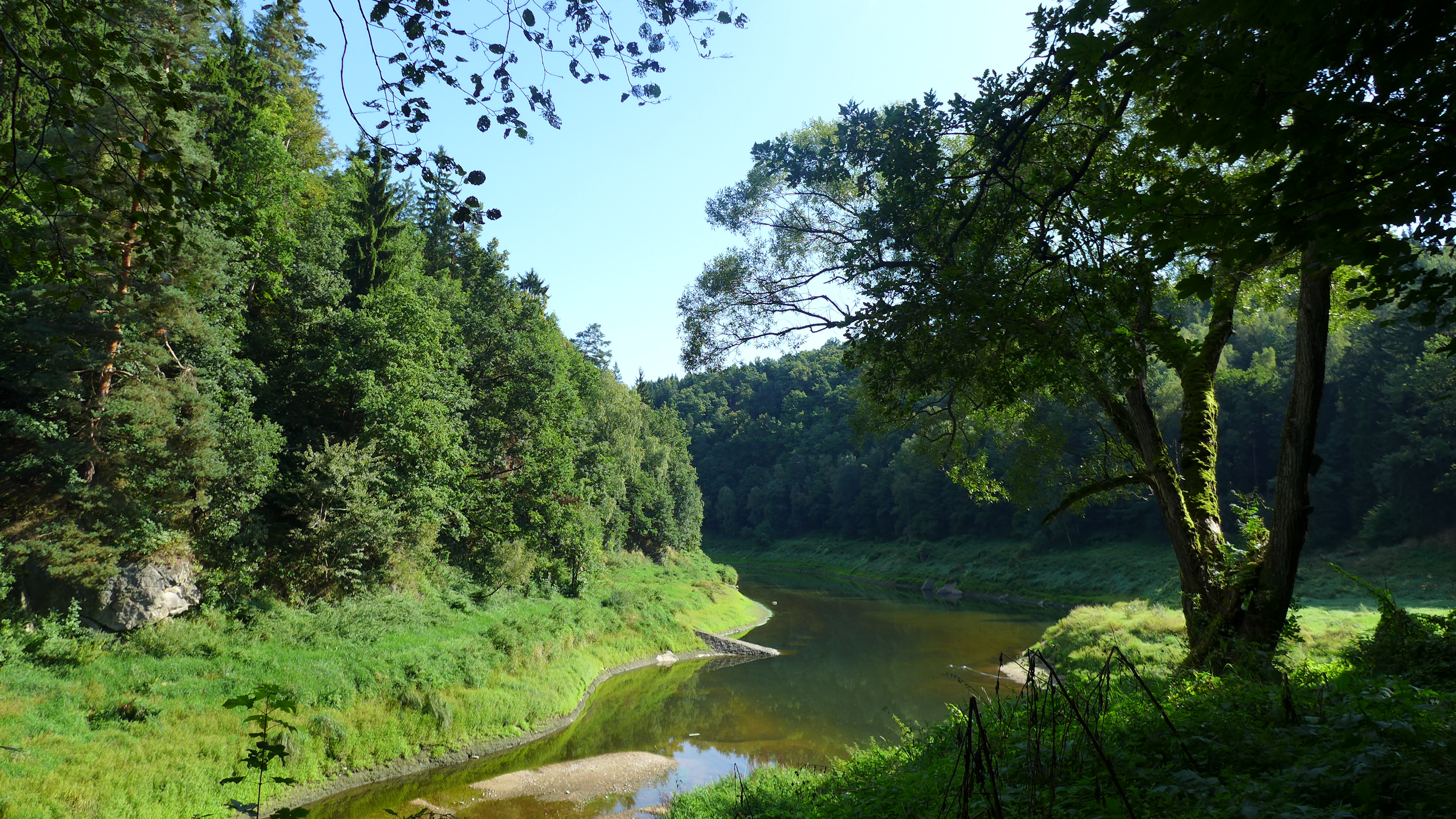
At the small tributary stream of Kamienica

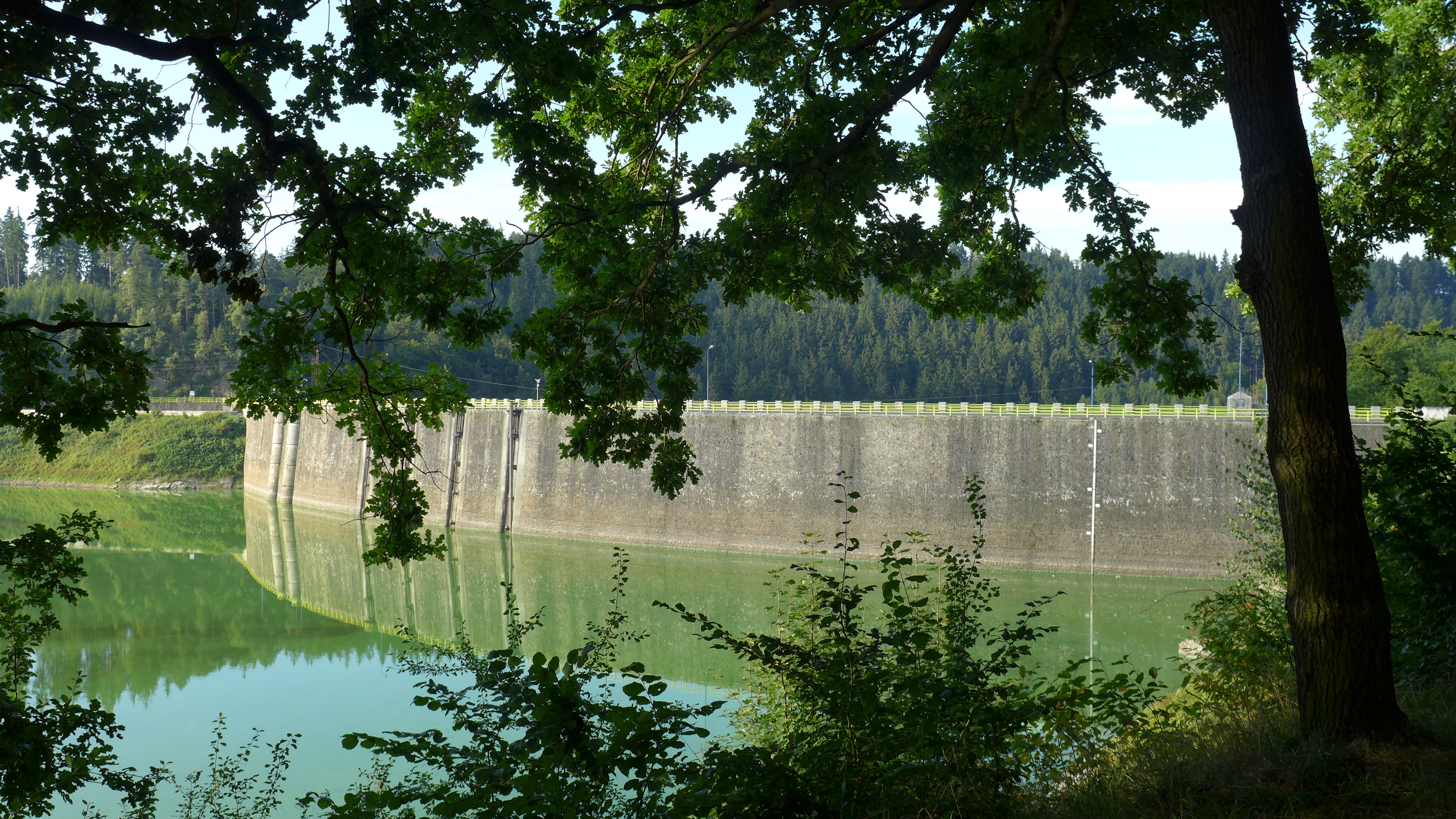
The dam at Pilchowickie Lake

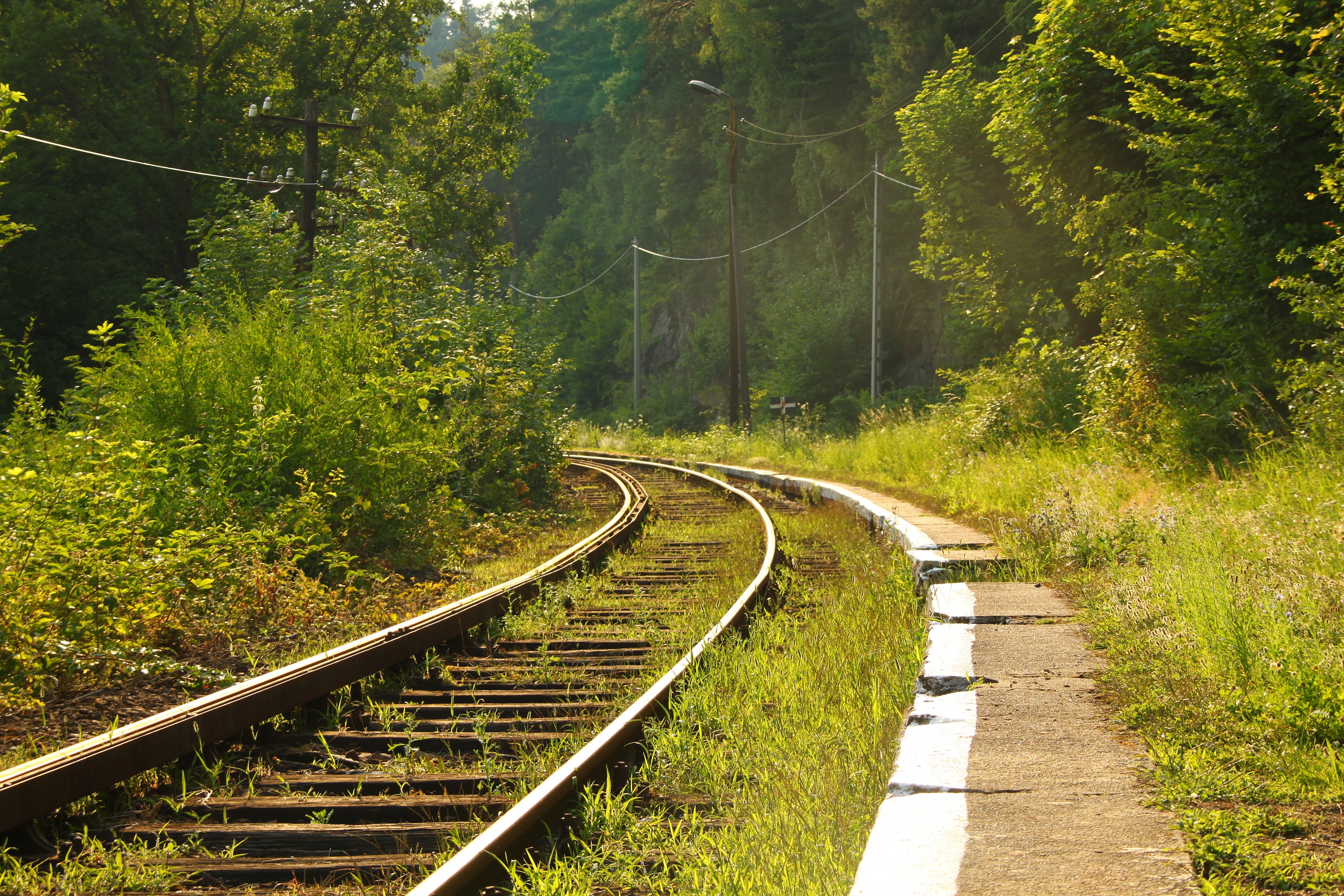
Railtracks traverse the park

== See also ==
- List of Landscape Parks of Poland
- Bóbr Valley Landscape Park seen from the drone
