= Eagles' Nests Landscape Park =

Protected area in Poland

Eagle Nests Landscape Park
- Park Krajobrazowy Orlich Gniazd
- IUCN category V (protected landscape/seascape)
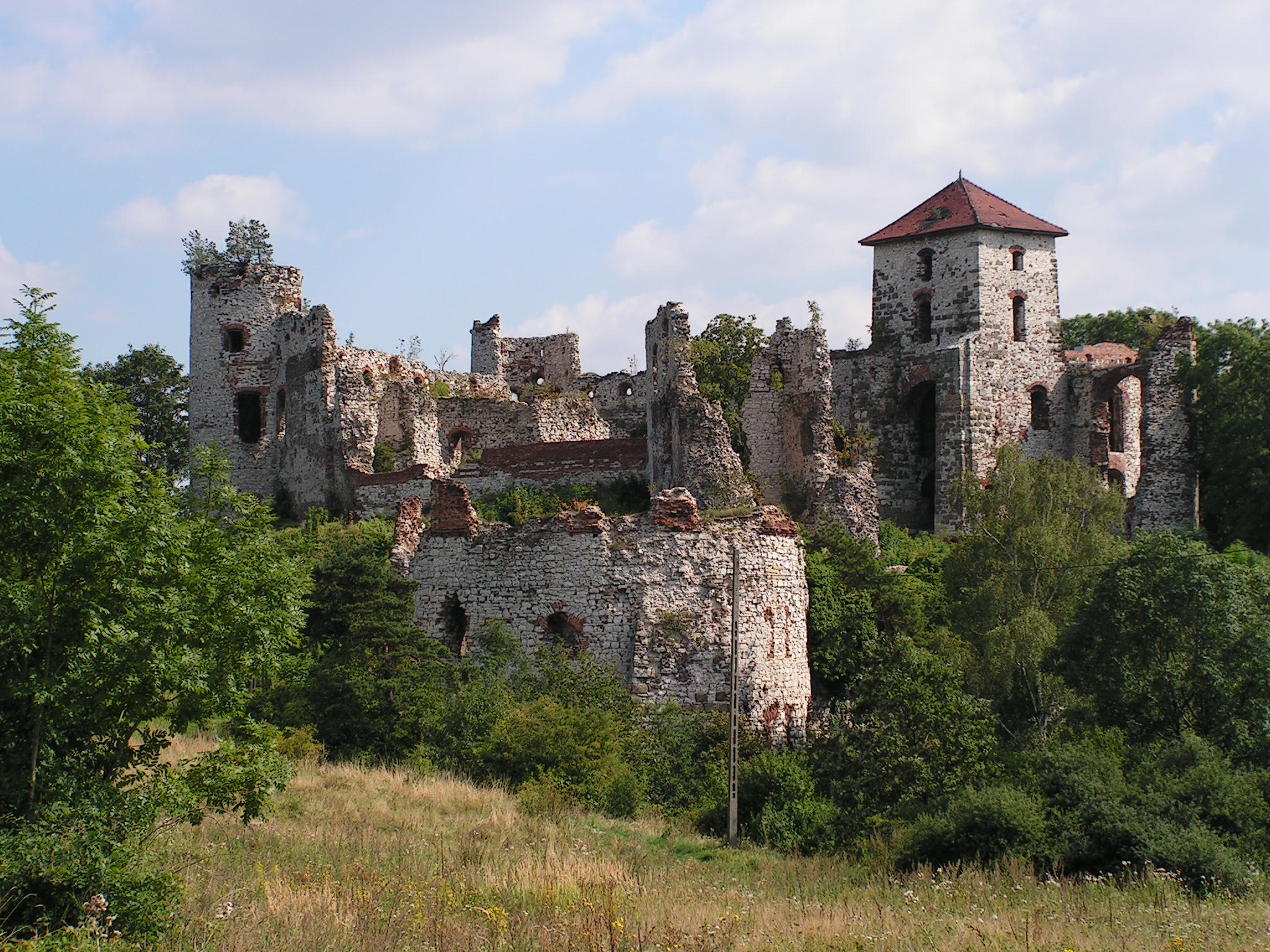
- Castle in Teczyn on the Trail of the Eagles' Nests

- Location within Poland
- Location: South Poland
- Coordinates: 50.605°N 19.485°E
- Area: 597 km^{2} (231 mi^{2})
- Established: 1980

The Eagles' Nests Landscape Park (Park Krajobrazowy Orlich Gniazd) is a 597 km^{2} (231 mi^{2}) protected area in south-western Poland, and one of over 120 Polish official Landscape parks. It was established in 1980, and covers much of the area of the Trail of the Eagles' Nests, marked as No. 1 on the official list of tourist trails. The trail passes by some 25 medieval castles called the Eagles' Nests, built on large, tall rocks by the order of King Casimir III the Great.

== Location ==
The Park (Polish: park krajobrazowy) is shared between two voivodeships: Lesser Poland and Silesian Voivodeship or more specifically its Częstochowa County (Gmina Janów, Gmina Olsztyn) and Zawiercie County (Gmina Łazy, Gmina Ogrodzieniec).

The Park lies within the Polish Jura formation also known as the Polish Jurassic Highland or Kraków-Częstochowa Upland (Polish: Jura Krakowsko-Częstochowska), stretching between the cities of Kraków, Częstochowa and Wieluń. The Polish Jura, along with its numerous medieval castles (Polish: Orle Gniazda) built by King Casimir (1310–1370), is visited by roughly 400,000 visitors a year. Part of the Upland belongs to the Ojców National Park, the smallest of Poland's twenty national parks, ranking among the most attractive recreational areas in the country.

== Notes and references ==
- Poland by Neil Wilson, Tom Parkinson, Richard Watkins, Lonely Planet
- (in Polish) List of castles
- (in Polish) Map of the castles Śląskie Voivodship
- (in Polish) Map of the castles Greater Poland Voivodeship

Media related to Eagles' Nests Landscape Park at Wikimedia Commons
