= Wieprz =

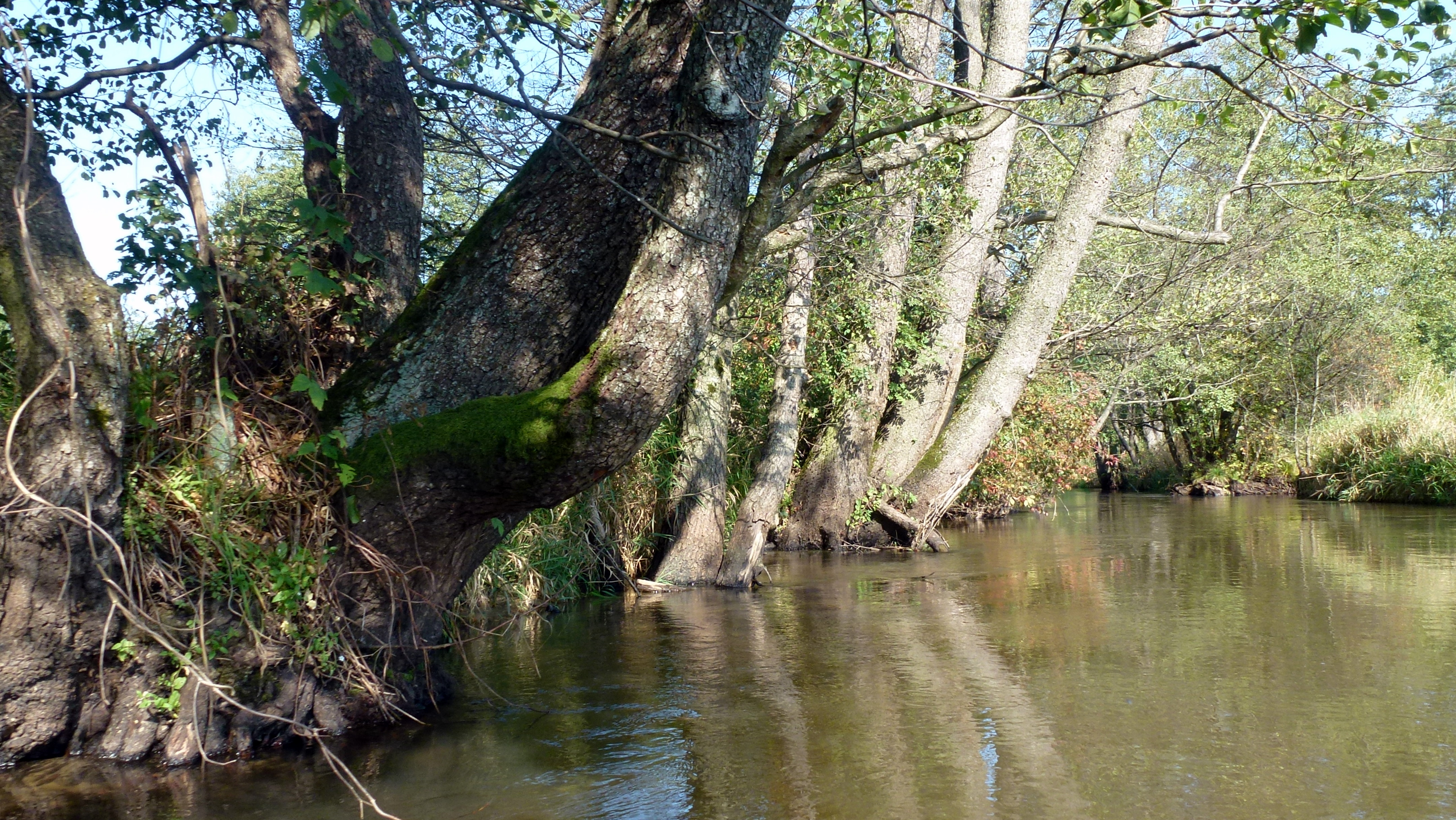
- Wieprz in Roztocze National Park

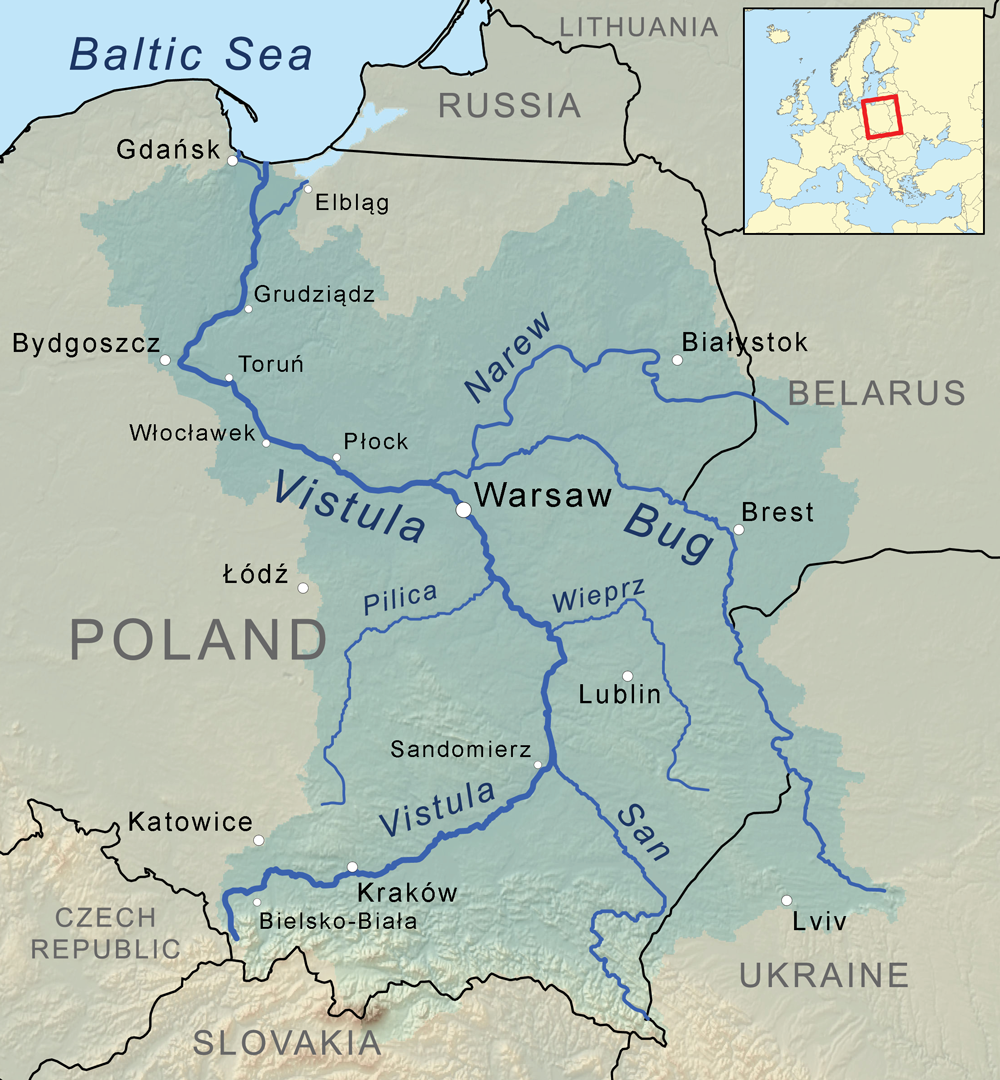
- Wieprz River in the Vistula watershed
- Native name: Вепр (Ukrainian)

Location
- Country: Poland
- Voivodeship: Mazovian, Lublin

Physical characteristics
- Source
  - location: Wieprzów Tarnawacki, Lublin Voivodeship, Poland
  - coordinates: 50°30′01.7″N 23°26′14.4″E
  - elevation: 274 m
- Mouth
  - location: Dęblin, Lublin Voivodeship, Poland
  - coordinates: 51°32′49″N 21°50′4″E
  - elevation: 112 m
- Length: 303 km (188 mi)
- Basin size: 10,497 km^{2} (4,053 sq mi)
- Discharge
  - average: 35.9 m^{3}/s (1,270 cu ft/s)

Basin features
- Progression: Vistula→ Baltic Sea

The Wieprz (Polish: [ˈvjɛpʂ], lit. '"Boar"'; Ukrainian: Вепр, romanized: Vepr) is a river in central-eastern Poland, and a tributary of the Vistula. It is the country's ninth longest river, with a total length of 303 km and a catchment area of 10,497 km^{2}, all within Poland. Its course near the town of Łęczna includes the protected area known as Wieprz Landscape Park.

The river has its source in Lake Wieprz, in Wieprzów Tarnawacki near Tomaszow Lubelski, and flows into the Vistula near Dęblin. The Wieprz is connected to another river, the Krzna, through the 140-kilometer Wieprz-Krzna Canal, built in 1954-1961. Because the Wieprz with its wide valley has not been regulated, its nature is very diverse. The meandering river with its oxbow lakes is inhabited by numerous birds, European otters and Eurasian beavers.

During the Polish-Soviet War, units of the Polish 4th Army concentrated along the Wieprz, getting ready for the Battle of Warsaw. In September 1939, during the Invasion of Poland, the Battle of Tomaszow Lubelski took place by the Wieprz.

== Towns on the Wieprz ==
- Krasnobród
- Zwierzyniec
- Szczebrzeszyn
- Krasnystaw
- Łęczna
- Lubartów
- Dęblin

== See also ==
- List of rivers in Poland
