= Gopło Landscape Park (Kuyavian-Pomeranian Voivodship) =

Protected area in Poland

Gopło Millennium Landscape Park
- Park Krajobrazowy Nadgoplański, Park Tysiąclecia
- IUCN category V (protected landscape/seascape)
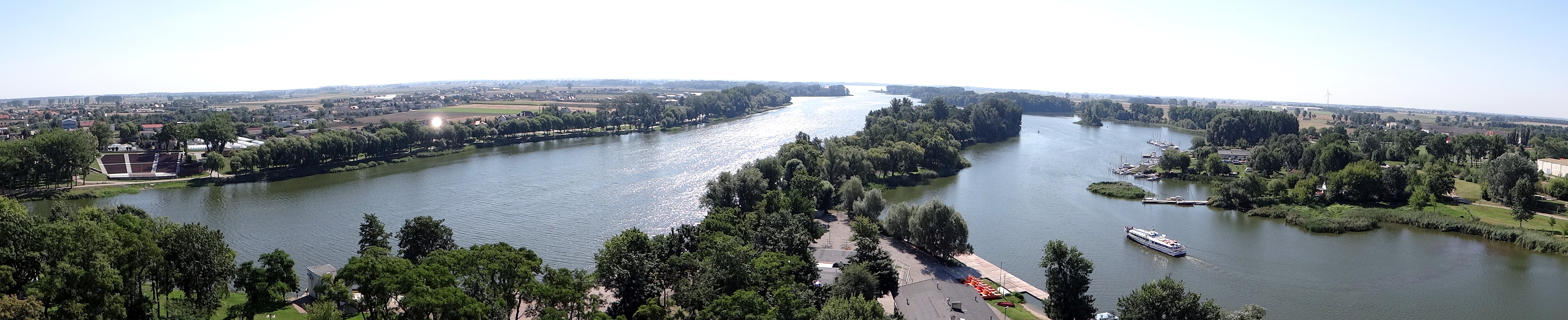

- Location within Poland
- Location: Kuyavian-Pomeranian Voivodeship, Poland
- Coordinates: 52.591°N 18.349°E
- Area: 99.82 km^{2} (38.54 sq mi)
- Established: 1992

Gopło Landscape Park also Gopło Millennium Park (Park Krajobrazowy Nadgoplański, Park Tysiąclecia) is a protected area (Landscape Park) around Gopło lake in north-central Poland. The Park was established in 1992, and covers an area of 99.82 square kilometres (38.54 sq mi).

== Location ==
The Park lies within Kuyavian-Pomeranian Voivodeship: in Inowrocław County (Gmina Kruszwica), Mogilno County (Gmina Jeziora Wielkie) and Radziejów County (Gmina Piotrków Kujawski).

== See also ==
- List of Landscape Parks of Poland
