= Żerków-Czeszewo Landscape Park =

Protected area in Poland

Coordinates: 52.1231°N 17.5333°E

- Żerkowsko-Czeszewski Park Krajobrazowy
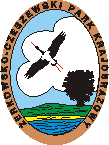

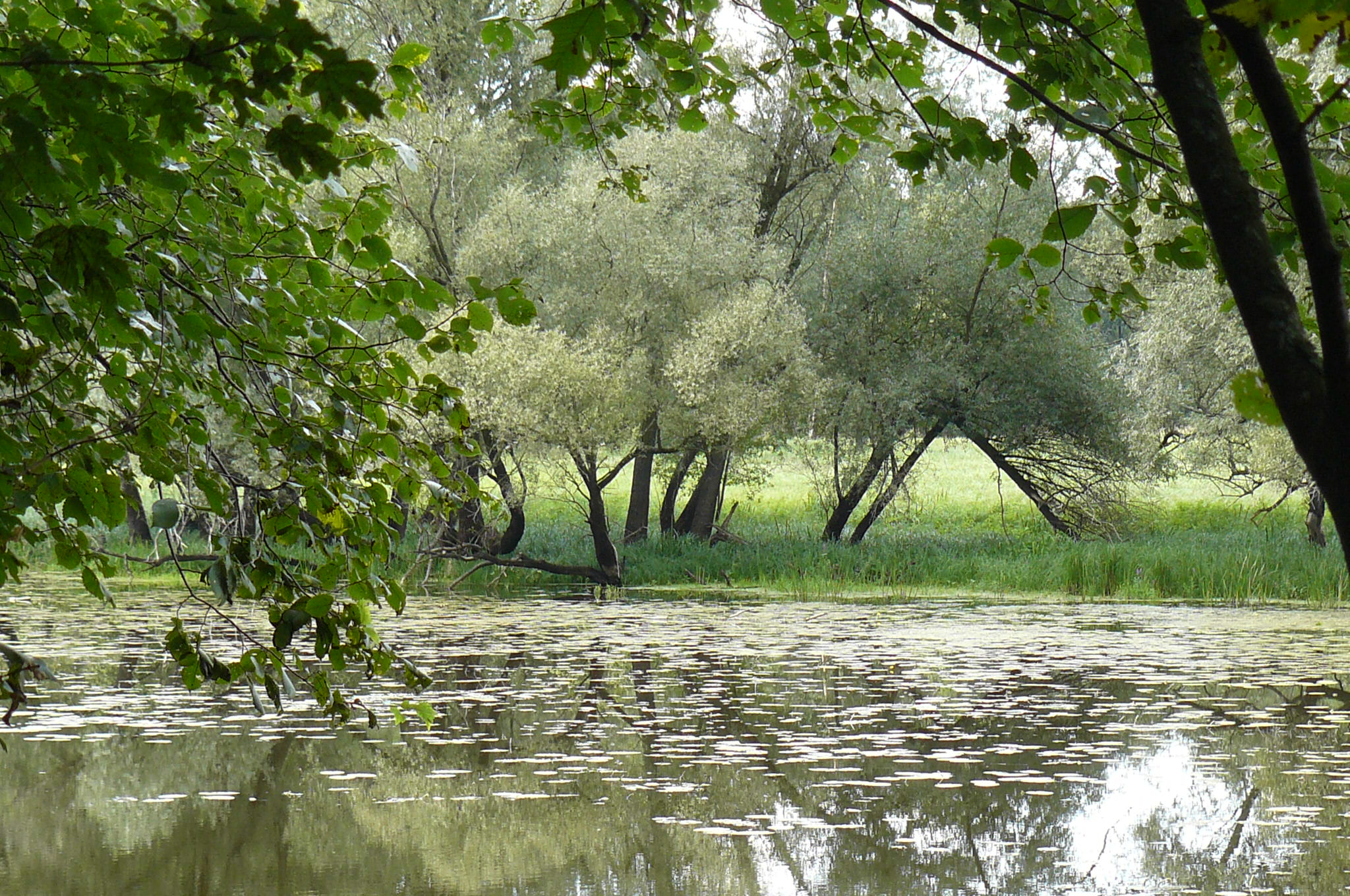
- Interactive map of Żerków-Czeszewo Landscape Park
- Location: Greater Poland Voivodeship
- Area: 157.95 km^{2} (60.98 mi^{2})
- Established: 1994; 32 years ago

Żerków-Czeszewo Landscape Park (Żerkowsko-Czeszewski Park Krajobrazowy) is a protected area (Landscape Park) in west-central Poland.

The Park lies within Greater Poland Voivodeship. The area of the park is 15,794.84 ha.

== Cultural values ==
On the territory of Zerkowsko-Czeszewo Landscape Park there is a palace in Smielow from the end of the 18th century, where Adam Mickiewicz stayed in the summer of 1831 and where there is a museum named after him, established in 1975. One of the most valuable monuments is also the built 15th-century Gothic church in the village of Debno. On the northern edge of the Park is the 19th-century neo-Renaissance Mielżyński Palace in Miloslaw with its extensive preserved parkland.
