= Łomża Landscape Park =

Protected park in Poland

- Polish: Łomżyński Park Krajobrazowy Doliny Narwi
- IUCN category V (protected landscape/seascape)
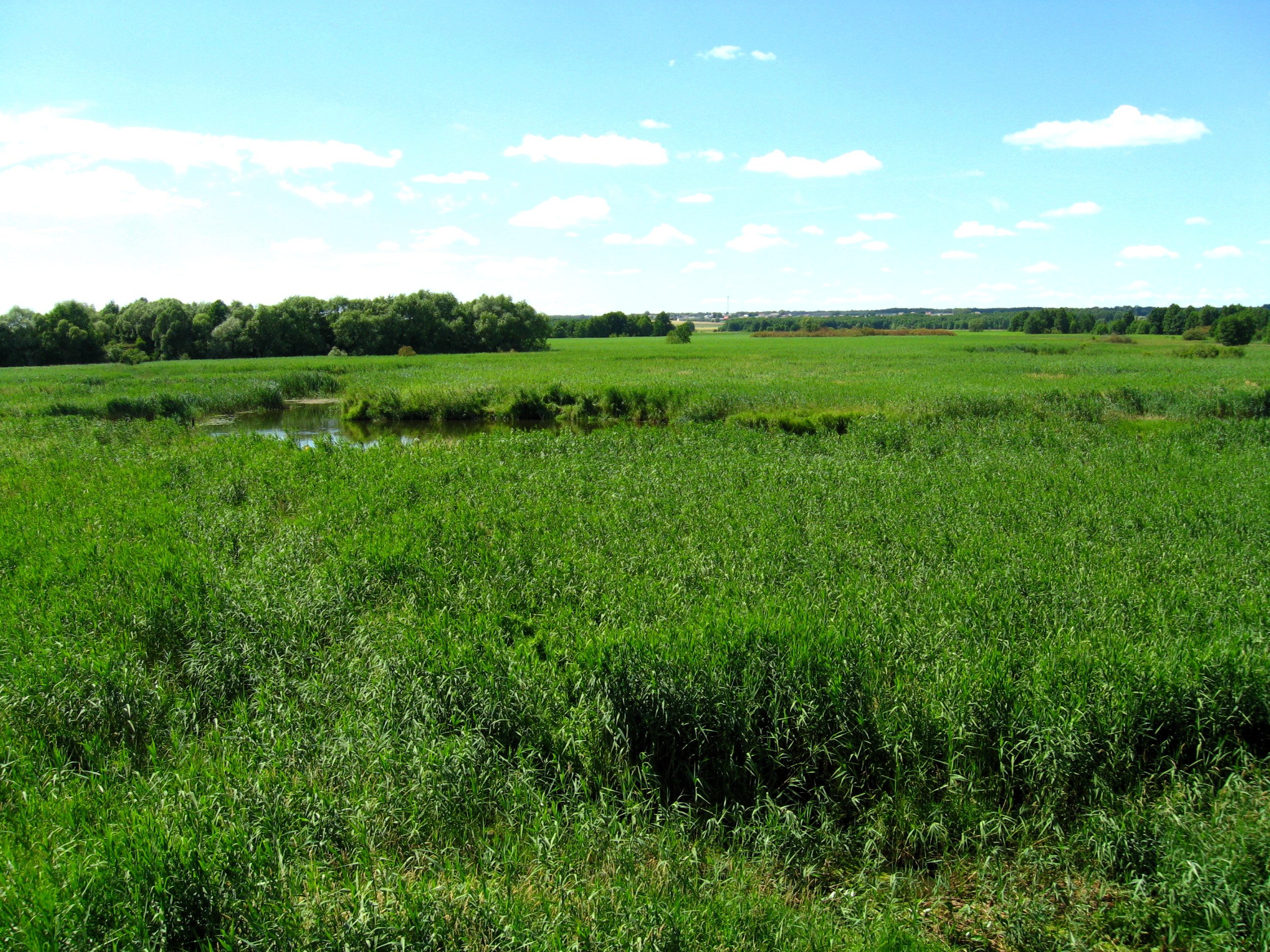
- The marshes of Narew River near Łomża Park logo

- Location within Poland
- Location: Podlaskie Voivodeship, Poland
- Nearest city: Łomża
- Coordinates: 53°10′00″N 22°05′00″E
- Area: 19.664 km^{2} (7.592 sq mi)
- Established: 1994
- Governing body: Ministry of the Environment
- Website: WrotaPodlasia.pl

Łomża Landscape Park of the Narew Valley (Polish: Łomżyński Park Krajobrazowy Doliny Narwi) is a protected area (Landscape Park) in north-eastern Poland, on the banks of the Narew river, close to the town of Łomża, to the south-east.

== Features ==
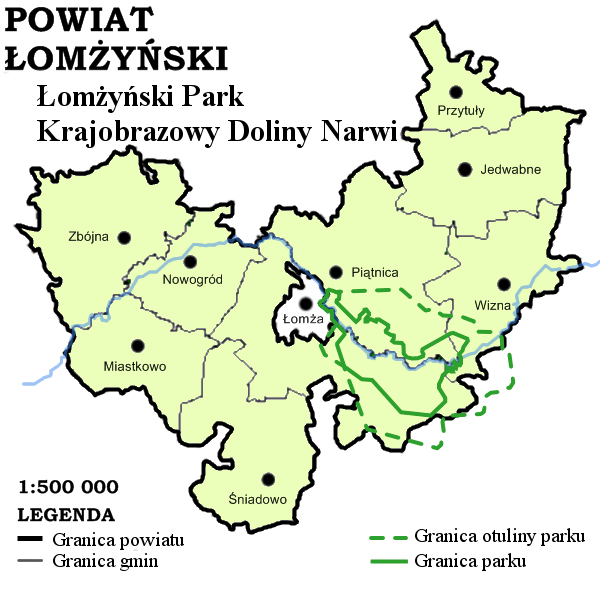
Map of Łomża County, with the outline of Łomża Landscape Park marked in green. Protected area marked by a dashed green line. Narew river marked in blue

The Park lies within the Podlaskie Voivodeship: in Łomża County (covering Gmina Łomża, Gmina Piątnica, Gmina Wizna) and in Zambrów County (Gmina Rutki).

The protected area of the park consists of unique landscape features such as pristine valleys and marshes with high aesthetic appeal. The total area under protection amounts to 19,664 ha, with 7,353.5 ha within the park itself and the remaining 12,310.5 ha forming its protective buffer zone (Polish: otulina).

There are two nature reserves in the Park: Kalinowo and Wielki Dział.

== See also ==
- List of Landscape Parks of Poland
