= Bystrzyca Valley Landscape Park =

Landscape park in Poland

Coordinates: 51°08′07″N 16°49′33″E

- Park Krajobrazowy Dolina Bystrzycy
- IUCN category V (protected landscape/seascape)
- Interactive map of Bystrzyca Valley Landscape Park
- Location: Lower Silesian Voivodeship

Bystrzyca Valley Landscape Park (Park Krajobrazowy Dolina Bystrzycy) is a protected area (Landscape Park) in south-western Poland.

The Park lies within Lower Silesian Voivodeship. The park was created in 1998.
