= Krzczonów Landscape Park =

Protected area in Poland

Coordinates: 51.0244°N 22.7633°E

- Krzczonowski Park Krajobrazowy
- IUCN category V (protected landscape/seascape)
- Interactive map of Krzczonów Landscape Park
- Location: Lublin Voivodeship
- Area: 124.21 km^{2} (47.96 sq mi)
- Established: 1990

Krzczonów Landscape Park (Krzczonowski Park Krajobrazowy) is a protected area (Landscape Park) in eastern Poland, established in 1990, covering an area of 124.21 square kilometres (47.96 sq mi).

The Park lies within Lublin Voivodeship.
