= Wieprz Landscape Park =

Protected area in eastern Poland

Coordinates: 51.1739°N 23.0053°E

- Nadwieprzański Park Krajobrazowy
- IUCN category V (protected landscape/seascape)
- Interactive map of Wieprz Landscape Park
- Location: Lublin Voivodeship
- Area: 44.32 km^{2} (17.11 sq mi)
- Established: 1990

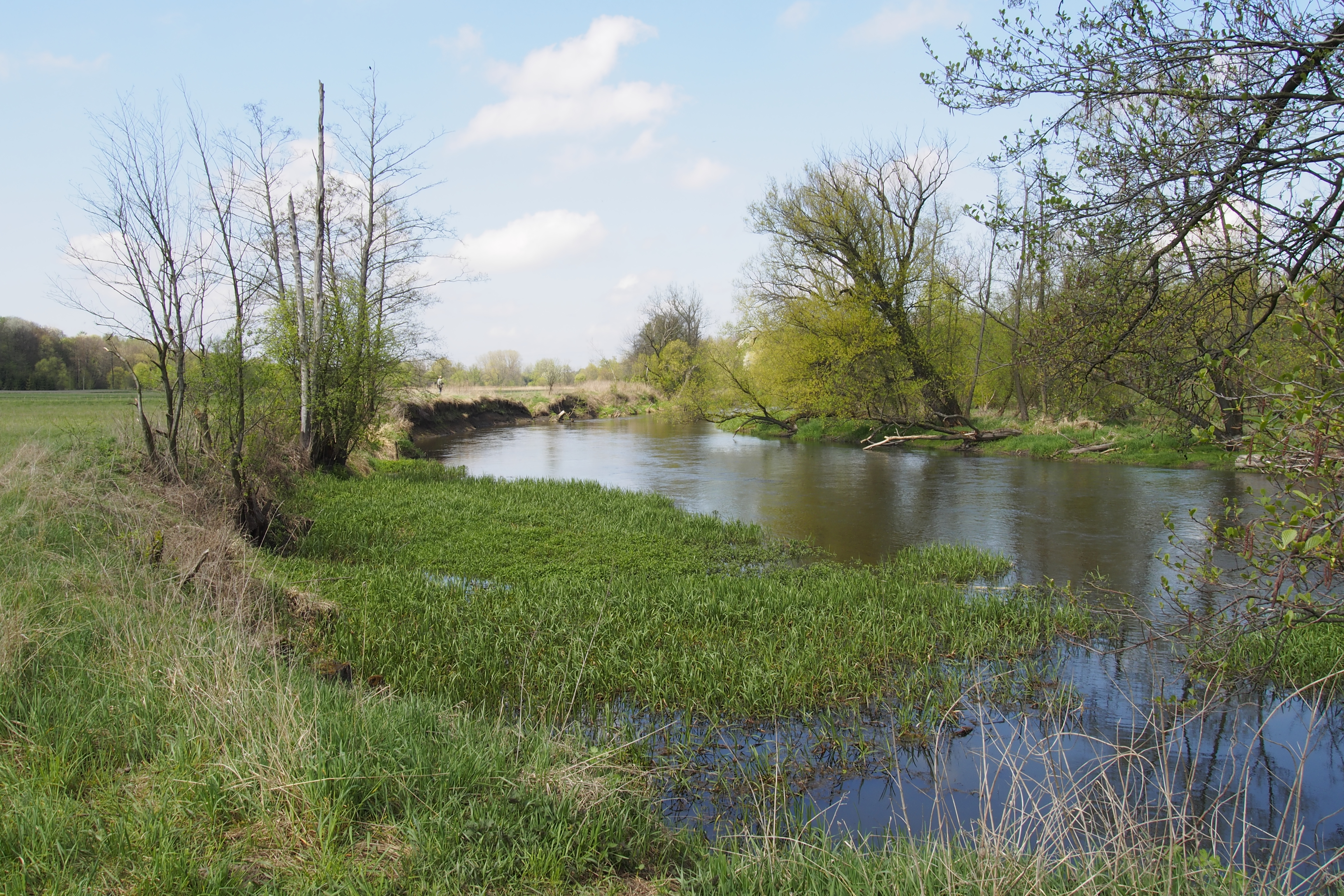

Wieprz Landscape Park (Nadwieprzański Park Krajobrazowy) is a protected area (Landscape Park) in eastern Poland, established in 1990, covering an area of 44.32 square kilometres (17.11 sq mi).

The Park lies within Lublin Voivodeship, on a stretch of the Wieprz river near the town of Łęczna.
