= Chełmy Landscape Park =

Protected area in Poland

Coordinates: 51°03′N 16°03′E

- Park Krajobrazowy Chełmy
- IUCN category V (protected landscape/seascape)
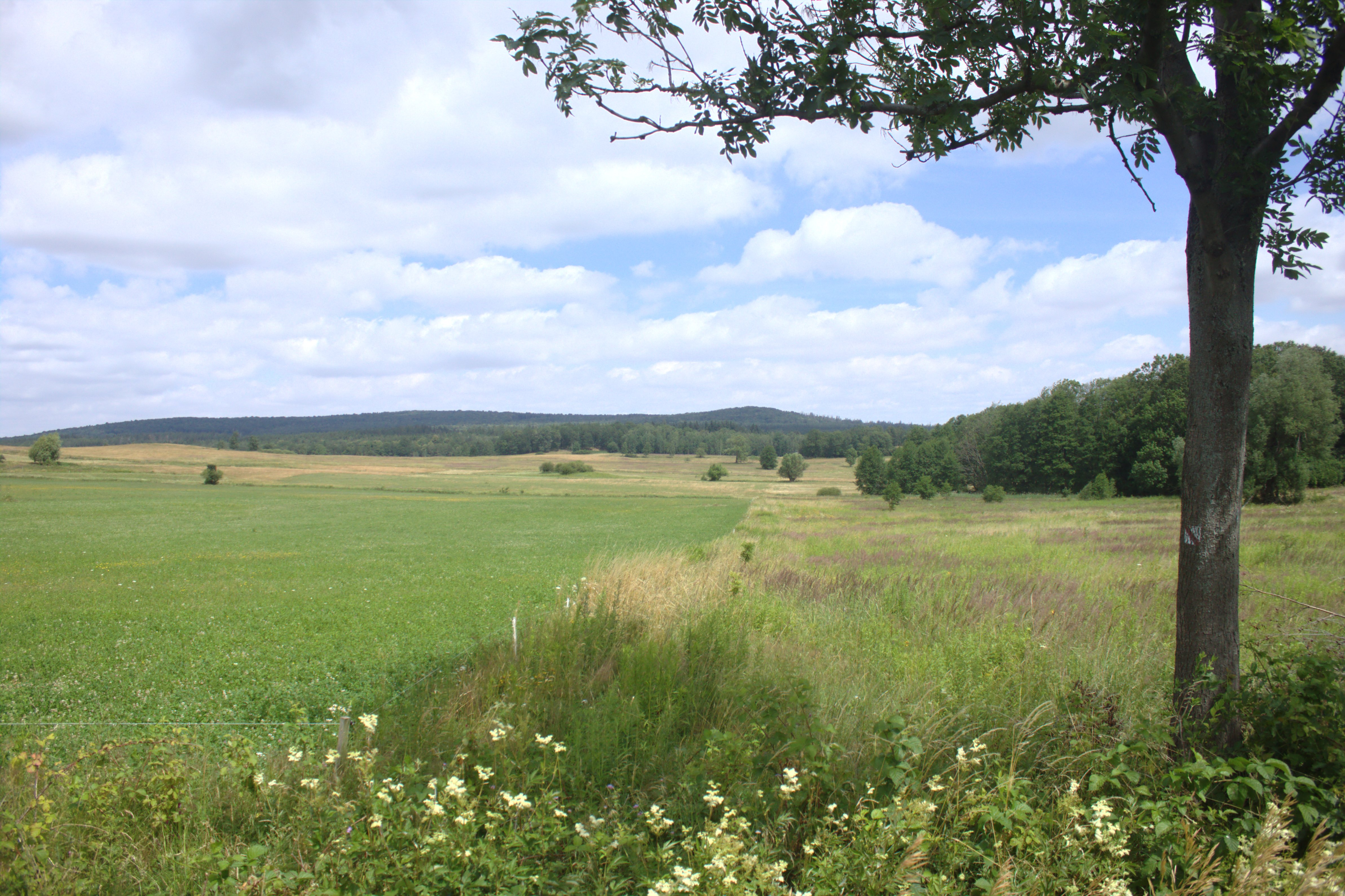
- Near the village of Nowa Wieś Mała
- Interactive map of Chełmy Landscape Park
- Location: Lower Silesian Voivodeship
- Area: 159.9 km^{2} (61.7 sq mi)
- Established: 1992
- Website: Park Krajobrazowy "Chełmy" (in Polish)

Chełmy Landscape Park (Park Krajobrazowy Chełmy) is a protected area (Landscape Park) in south-western Poland, established in 1992, covering an area of 159.9 square kilometres (61.7 sq mi).

The Park lies within Lower Silesian Voivodeship: in Jawor County (Gmina Bolków, Gmina Męcinka, Gmina Paszowice) and Legnica County (Gmina Krotoszyce).

Within the Landscape Park are four nature reserves.

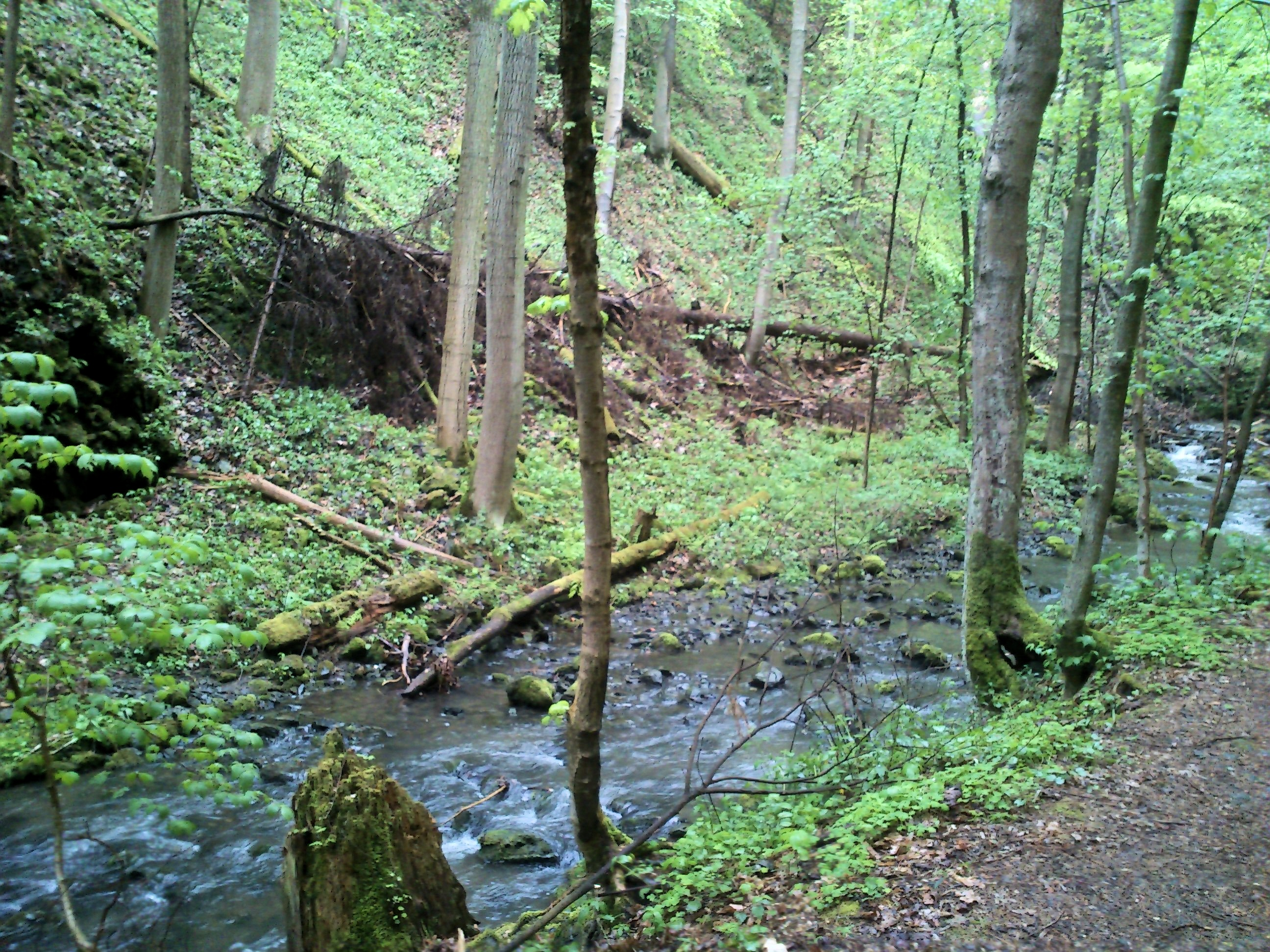
From one of the four nature reserves

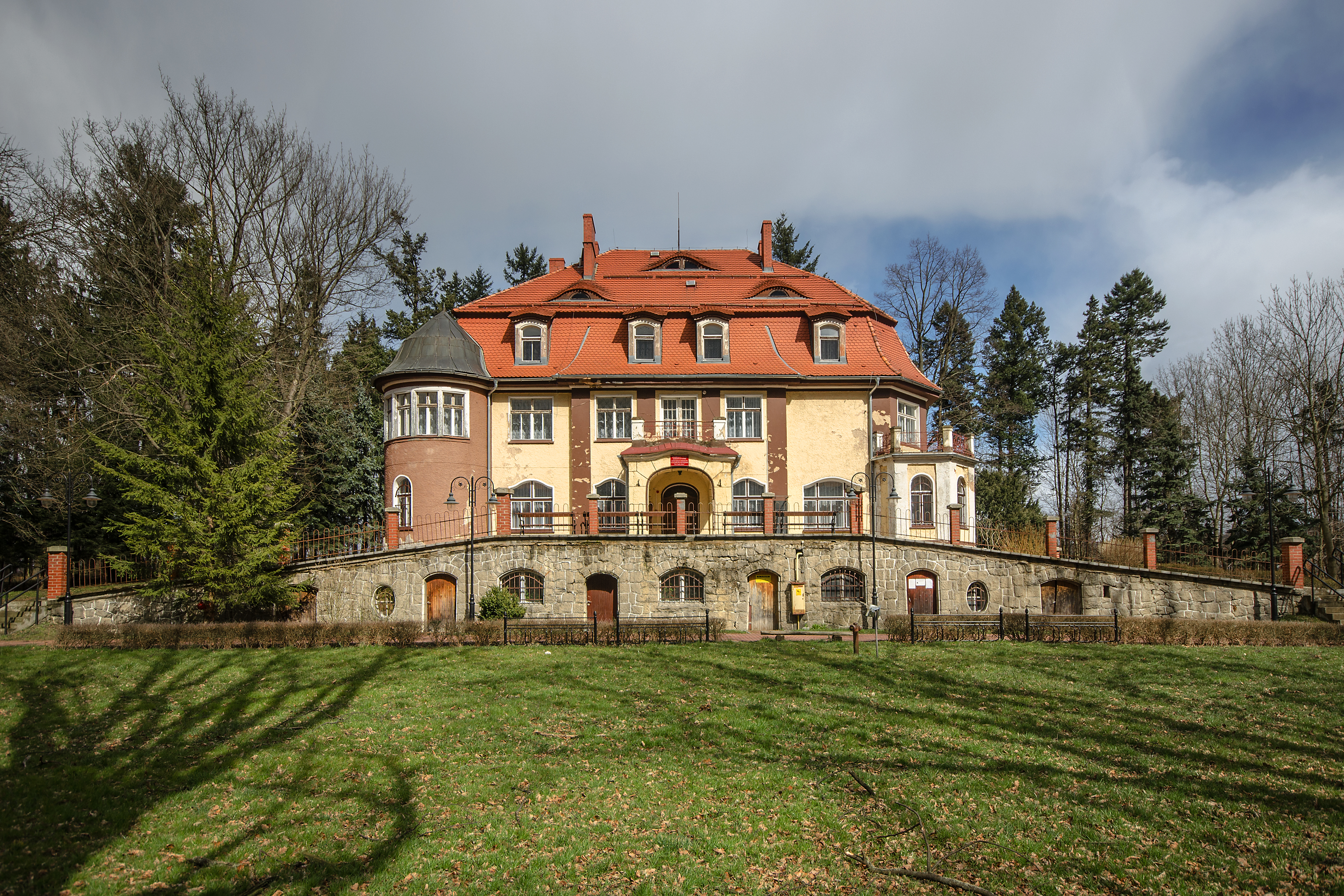
The palace in Muchów
