= Rudno Landscape Park =

Protected area in Poland

- Rudniański Park Krajobrazowy
- IUCN category V (protected landscape/seascape)
- Interactive map of Rudno Landscape Park
- Location: Lesser Poland Voivodeship
- Coordinates: 50°02′15″N 19°35′10″E

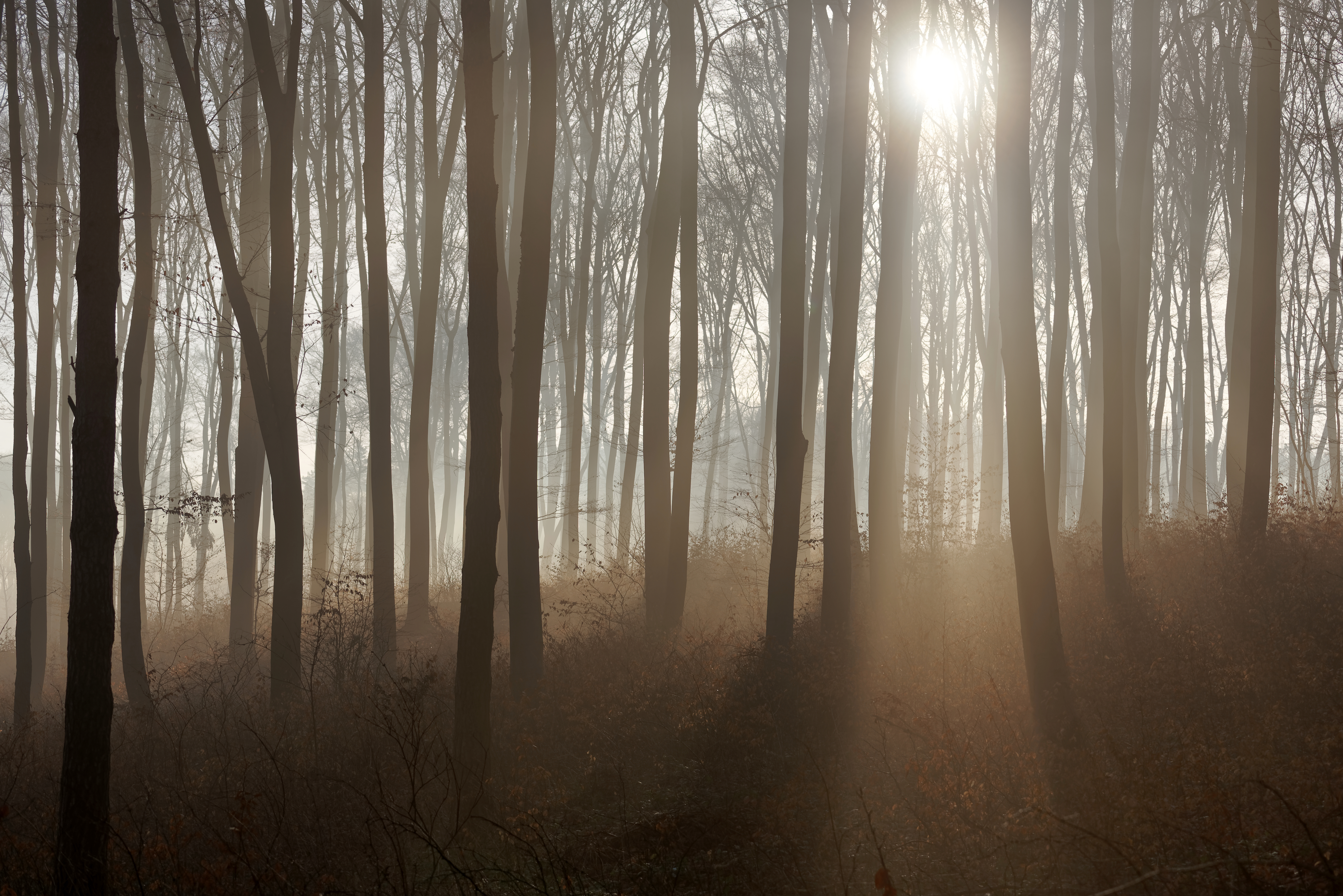
Forest in the morning fog, Czernichów commune, Lesser Poland Voivodeship

Rudno Landscape Park (Rudniański Park Krajobrazowy) is a protected area (Landscape Park) in southern Poland. The area of the park is 58.139 km^{2}, while its buffer zone is 67.13 km^{2}. Established in 1981.

The Park lies within Lesser Poland Voivodeship. It takes its name from the village of Rudno.

There are two nature reserves in the park:

- Rudno Potok Valley – a forest and landscape reserve, established in 2001; it includes a fragment of a well-preserved alder forest and geological sites of the former porphyry quarry.
- Kajasówka – an inanimate nature reserve, established in 1962; the unique tectonic framework covered with xerothermic vegetation is protected.

The park is part of the Jurassic Landscape Parks Complex.
