= Jezierzyca Valley Landscape Park =

Protected area in Poland

Coordinates: 51.3544°N 16.5483°E

- Park Krajobrazowy Dolina Jezierzycy
- IUCN category V (protected landscape/seascape)
- Interactive map of Jezierzyca Valley Landscape Park
- Location: Lower Silesian Voivodeship
- Area: 79.53 km^{2} (30.71 sq mi)
- Established: 1994

Jezierzyca Valley Landscape Park (Park Krajobrazowy Dolina Jezierzycy) is a protected area (Landscape Park) in south-western Poland, established in 1994, covering an area of 79.53 square kilometres (30.71 sq mi).

The Park lies within Lower Silesian Voivodeship, in Wołów County (Gmina Wołów, Gmina Wińsko).
