= Załęcze Landscape Park =

Park in central Poland

Coordinates: 51°07′25″N 18°43′50″E

- Załęczański Park Krajobrazowy
- IUCN category V (protected landscape/seascape)
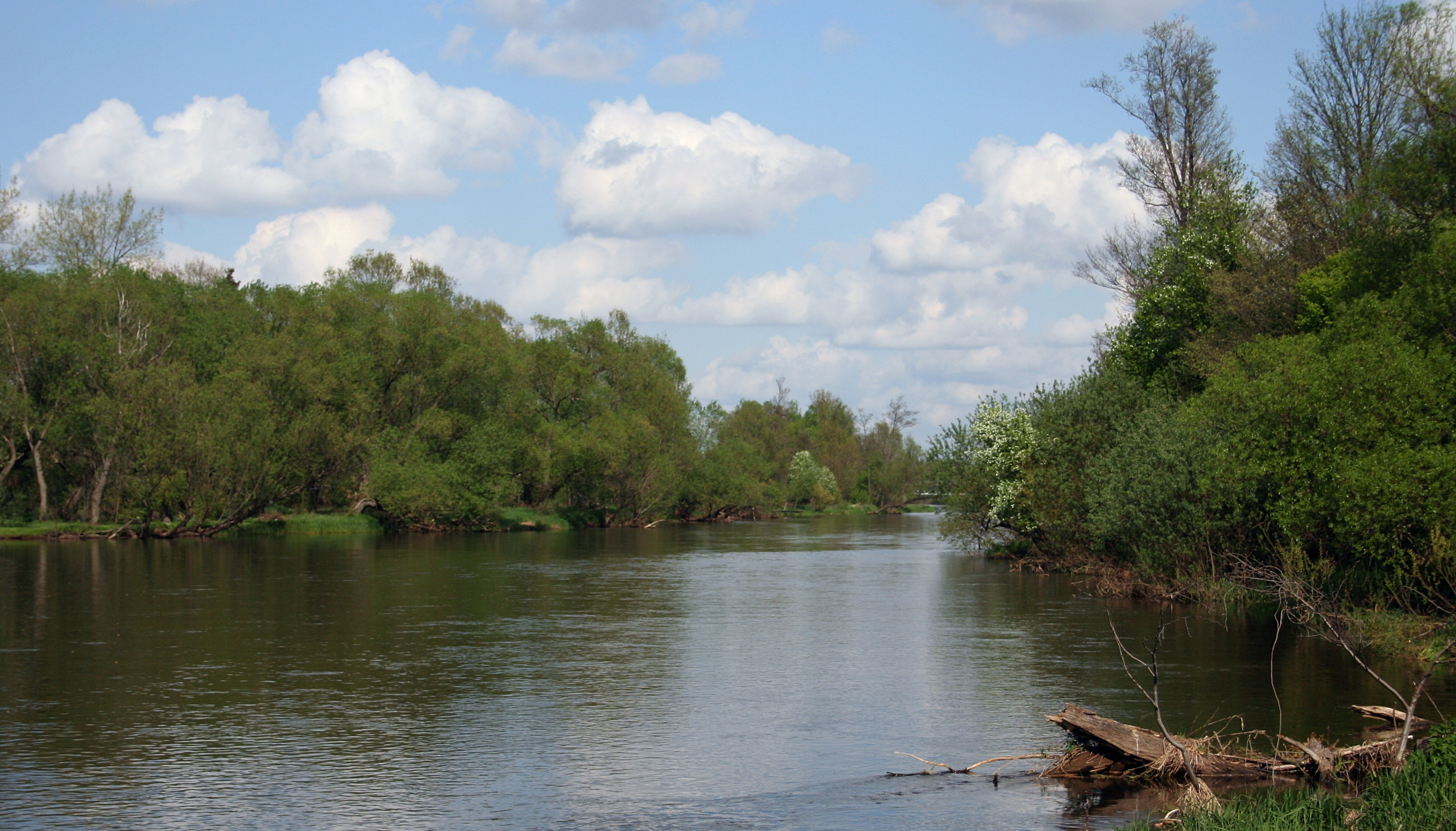
- Warta River near the village of Bobrowniki
- Interactive map of Załęcze Landscape Park
- Location: central Poland

Załęcze Landscape Park (Załęczański Park Krajobrazowy) is a protected area (Landscape Park) in central Poland.

The Park is shared between three voivodeships: Łódź Voivodeship, Opole Voivodeship and Silesian Voivodeship.
