= Stawki Landscape Park =

Protected area in Silesian Voivodeship, Poland

Coordinates: 50.7925°N 19.4600°E

- Park Krajobrazowy Stawki
- IUCN category V (protected landscape/seascape)
- Interactive map of Stawki Landscape Park
- Location: Silesian Voivodeship
- Area: 17.32 km^{2} (6.69 sq mi)
- Established: 1982

Stawki Landscape Park (Park Krajobrazowy Stawki) is a protected area (Landscape Park) in southern Poland, established in 1982, covering an area of 17.32 square kilometres (6.69 sq mi).

The Park lies within Silesian Voivodeship.

A characteristic feature of the park is the presence of numerous streams, ponds and swamps. In these conditions, alder, low hornbeam and riparian forests developed. The most valuable forest areas are under protection as the Wielki Las nature reserve.

In addition to forests, peat bogs and mid-forest meadows have developed in the park. Some of the most interesting plants found in this area include: yellow iris, impatiens cress, lilac, juniper clubmoss, white thornbuckle, forest nest, mountain abacus.

Due to the humid areas and favorable living environment in the park, there are such animals as: marsh harrier, black stork, crane, newt, common toad, sand lizard, live lizard, slow worm.
