= Wieprzów Tarnawacki =

- Village
- Location within Poland
- Coordinates: 50°30′N 23°26′E
- Country: Poland
- Voivodeship: Lublin
- County: Tomaszów
- Gmina: Tarnawatka

Wieprzów Tarnawacki [ˈvjɛpʂuf tarnaˈvat͡ski] is a village in the administrative district of Gmina Tarnawatka, within Tomaszów County, Lublin Voivodeship, in eastern Poland.
