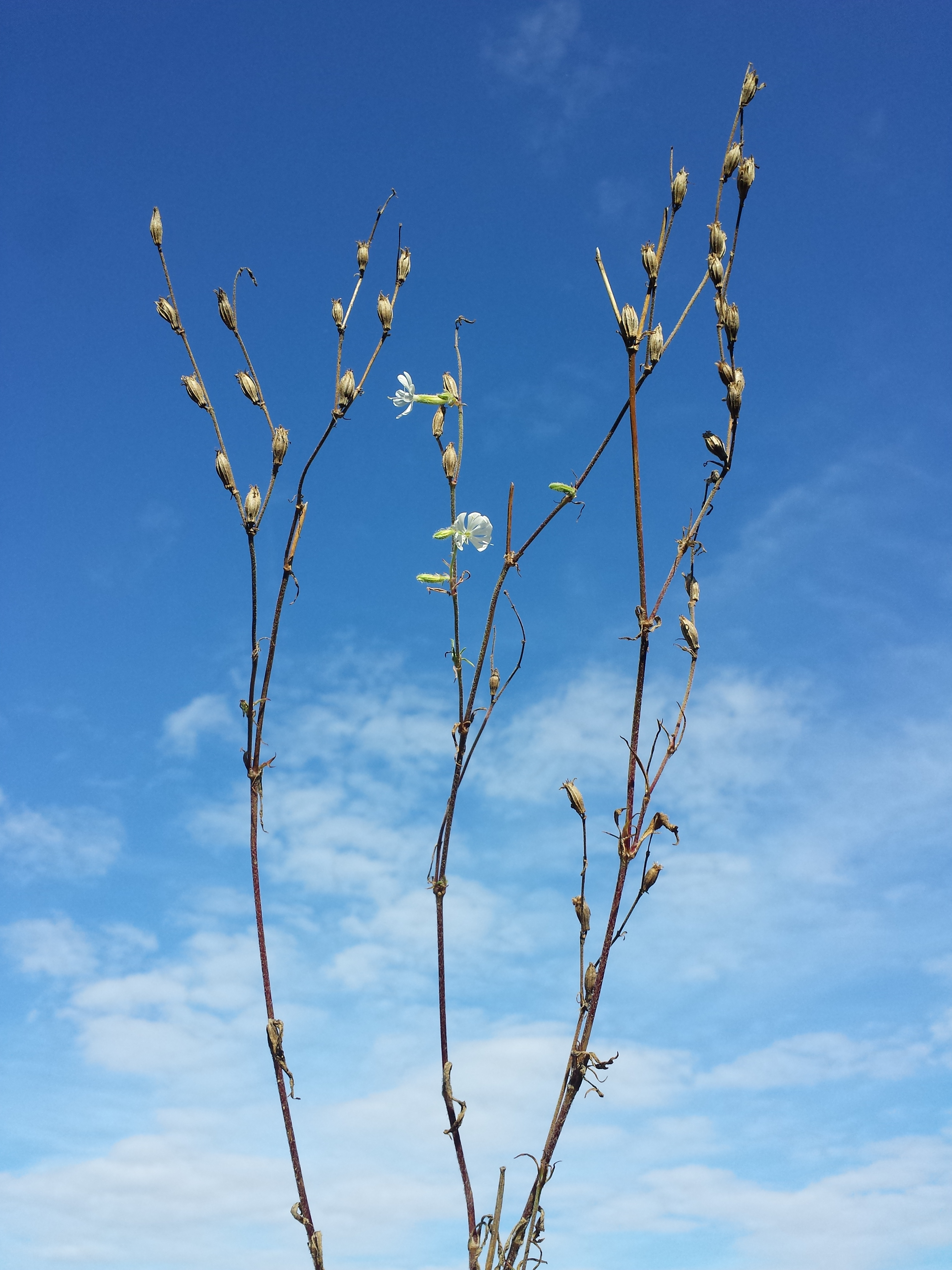
- Silene dichotoma
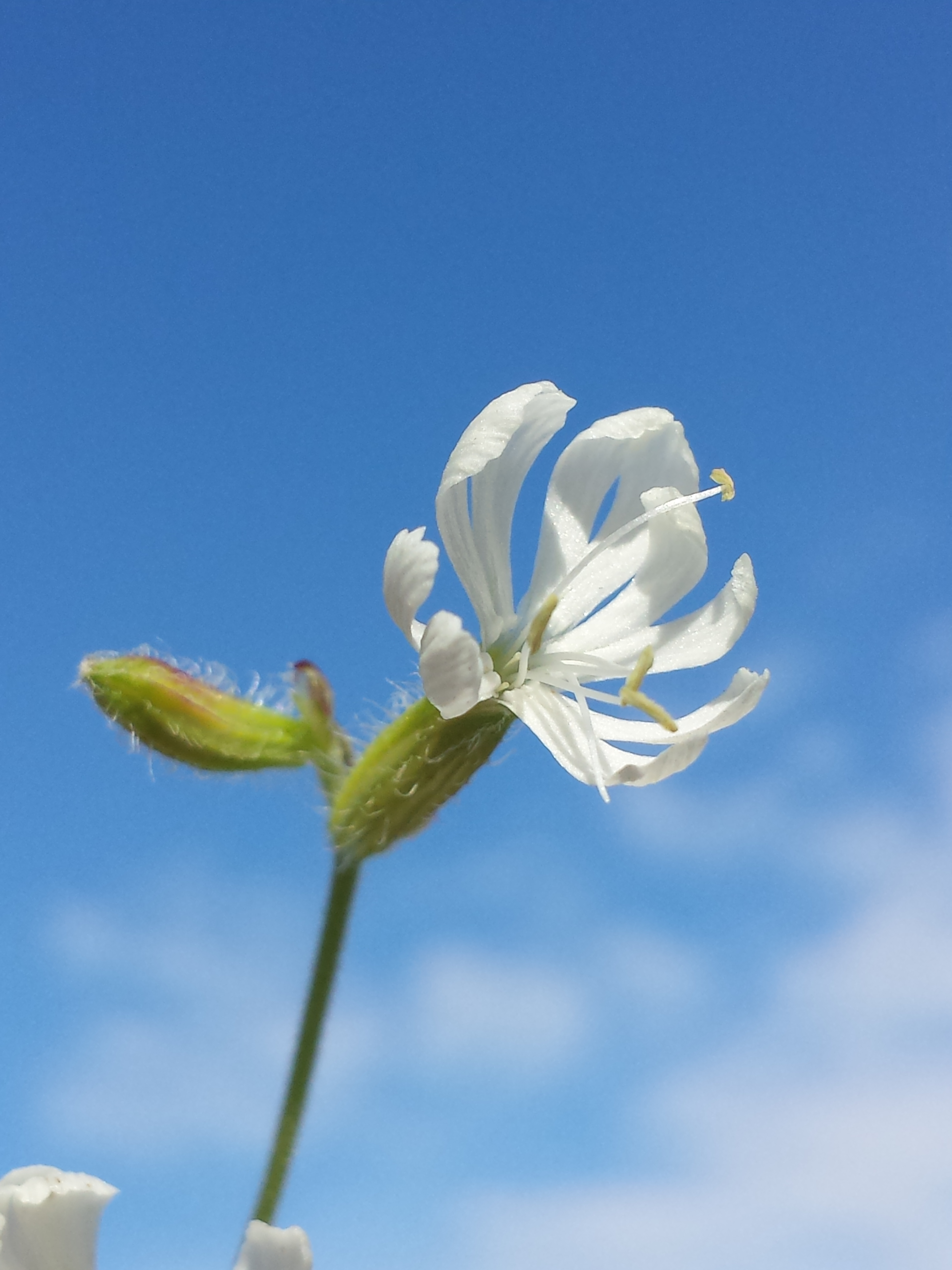
- Flowers, showing hairs on calyx

Scientific classification
- Kingdom: Plantae
- Clade: Tracheophytes
- Clade: Angiosperms
- Clade: Eudicots
- Order: Caryophyllales
- Family: Caryophyllaceae
- Genus: Silene
- Species: S. dichotoma

Binomial name
- Silene dichotoma Ehrh.

= Silene dichotoma =

Species of flowering plant

Silene dichotoma is a species of flowering plant in the family Caryophyllaceae known by the common name forked catchfly. It is native to Eurasia and it is known in other parts of the temperate world, such as sections of North America, where it is a weed that grows in disturbed habitat. It is an annual herb growing up to 80 centimeters tall. The lance-shaped leaves are up to 8 centimeters long on the lower stem and are smaller higher up. Each flower is encapsulated in an inflated calyx of sepals lined with ten veins. It is open at the tip, revealing five white to red petals, each with two lobes and sometimes taking a curled form.
