= Landscape park (protected area) =

Designation for protected areas in some countries

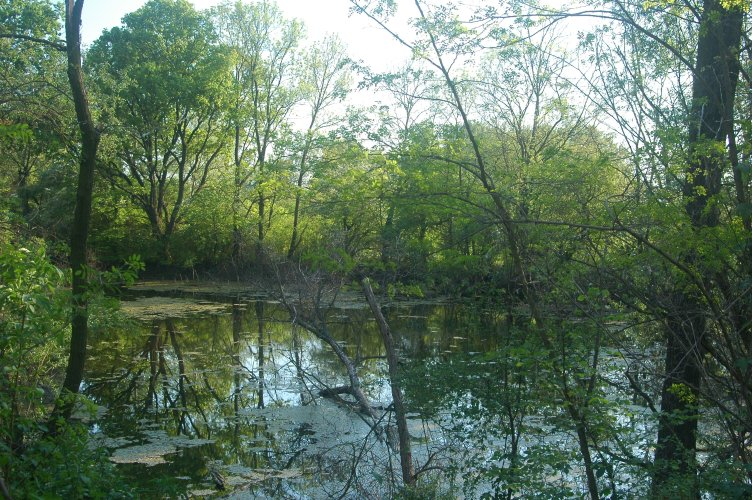
Wetlands alongside the Morava River in Záhorie Protected Landscape Area (Slovakia).

A landscape park (Czech: chráněná krajinná oblast, abbr. CHKO; Slovak: Chránená krajinná oblasť, abbr. CHKO; Polish: Park Krajobrazowy; Slovene: krajinski park; Ukrainian: регіона́льний ландша́фтний (пейзажний) па́рк, abbr. РЛП; Hungarian: tájvédelmi körzet, abbr. TVK) is a type of protected area in Czech Republic, Poland, Slovakia, Ukraine, Hungary, and Slovenia. It is of lower status than a National Park and with less stringent restrictions on development and economic use (usually IUCN Category V).

Landscape parks are environment-protected recreational institutions of local or regional status that are created with the goal of conservation in natural state typical or unique natural complexes and objects as well as providing the conditions for organized recreation for the population.

Landscape parks are organized with withdrawal or without withdrawal of land plots, water, and other natural objects from their owners or users.

In the event when the withdrawal of land plots, water, and other natural objects is necessary for the needs of the regional landscape parks, it is conducted in order established by the legislation of the specific country.

Landscape parks relies the implementation of such objectives:

- conservation of valuable natural and historical-cultural complexes and objects;
- creating conditions for effective tourism, recreation, and other types of outdoor activities in natural conditions in compliance with the regime of protection of preserved natural complexes and objects;
- promoting environmental education work.

== Czech Republic ==
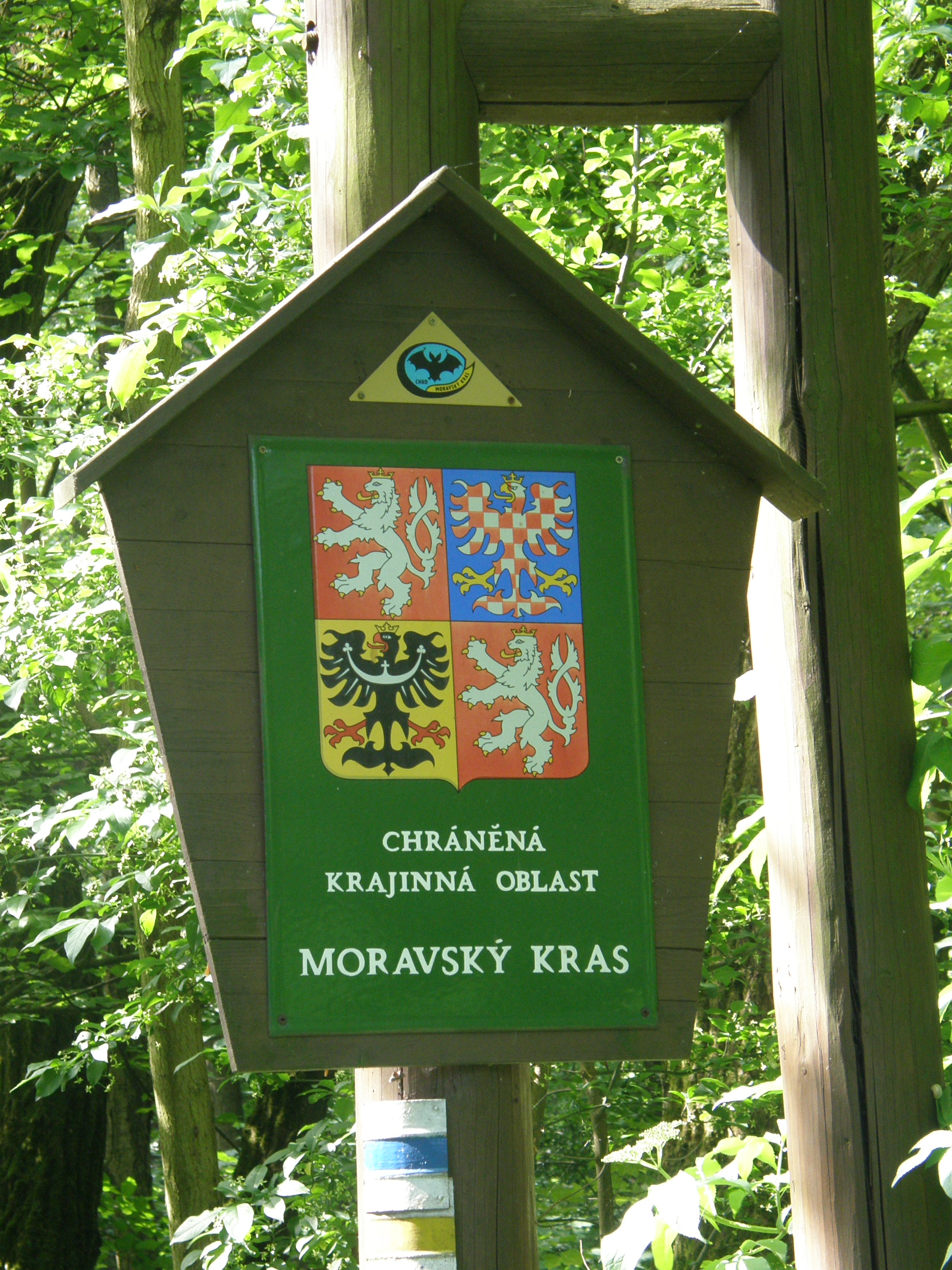
Border mark of the Moravian Karst Protected Landscape Park (Czech Republic)

Protected Landscape Area (abbreviated as PLA; Czech: chráněná krajinná oblast, abbreviated as CHKO) is a large area of harmonic landscape with a typical relief, with a considerable share of natural forest and permanent grassy ecosystems, there can also be preserved human settlement monuments (such as log cabins etc.). As of 2023 there were 26 protected landscape areas in the Czech Republic of approximately 10,850 square kilometres (4,000 sq mi). See Protected Landscape Parks of the Czech Republic.

== Poland ==
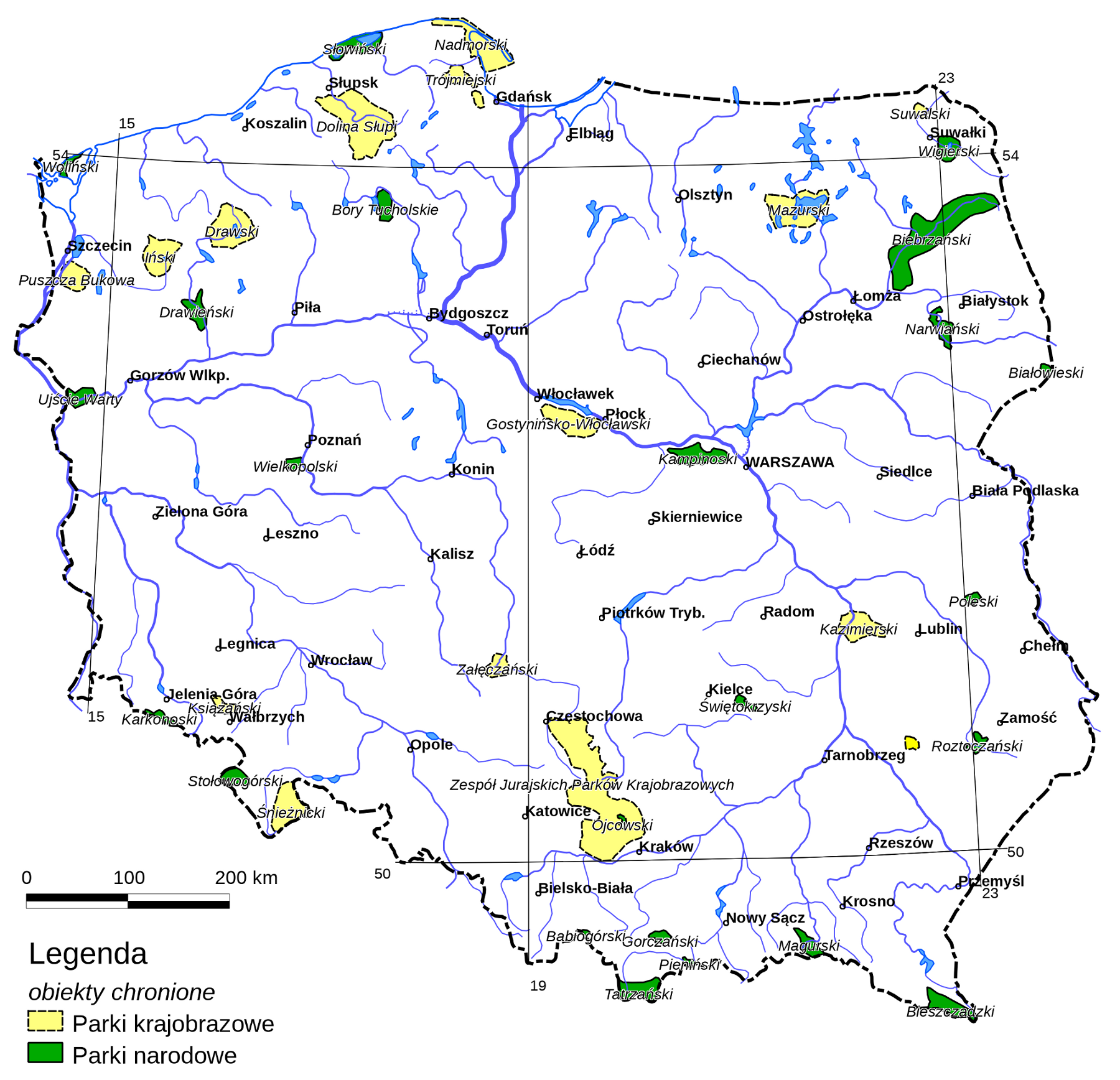
Map of selected large-scale landscape parks in Poland marked in yellow (green, are the national parks.

According to the Act on Protection of Nature (Ustawa o ochronie przyrody) of 2004, a Landscape Park is defined as "an area protected because of its natural, historical, cultural, and scenic values, for the purpose of conserving and popularizing those values in conditions of balanced development."

Decisions on the creation, liquidation, and boundaries of Landscape Parks are taken by resolution of the provincial assembly (voivodeship sejmik). A decision to create a Landscape Park must be preceded by consultation with the council of any relevant gmina (municipality) and with the Regional Director of Nature Protection. A buffer zone (otulina) may be designated in addition to the area of the Park itself.

As at 9 May 2009 there are 122 designated Landscape Parks throughout Poland, covering a total area of approximately 26,100 square kilometres (10,000 sq mi). For a listing, see list of Landscape Parks of Poland.

== Slovakia ==
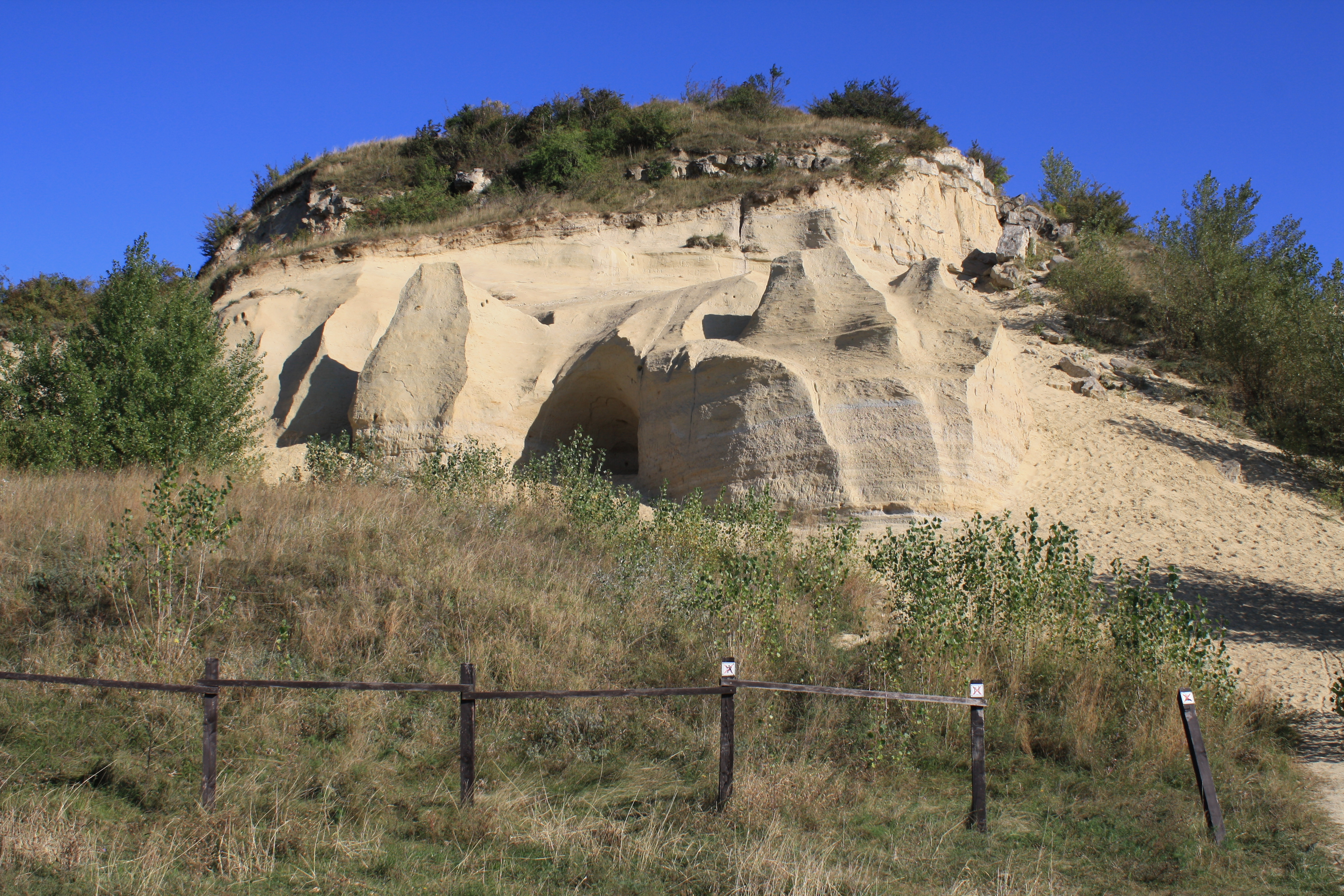
Sandberg near Bratislava in Little Carpathians Protected Landscape Area in Slovakia

There are 14 Protected Landscape Areas in Slovakia (in 2013). Protected Landscape Area (PLA) is in Slovakia a larger area, usually more than 1,000 ha, with fragmented ecosystems which are significant for the conservation of biological diversity and ecological stability, with characteristic landscape features, or with specific forms of historical settlements. This represents a second level of protection, with a status lower than National Parks have. There are tourist pathways that man can use for hiking or walks. Educational paths are surrounded by tourist signs with various information about the "CHKO" and nature. Protected Landscape Areas in Slovakia cover the area of 610 869 hectares, what is about 12.46% of the whole territory of Slovakia.

== Ukraine ==
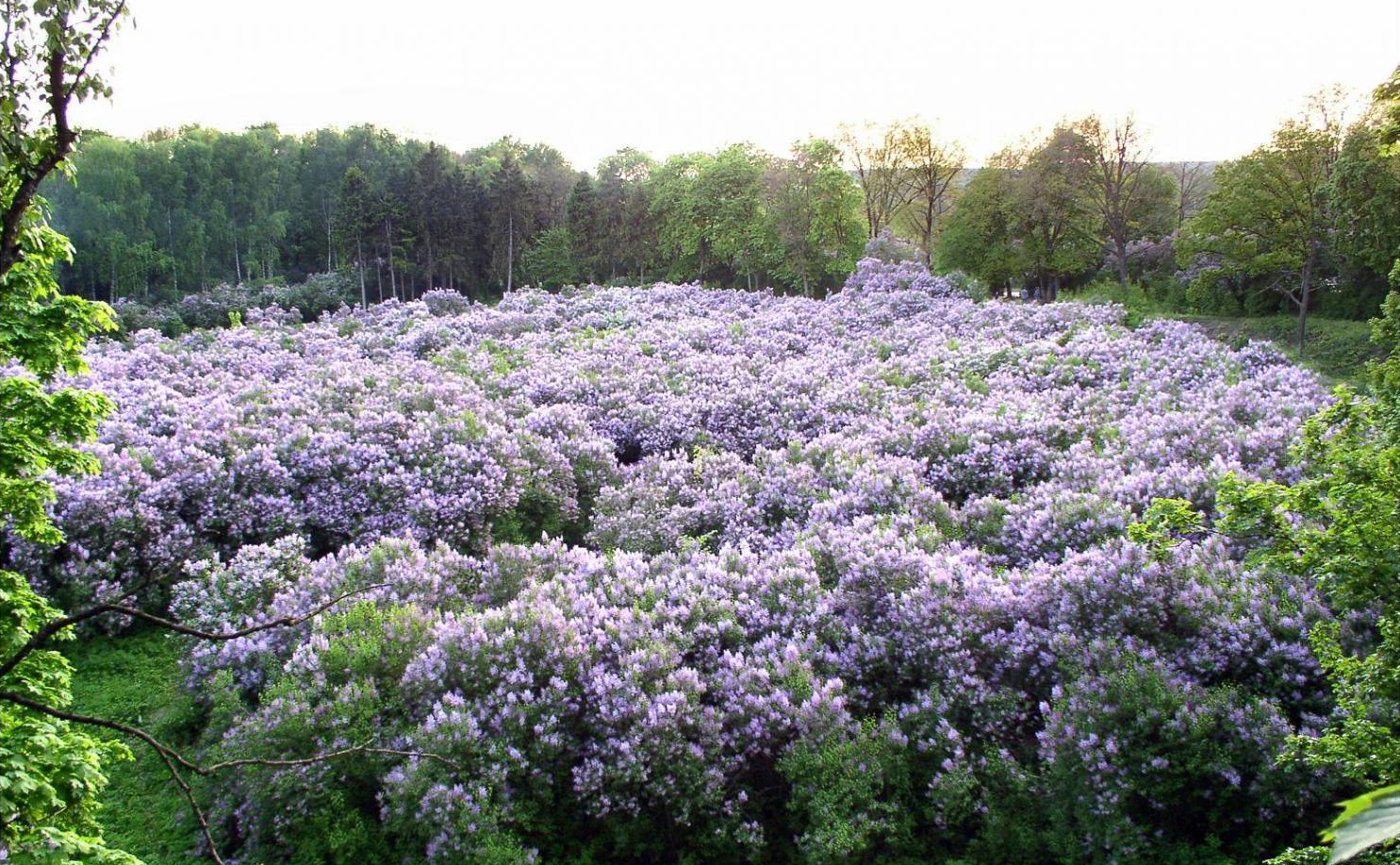
Lilac Grove in Dikanka. The former estate of Prince Kochubey. Laid down in the early 19th century. Regional Landscape Park «Dykanskyy»

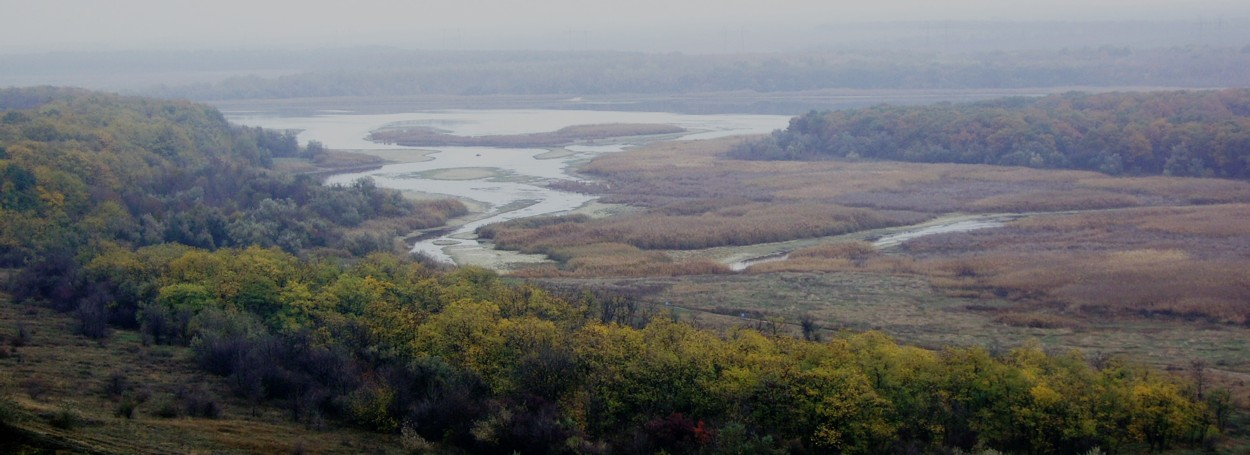
Regional Landscape Park «Kleban-Byk». Kleban-Bytske water basin.

In Ukraine Regional landscape parks are environment-protected recreational institutions of local or regional status that are created with the goal of conservation in natural state typical or unique natural complexes and objects as well as providing the conditions for organized recreation for the population. Regional landscape parks are organized with withdrawal or without withdrawal of land plots, water, and other natural objects from their owners or users. In the event when the withdrawal of land plots, water, and other natural objects is necessary for the needs of the regional landscape parks, it is conducted in order established by the legislation of Ukraine.

In 2016 in Ukraine there are 54 regional landscape parks.

== See also ==
- Protected areas of the Czech Republic
- Protected areas of Poland
- Protected areas of Slovakia
- Protected areas of Slovenia
- Protected areas of Ukraine
- Protected areas of Hungary
