= Lomnitz =

Lomnitz may refer to:

== People ==
- Cinna Lomnitz (1925–2016), Chilean-Mexican geophysicist
- Claudio Lomnitz, Mexican professor of Anthropology
- Larissa Adler Lomnitz (1932-2019), French-born Chilean-Mexican social anthropologist, researcher, professor, and academic

== Places ==
- Lomnitz, the German name of some inhabited places:
  - Lomnice (disambiguation) (Czech language)
  - Łomnica (disambiguation) (Polish language)
