= Pstrąże =

- Abandoned village
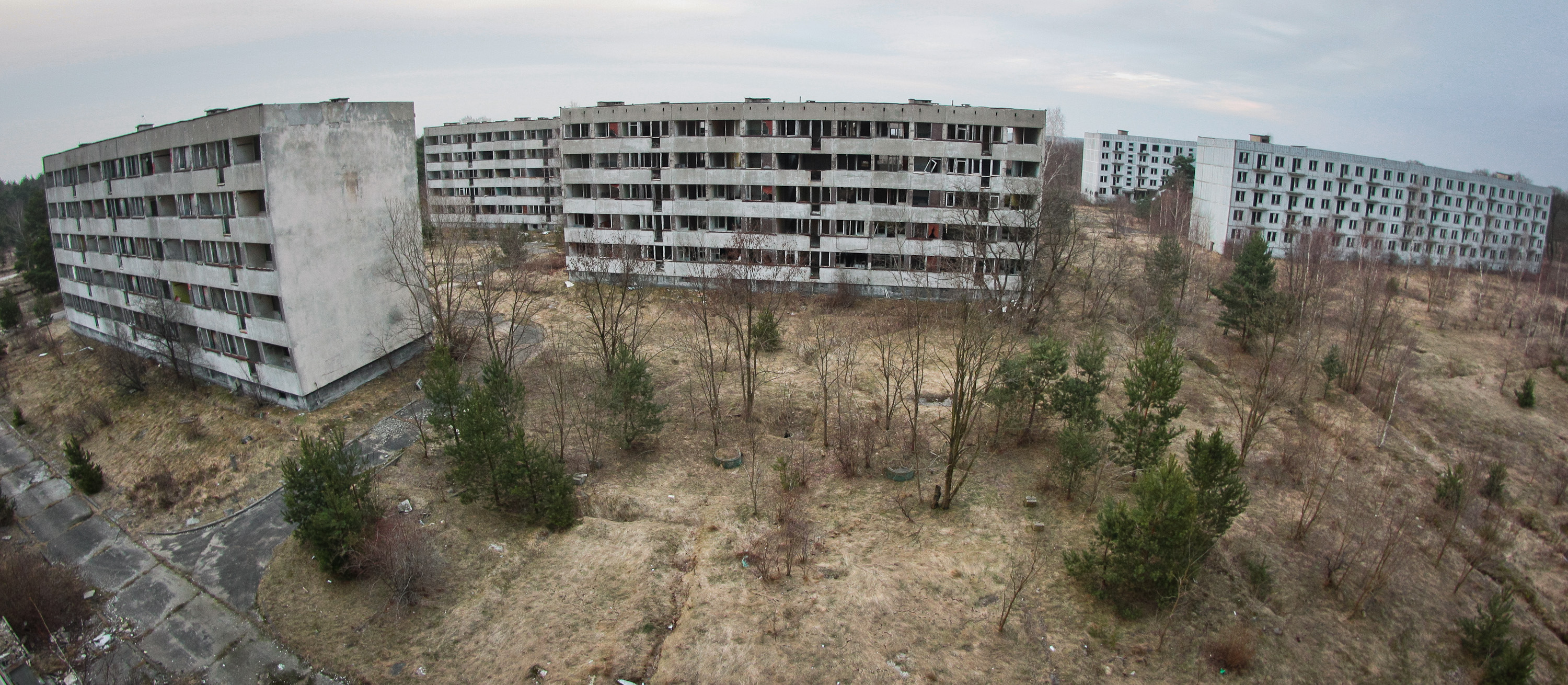
- Abandoned buildings in Pstrąże

- Location within Poland
- Coordinates: 51°26′23″N 15°34′29″E
- Country: Poland
- Voivodeship: Lower Silesian
- County: Bolesławiec
- First mention: 1305
- Abandoned: 1992

Population (Before 1992)
  - Total: ≤15,000
- Time zone: UTC+1 (CET)
  - Summer (DST): UTC+2 (CEST)
- Vehicle registration: DBL

Pstrąże ([ˈpstrɔ̃.ʐɛ]; German: Pstransse; Russian: Страхув) is a village in Poland that is currently abandoned, located in Gmina Bolesławiec, Bolesławiec County, of the Lower Silesian Voivodeship. The village is placed 20 km (12 mi) from the city of Bolesławiec. The Bóbr river runs through the village. From 1975 till 1998, Pstrąże was located in the Jelenia Góra Voivodeship.

Dubbed the "Polish Chernobyl" due to its ghost town status and alleged nuclear history, previously known as the "Little Soviet Union", Pstrąże became a popular destination for adventurers, scrap collectors and thieves. It has also been called the "Polish Pripyat" and the "Phantom Town". In 2016, demolition of Pstrąże's former Soviet garrison buildings began. After the signing of the Poland – United States Enhanced Defense Cooperation Agreement in 2019 and especially after Russia's attack on Ukraine in 2022, preparations and construction of a garrison for US troops began.

== Names ==
The Polish historical and present-day name is Pstrąże, as well as the Germanised variant Pstransse. Between 1933 and 1945, during the reign of Adolf Hitler in Nazi Germany, it held the name Strans. Throughout the period when the Soviet Army was stationed there, the village was named Strachów in Polish and Страхув (Strakhuv) in Russian.

== History ==
=== Origins ===
The first mention of Pstrąże comes from the year 1305, when it belonged to the estate of the Kliczkowskis and its name was recorded as Pstransse. It is estimated that at the turn of the 15th and 16th centuries, a small defensive castle stood here. In 1865, many of the village's structures were destroyed by a fire. Until the end of the 19th century, inhabitants of Pstrąże made a living by grazing cattle and sheep as well as smelting iron.

=== Two World Wars ===
In 1901, due to the creation of a proving ground in Świętoszów (then Neuhammer am Queis in the German Empire), renovation and reconstruction efforts to turn the village into a place of use for the German Imperial Army began. Military barracks and stables were built, a railway siding was connected from Leszno Górne, and a concrete bridge over the river Bóbr was constructed. After World War I, the stables were converted into garages.

Toward the end of World War II, during the retreat of the Wehrmacht, the old bridge was blown up to prevent Soviet armies from pushing onward. Pstrąże, or Strans as it was known in German at the time, was captured by the Red Army on 10 February 1945. The place was initially inaccessible to Poles even after the forced resettlement of Polish families from the former Polish territories in the east, since, to make the movement of Polish civilians in the military area more difficult, the road section of the bridge had not been rebuilt.

From that point, Pstrąże was not officially listed on the maps. The military part of the city was separated from the civilian part by a wall. Everything inside the military section was kept top secret. Urban legends as well as assumptions based on partial evidence have it that the Soviet troops kept nuclear weapons in the secret section of the village. The military part was fully equipped with hangars and garages for trucks, whereas the civilian district had many amenities of a normal town: not only residential tower blocks, but also shops, a school, a cinema, a theatre, etc.

=== Little Soviet Union ===
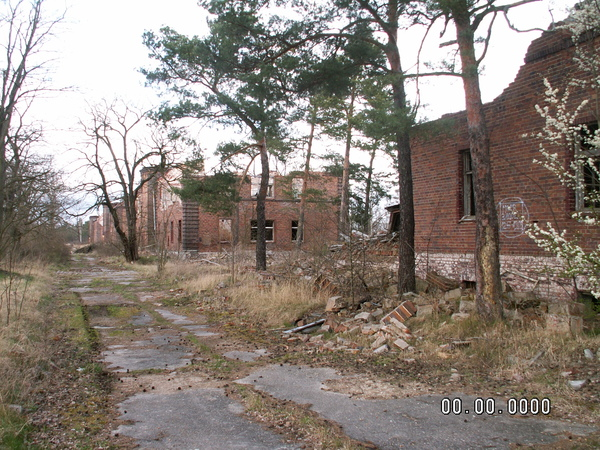
Some of the barracks

It was mostly the following units that were stationed in Pstrąże, which became known as Strachów during the years of the Polish People's Republic, when Poland was a satellite state of the Soviet Union:

- 14th Heavy Artillery Brigade of the Polish People's Army (from 1948 till 1951)
- 510th Independent Training Tank Regiment (JW 74858) (in July 1989 transferred to Kamenka in Leningrad Oblast)
- 76th Orsha Tank Regiment (JW 52801) (partly, from July 1989 to 1991, earlier in Świętoszów)
- 255th Mechanised Regiment of the Guards (JW 61412) (on 30 October 1982 transferred to Volgograd)
- 144th Mechanised Regiment (JW 61412) (from 30 October 1982 until 1992)
- 27th Mobile Missile and Technical Base (JW 81859) (until 1990)
- 8th Orsha Guard Tank Regiment (unknown period)
- Independent Repair Battalion, subordinate to command in Legnica (Military Unit 31728) (in the years 1989–1991)

Despite Strachów's relatively secret status as a zone of strategic importance, and it being surrounded by barbed wire fences and guard dogs, trade between Soviet soldiers and Polish locals bloomed. It became known in Polish as Mały Związek Radziecki (Little Soviet Union). Poles entered side passages and used the village shops; small chocolate sweets were reportedly in great demand, as well as fuel that was cheaper and of higher quality than what was available to Polish citizens at the time, as recalled by locals. Reportedly, over 100 T-72 and T-64 tanks were based in the military area.

=== Ghost town ===
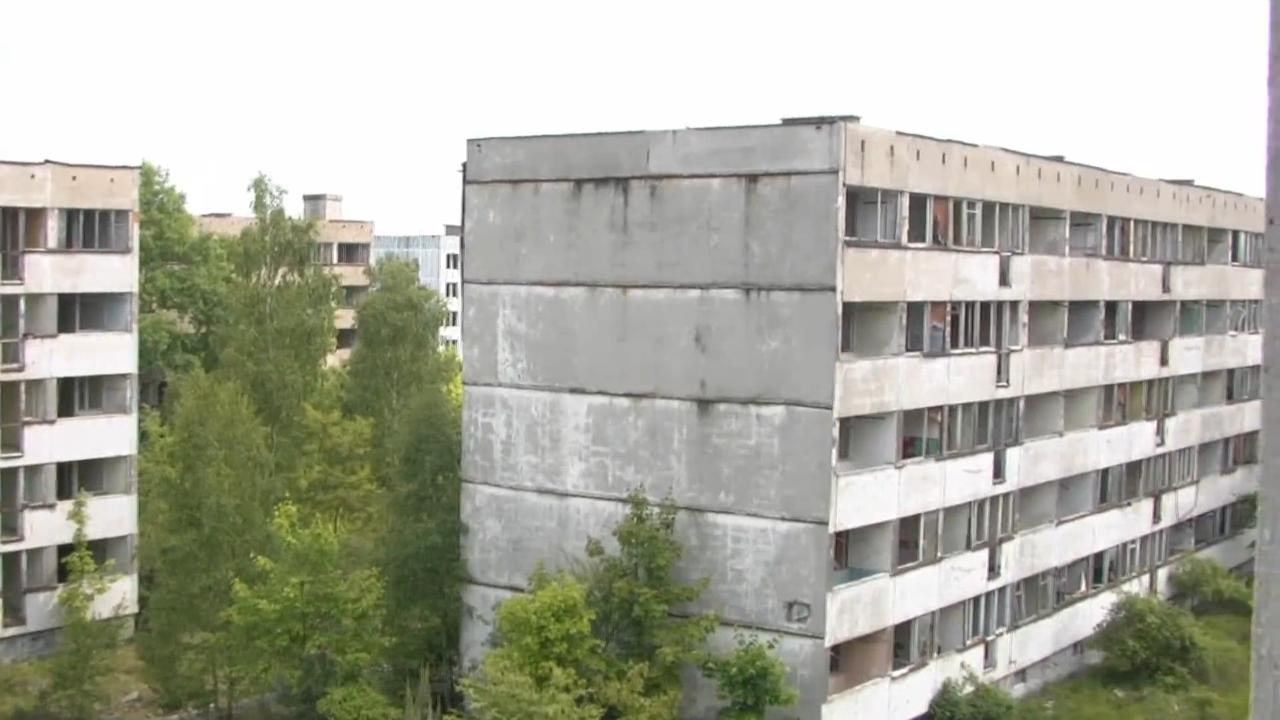
Abandoned residential tower blocks

Until 1992, the town was occupied by the Soviet Army. Russia continued to consider it an object of strategic importance and did not officially hand it over to Polish authorities until 1994. Over 10,000 soldiers with their families lived here before it became a ghost town, with the total number of inhabitants potentially reaching up to 15,000 people. After Russian troops had completely left the village, the Polish Army began guarding the town on 10 April 1993 to secure the property for purposes of later settlement. In 1995, following the decision of the Head of the District Office in Bolesławiec, the settlement plan was abandoned, guarding was cancelled, and the town was incorporated into the proving ground. Skeletons of the buildings were then used by GROM, the special unit of Polish commandos, for military exercises and training. Regular armed forces, the fire brigade, search and rescue, and police also trained here on occasion. However, explorers and looters visited the town and took anything of value.

In October 2016, demolition of the abandoned buildings began and continued through 2017; the local authorities could no longer afford to upkeep the ruined structures, which had become dangerous to the public over time as Pstrąże had become a destination for enthusiasts of urban exploration as well as occasional vagrants. The area is to be eventually levelled, cleaned, and allocated for new investments.

== Infrastructure ==
Before 1992, the military area of the housing estate contained the following facilities: 8 apartment blocks, a preschool, the Eight-Year School No. 53, "Bajka" Cafe, a boiler room, a playground, and a sports ground. Strachów was part of a larger Soviet/PRL military complex that stretched over 21,000 hectares (52,000 acres) of land. It consisted of: barracks for troops with numerous garages and storage areas in Pstrąże, a shelter bunker in the village of Wilkocin, the Przemków-Trzebień proving ground, as well as an ammunition store and residential areas in Trzebień.

In Pstrąże itself, the military barracks area was made up of: houses of the officers' corps, the barracks themselves, checkpoints, a pass office, military detention area, officers' hotel, Eight-Year School No. 53 (later transferred to the estate), a football stadium, open swimming pool, Garrison House of Officers, universal store, smaller shops, warehouses, a boiler room, "Kadet" club, sports hall, ensign school, clubhouse with a library, laundry room, large kitchen building, canteens, two squares with stands, garages of tanks and other military vehicles, workshops, a green area, sports grounds, missile positions, training and staff buildings, "Monograph" Communication Node, a post office, and a health centre.

There were also a farm and a railway siding with a ramp in the village.

The A18 motorway bypasses Pstrąże in the south.

== Monuments ==
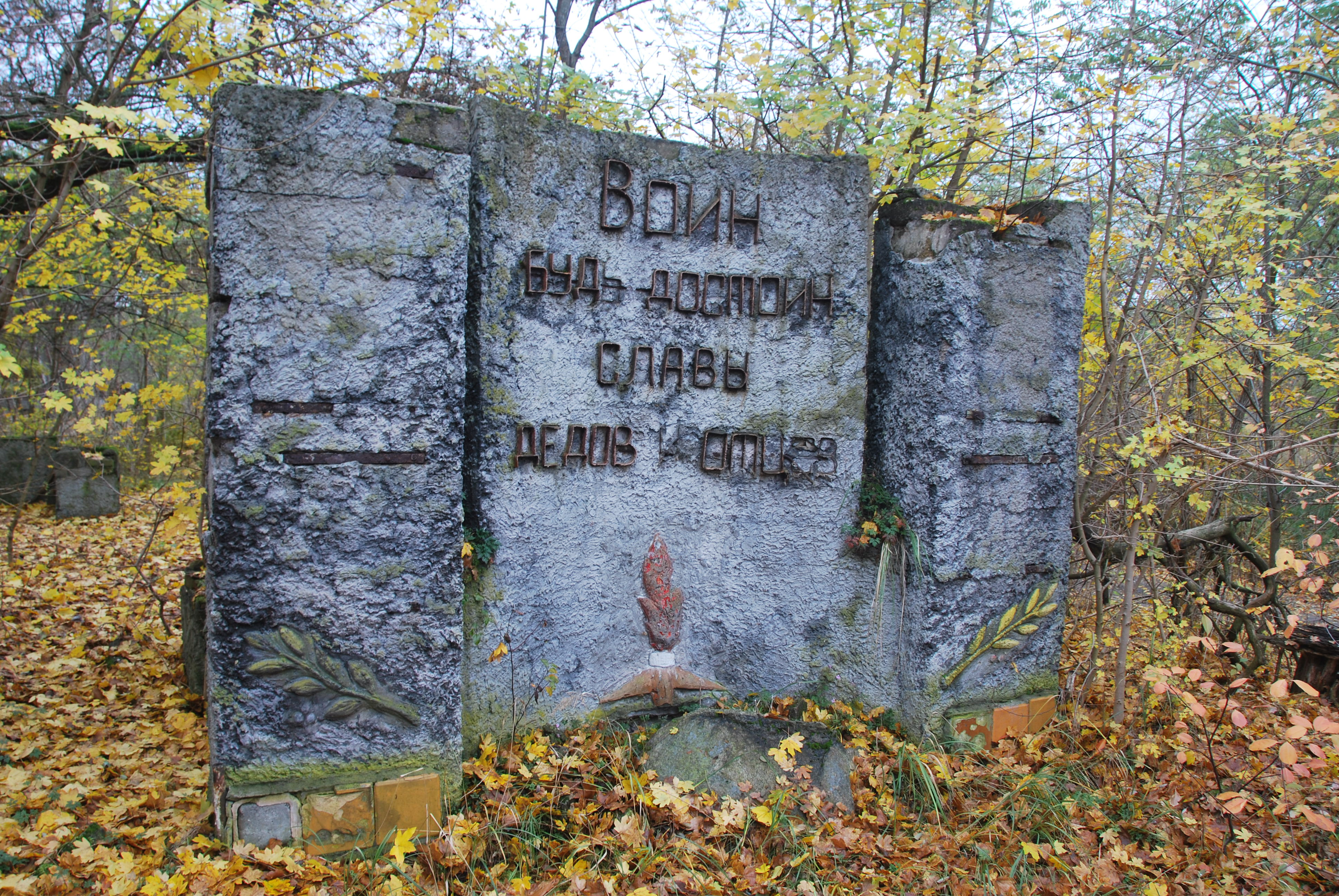
Soviet memorial in Pstrąże

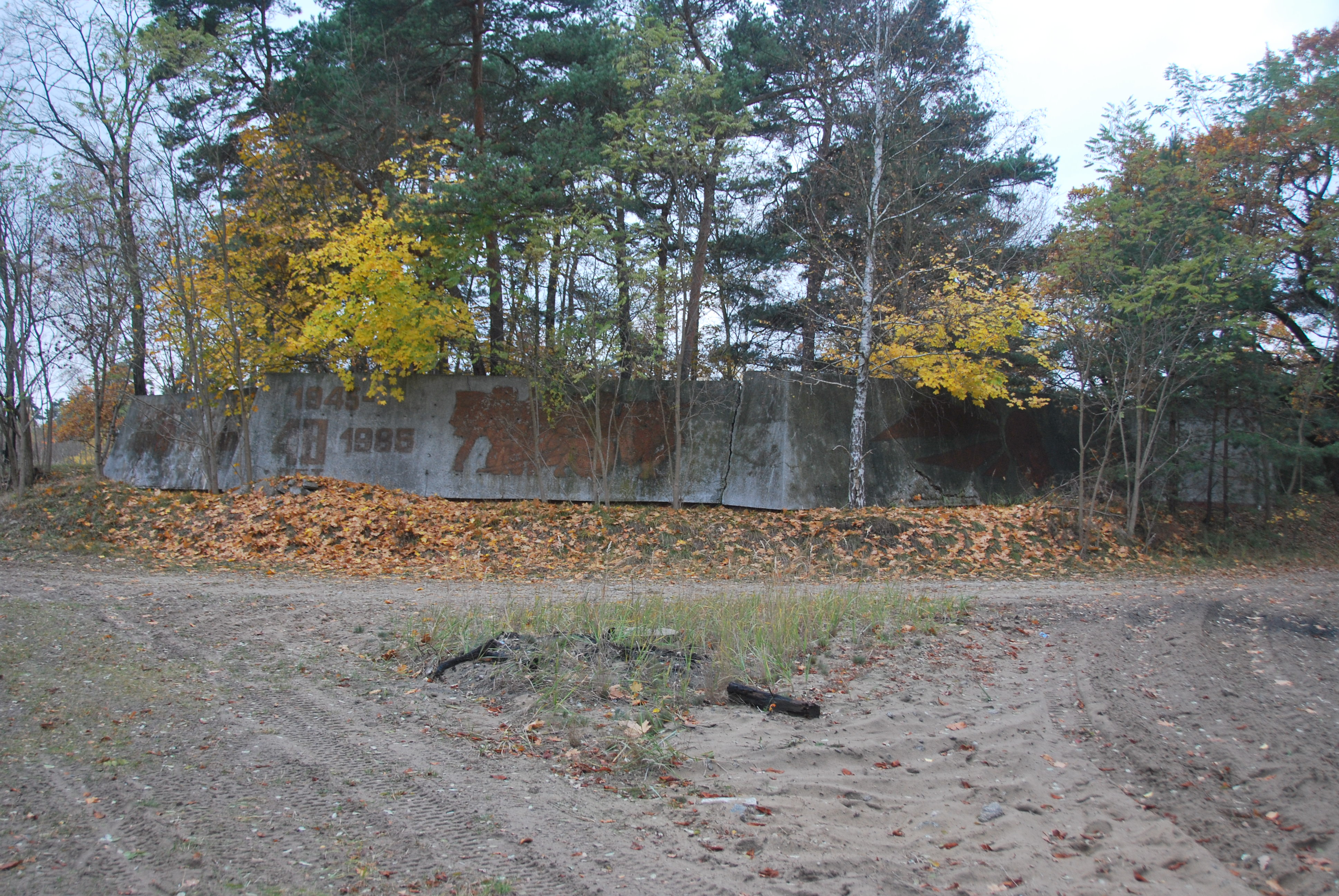
Another war memorial in the village

Two monuments from the Soviet era survived in the village for many years: a monumental plaque and a Victory Monument (with the image of Vladimir Lenin).

On the building of the 1st Company of the 255th Mechanised Regiment of the Guards there was a commemorative plaque with the following text: "1-я рота 255 гв. МСП в Сталинграде пленила фельдмаршала Паулюса" (1st Company of the 255th Mechanised Regiment of the Guards in Stalingrad captured Field Marshal Paulus). The fate of the board today remains unknown.
