= Łąkociny =

Łąkociny may refer to the following places in Poland:

- Łąkociny, Lower Silesian Voivodeship (south-west Poland)
- Łąkociny, Greater Poland Voivodeship (west-central Poland)
