= Łężce, Lower Silesian Voivodeship =

Łężce
- Village
- Location within Poland
- Coordinates: 51°32′17″N 15°48′29″E
- Country: Poland
- Voivodeship: Lower Silesian
- County: Polkowice
- Gmina: Przemków
- Population: 129

Łężce [ˈwɛ̃ʂt͡sɛ] is a village in the administrative district of Gmina Przemków, within Polkowice County, Lower Silesian Voivodeship, in south-western Poland.
