= Szklarki =

- Village
- Location within Poland
- Coordinates: 51°31′19″N 15°45′08″E
- Country: Poland
- Voivodeship: Lower Silesian
- County: Polkowice
- Gmina: Przemków
- Population: 103

Szklarki [ˈʂklarki] is a village in the administrative district of Gmina Przemków, within Polkowice County, Lower Silesian Voivodeship, in south-western Poland.
