= Karpie =

- Village
- Location within Poland
- Coordinates: 51°32′04″N 15°44′05″E
- Country: Poland
- Voivodeship: Lower Silesian
- County: Polkowice
- Gmina: Przemków
- Population: 190

Karpie [ˈkarpjɛ] is a village in the administrative district of Gmina Przemków, within Polkowice County, Lower Silesian Voivodeship, in south-western Poland.
