= Rudawy Landscape Park =

Protected area in Poland

Coordinates: 50.8443°N 15.891°E

- Rudawski Park Krajobrazowy
- IUCN category V (protected landscape/seascape)
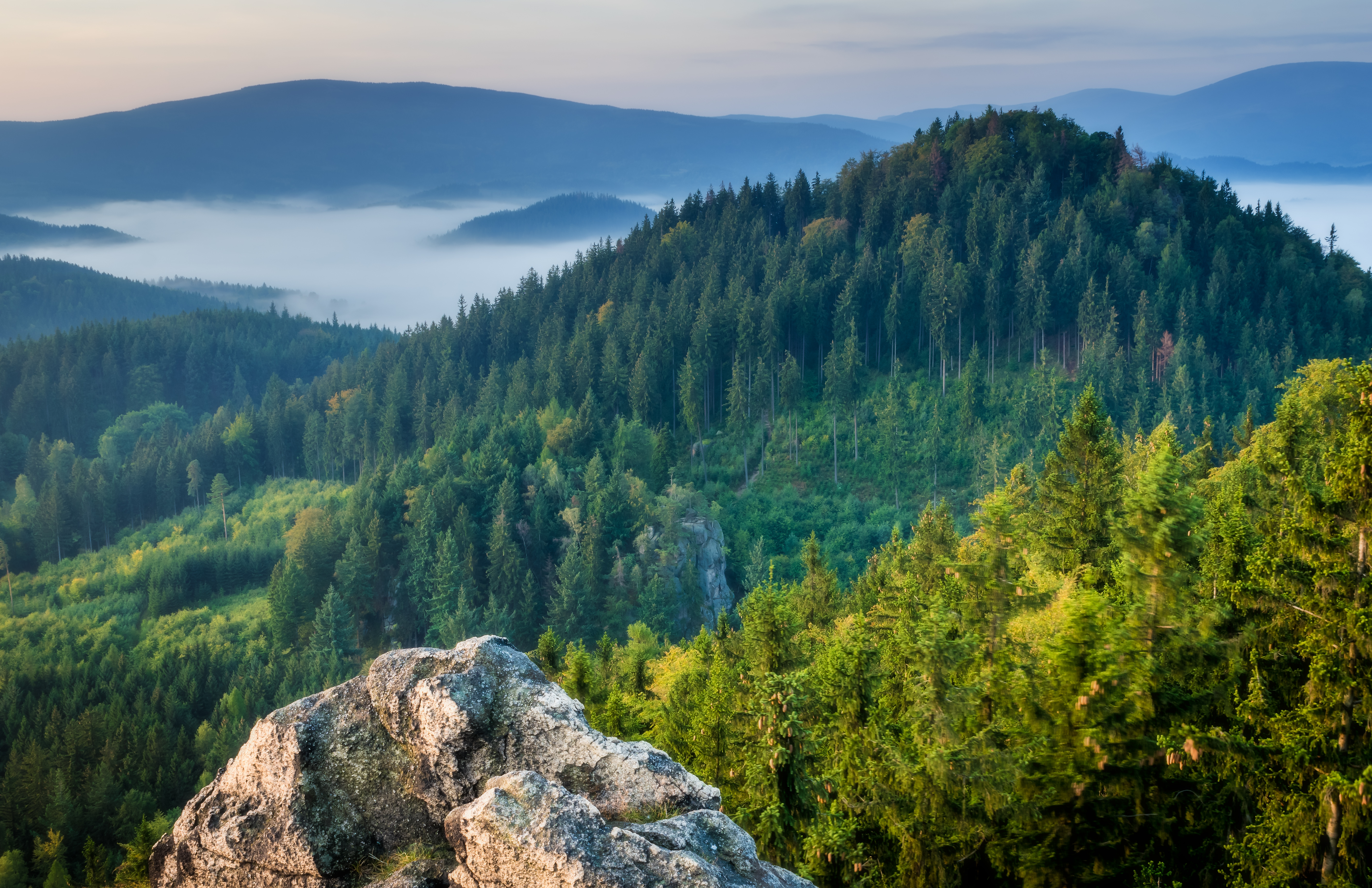
- Morning mist in Rudawy Landscape Park
- Interactive map of Rudawy Landscape Park
- Location: Lower Silesian Voivodeship
- Area: 157 km^{2} (61 sq mi)
- Established: 1989
- Website: Rudawski Park Krajobrazowy (in Polish)

Rudawy Landscape Park (Rudawski Park Krajobrazowy) is a protected area (Landscape Park) in south-western Poland, established in 1989.

The Park lies within Lower Silesian Voivodeship. The Bóbr River flows through the park.

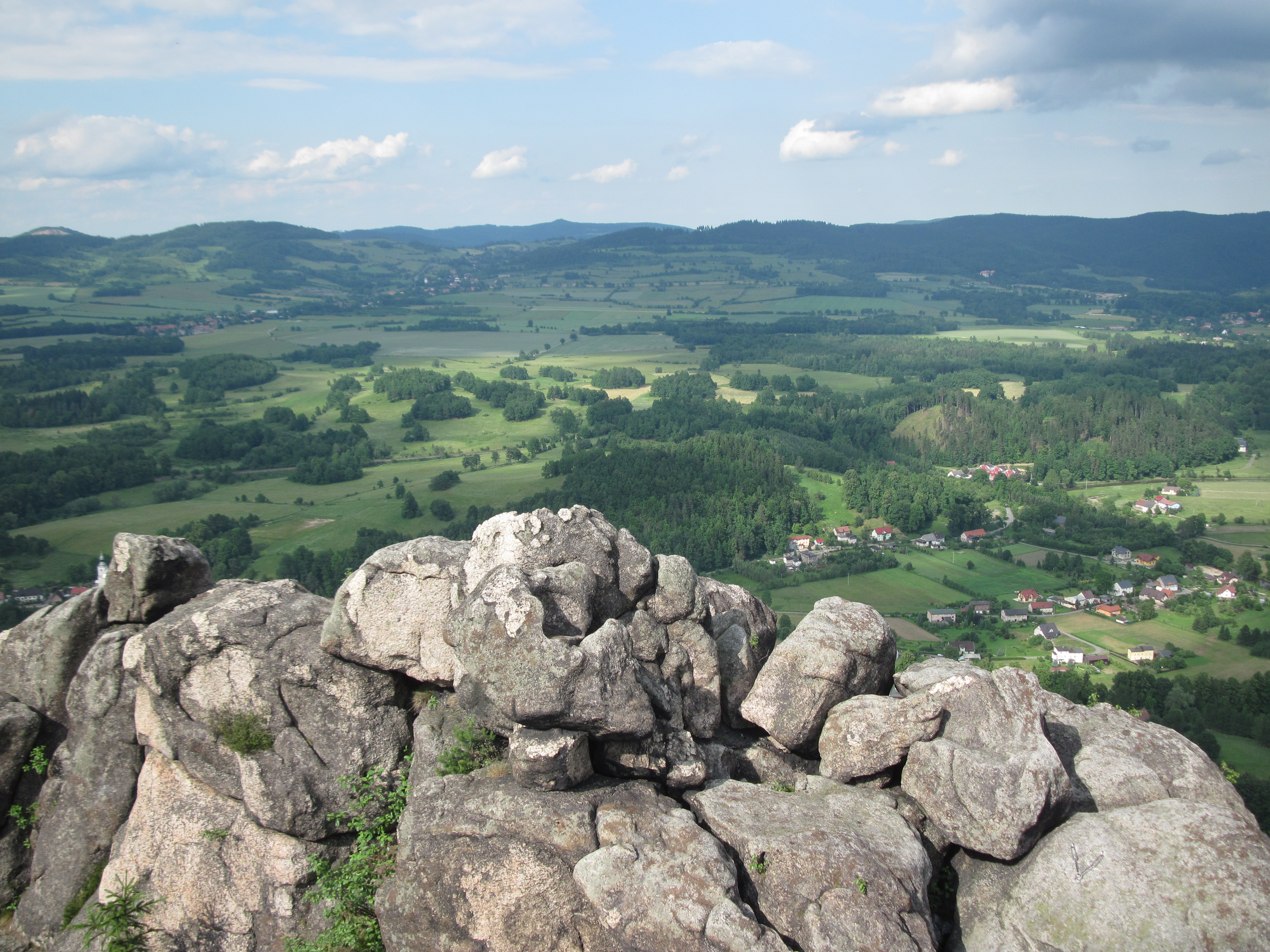

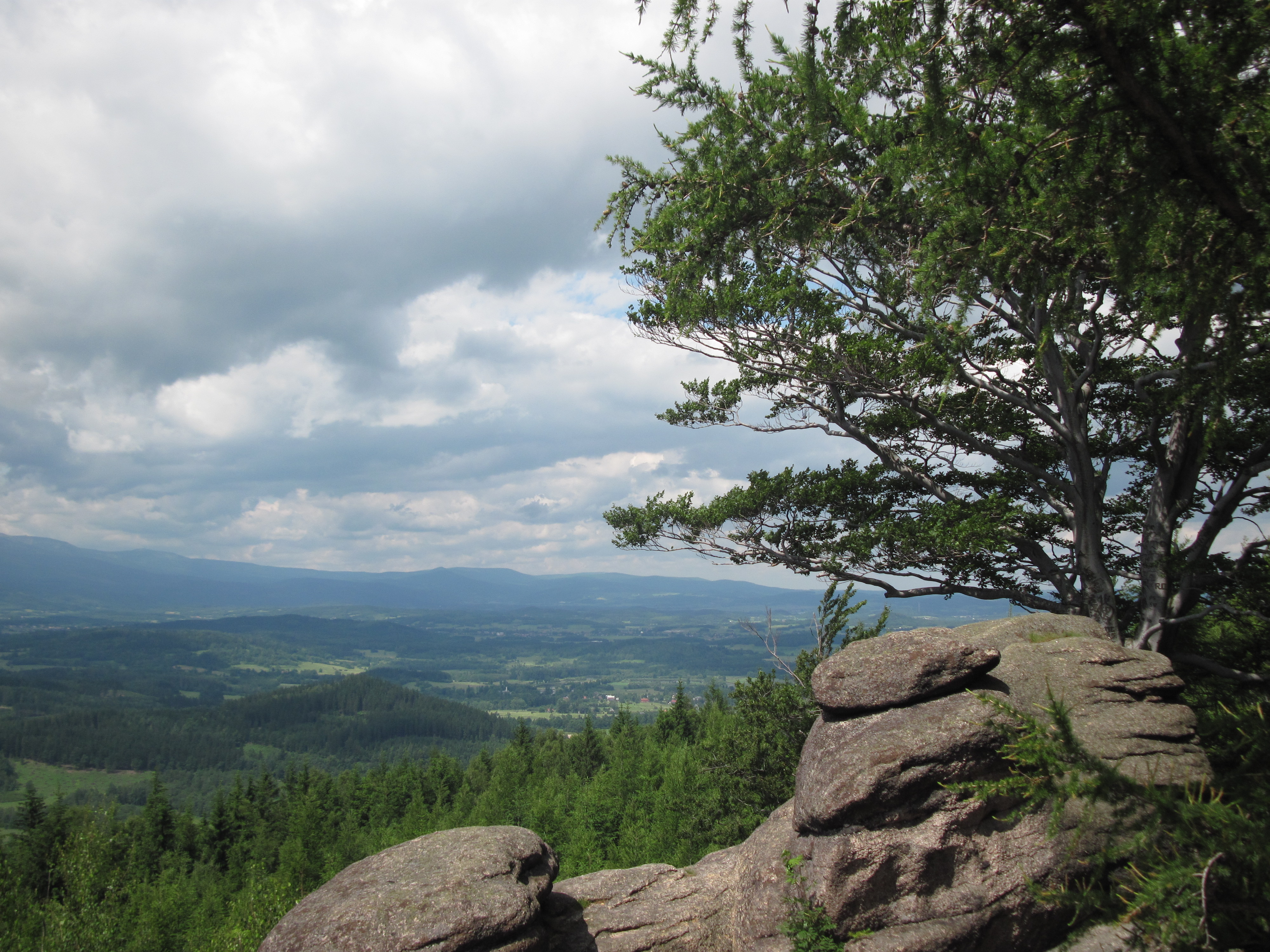

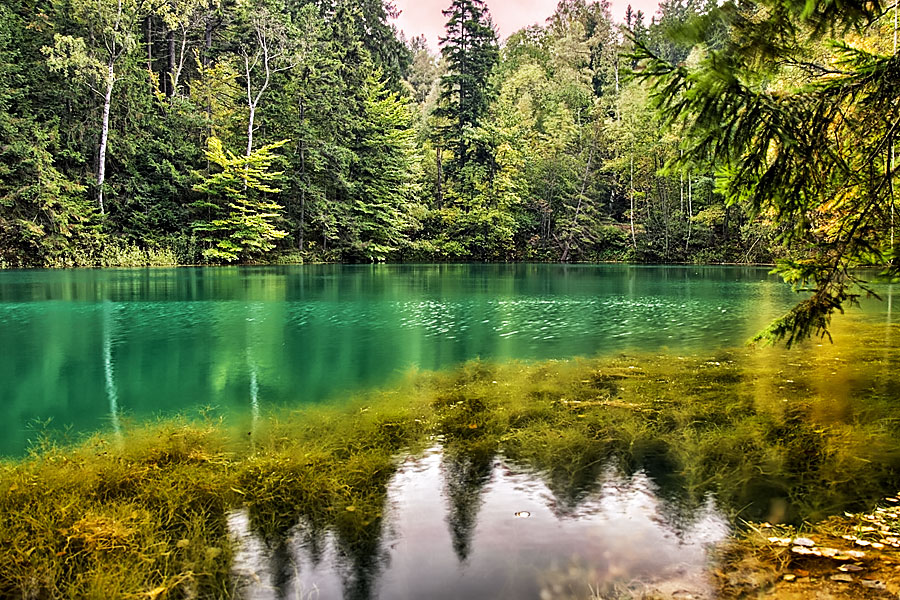
Colourful mineral lakes

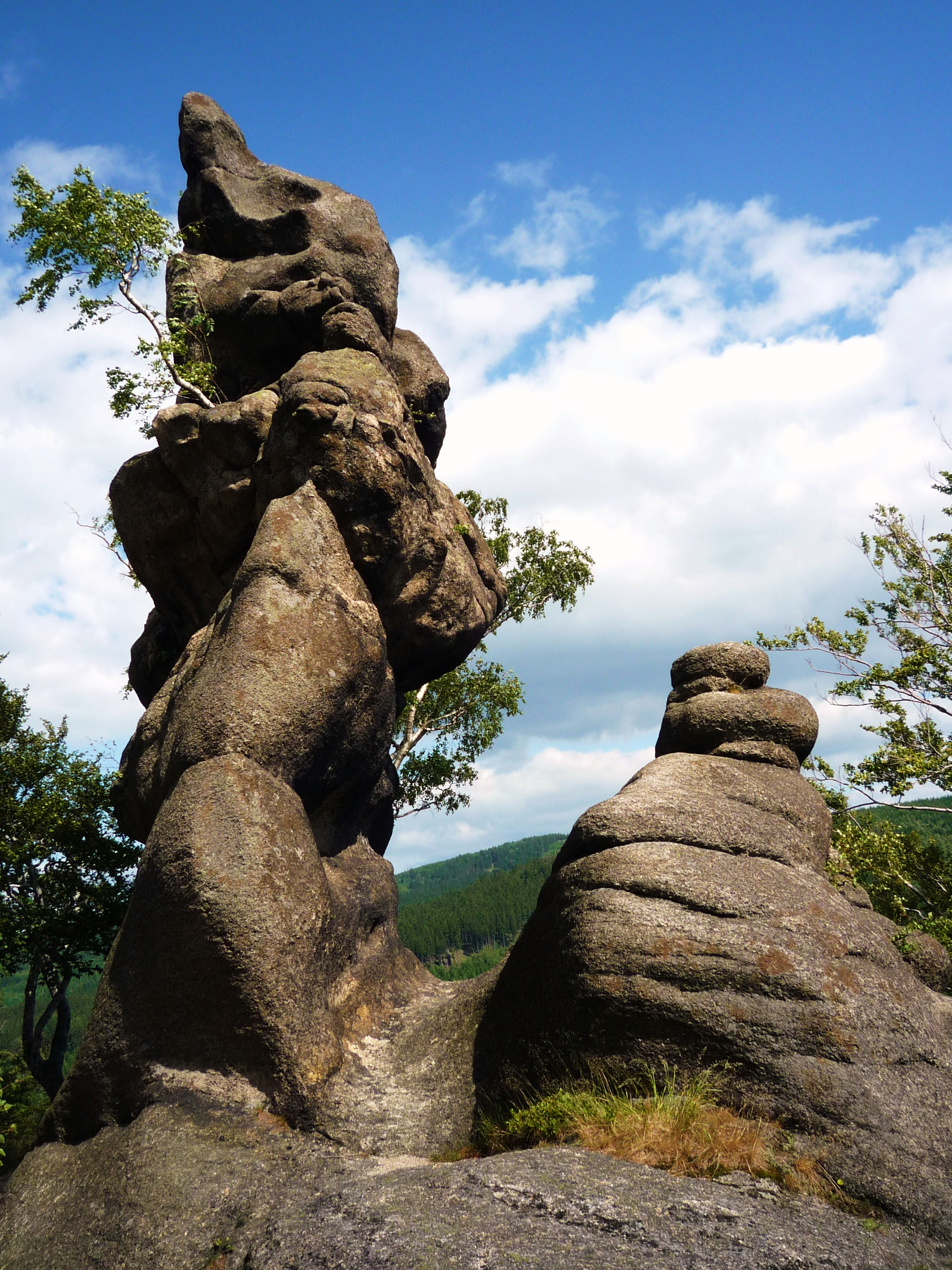
Strange sandstone erosions (Igła, The Needle)

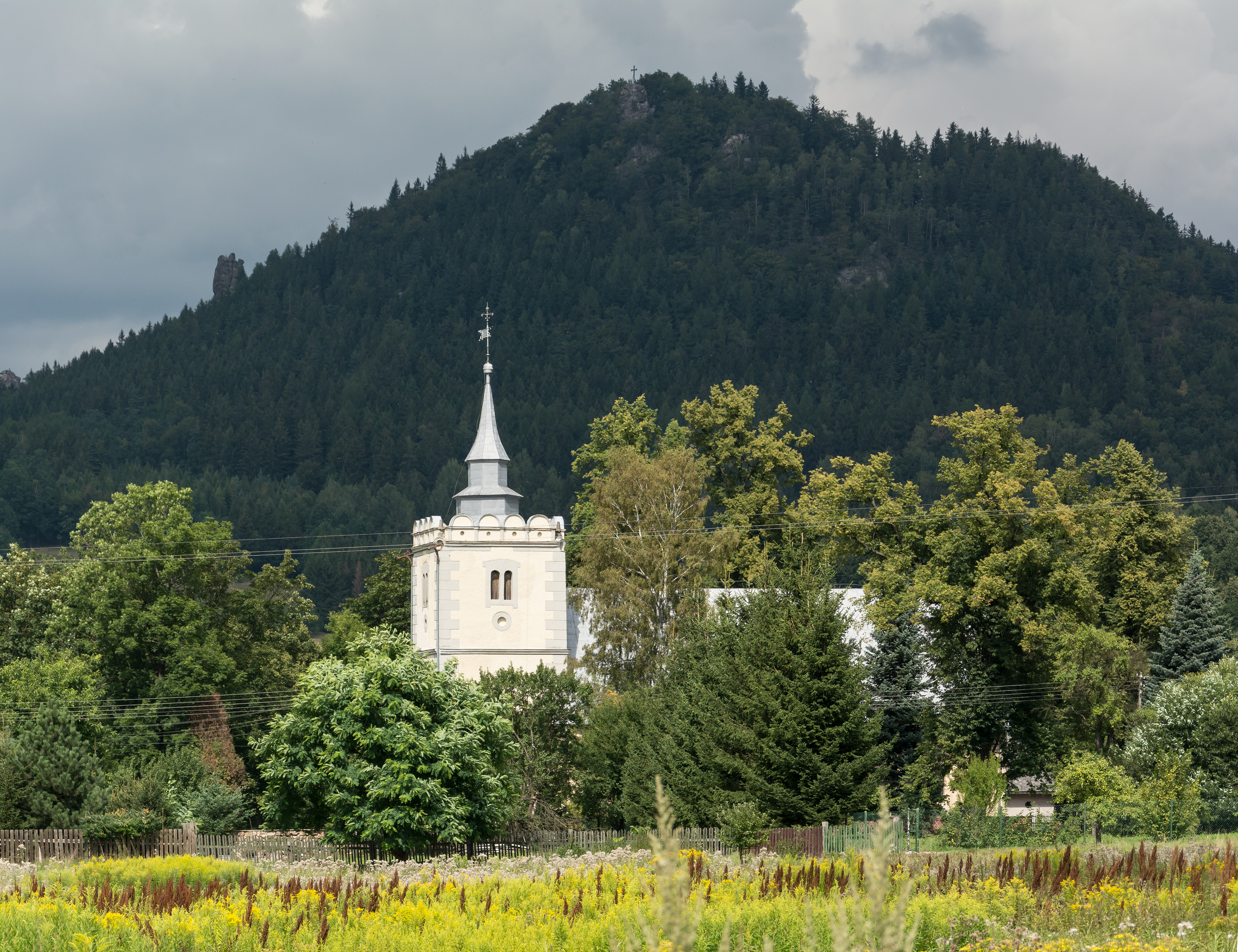
View from the old village of Karpniki

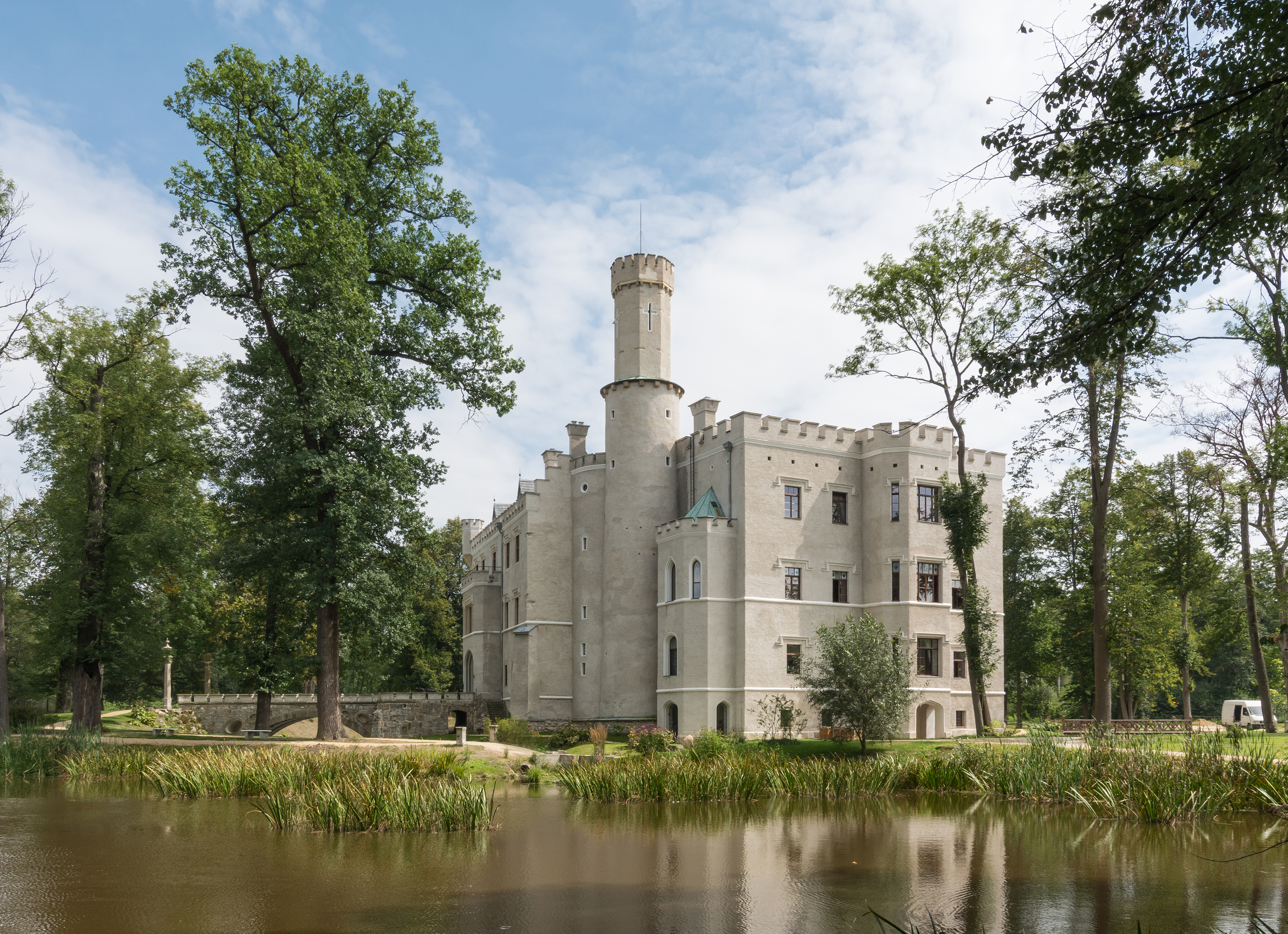
Karpniki Castle

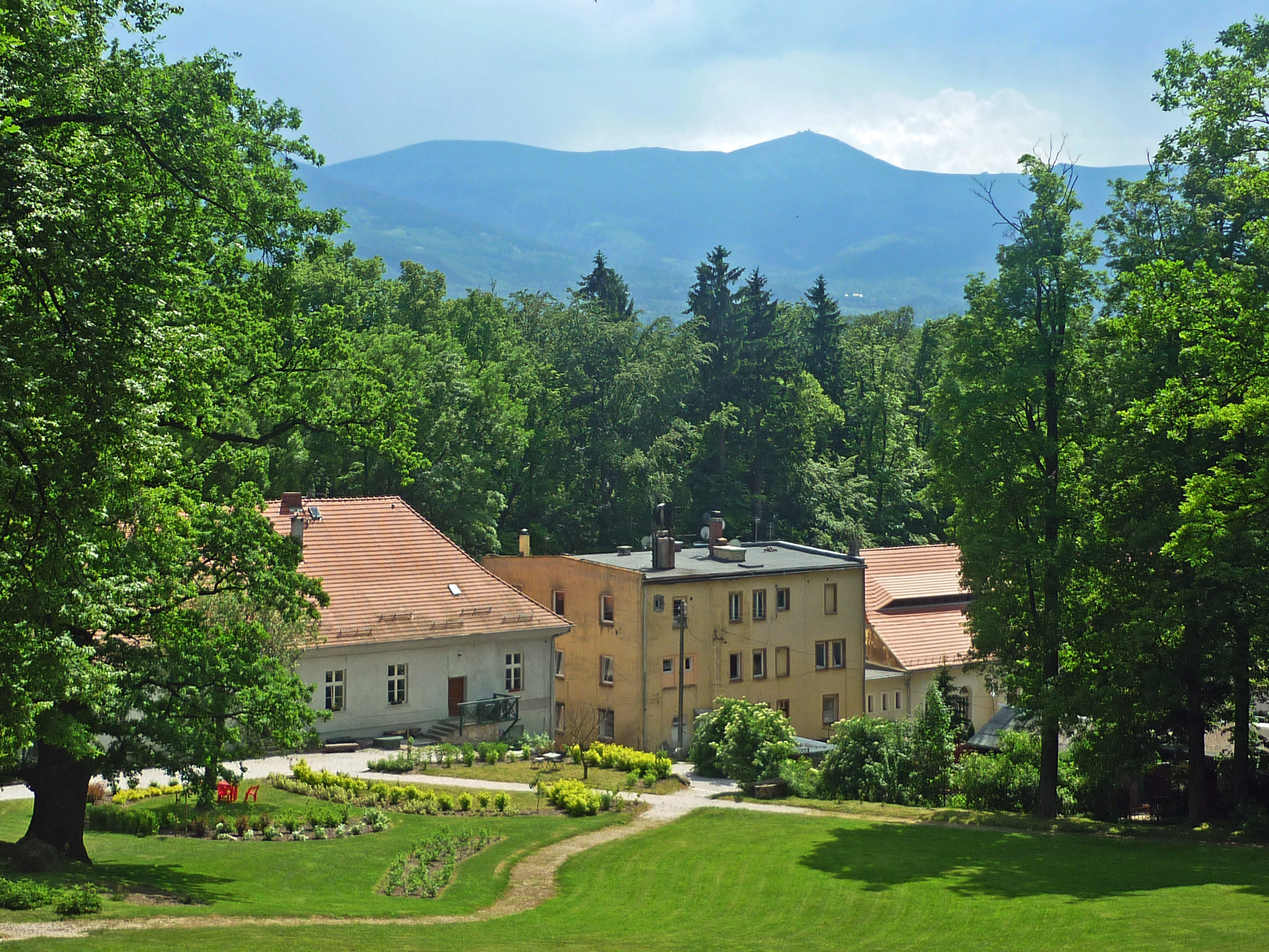
View from Bukowiec Palace Park
