= Jakubowo-Węgielin =

- Village
- Location within Poland
- Coordinates: 51°27′14″N 15°52′25″E
- Country: Poland
- Voivodeship: Lower Silesian
- County: Polkowice
- Gmina: Przemków

Jakubowo-Węgielin [jakuˈbɔvɔ vɛnˈɡʲɛlin] is a village in the administrative district of Gmina Przemków, within Polkowice County, Lower Silesian Voivodeship, in south-western Poland.
