= Piotrowice, Polkowice County =

Piotrowice
- Village
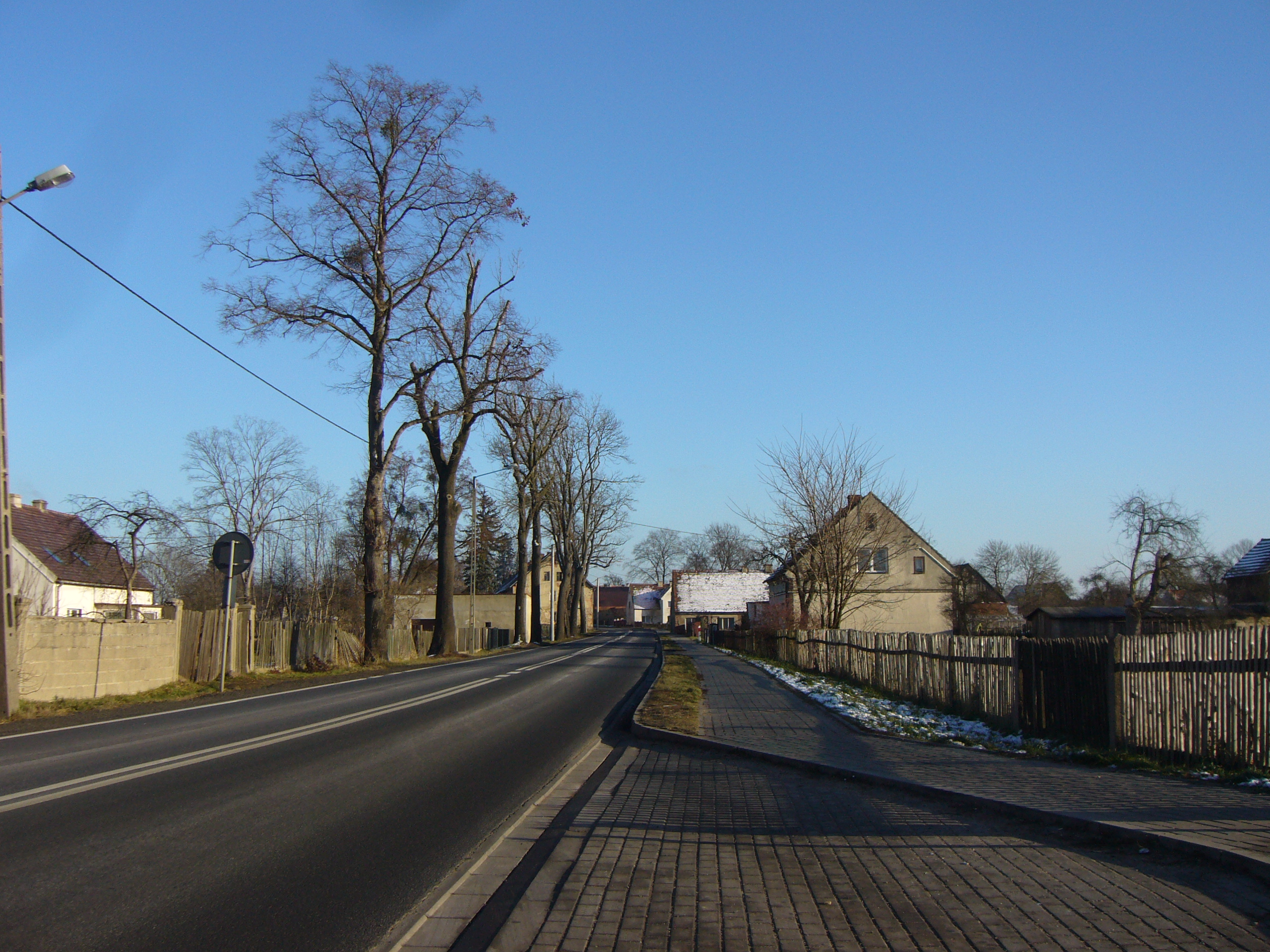

- Location within Poland
- Coordinates: 51°31′N 15°43′E
- Country: Poland
- Voivodeship: Lower Silesian
- County: Polkowice
- Gmina: Przemków
- Population: 390

Piotrowice [pjɔtrɔˈvit͡sɛ] is a village in the administrative district of Gmina Przemków, within Polkowice County, Lower Silesian Voivodeship, in south-western Poland.
