= Bóbr =

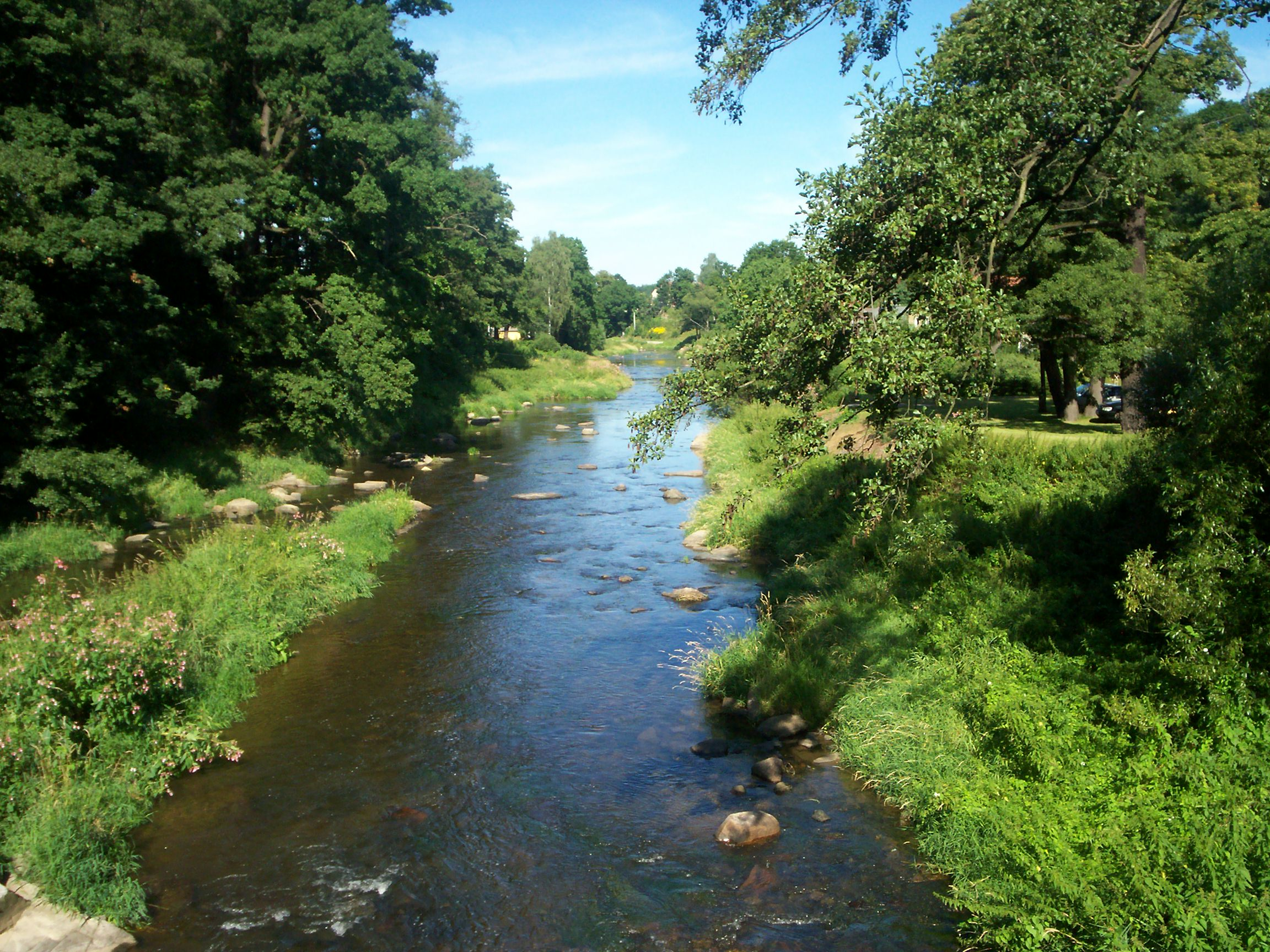
- Bóbr near Janowice Wielkie

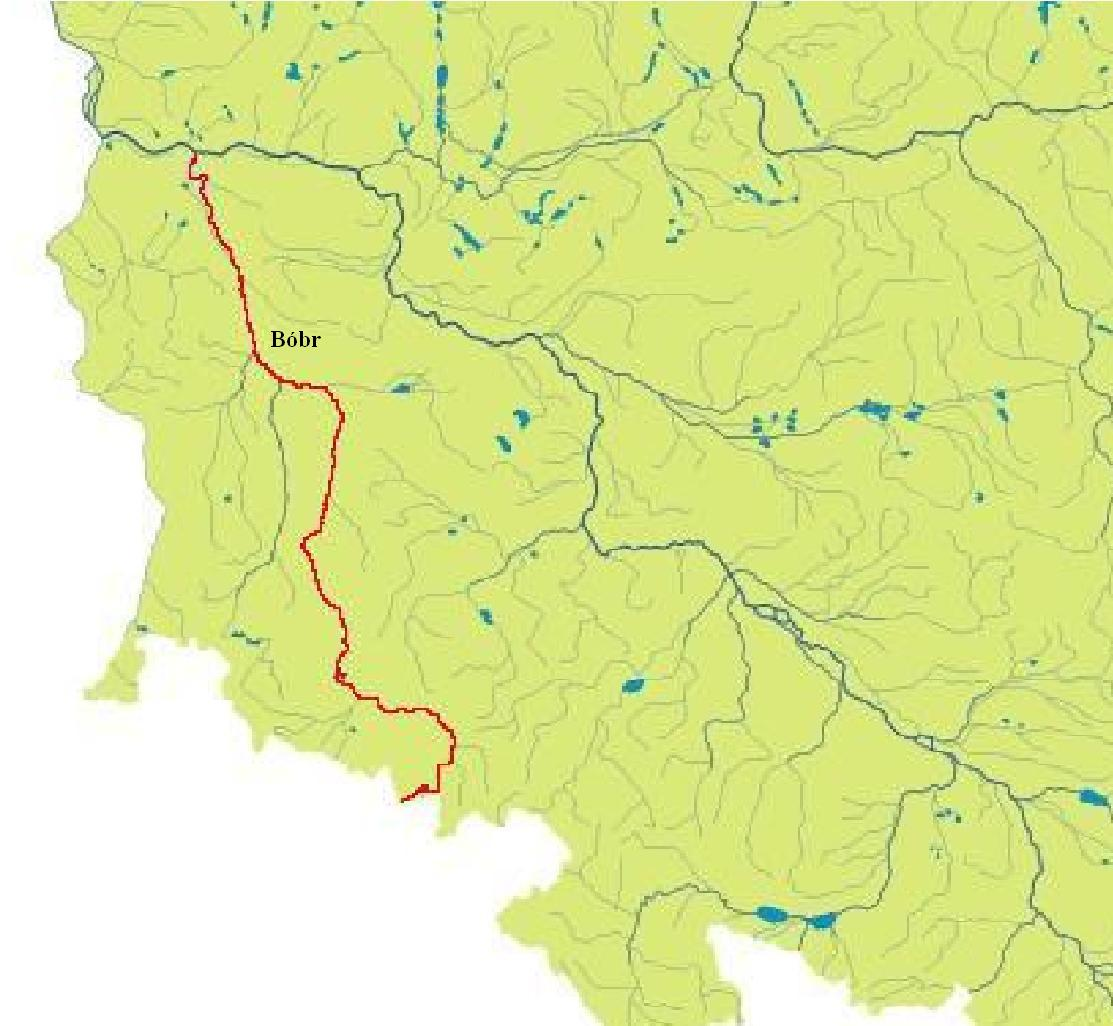
- River course in Poland

Location
- Countries: Czech Republic; Poland

Physical characteristics
- Source: Bobr, Žacléř; 50°40′51″N 15°54′31″E
- Mouth: Oder at Krosno Odrzańskie; 52°3′2″N 15°4′19″E
- Length: 279 km (173 mi)
- Basin size: 5,874 km^{2} (2,268 sq mi)
- Discharge
  - average: 44.8 m^{3}/s (1,580 cu ft/s)

Basin features
- Progression: Oder→ Baltic Sea

The Bóbr (Polish pronunciation: [ˈbubr]; Czech: Bobr; German: Bober [ˈboːbɐ]) is a river which flows through the north of the Czech Republic and the southwest of Poland. It is a left tributary of the Oder. Its Polish name translates directly to 'beaver'.

== Course ==
The Bóbr has a length of 279 kilometres (173 mi) (3 in Czech Republic, 276 in Poland, 10th longest Polish river) and a basin area of 5,874 square kilometres (2,268 sq mi) (44 in Czech Republic and 5,830 in Poland). It originates on a slope of the Rýchory mountains in the southeast of the Krkonoše range. The source is located near the small Bobr village of the Žacléř municipality in the Czech Hradec Králové Region. Parallel to the Lusatian Neisse tributary of the Oder in the west, it flows northwards from the Bohemian region into adjacent Silesia.

Shortly after the river crosses the border to Polish Niedamirów and runs northwestwards through the Jelenia Góra valley of the Western Sudetes to the dam of Pilchowice and downhill into the plains of Lower Silesia, passing the towns of Jelenia Góra, Bolesławiec, Szprotawa, and Żagań, where the parallel Kwisa river joins it. The river finally flows into the Oder near the town of Krosno. Non-navigable for its entire length, it is a popular destination for canoeing.

== History ==
Since the Middle Ages the lower Bóbr river north of Żagań and the Kwisa confluence marked the border between the historic regions of Silesia in the east and Lower Lusatia to the west. After in 937 King Otto I of Germany had established the Saxon Eastern March on the lands settled by Polabian Slavs, Margrave Gero until 963 subdued the Lusatian lands up to the border with Poland (Civitas Schinesghe). Upon Gero's death in 965, the river was the designated eastern border of the newly created March of Lusatia in the Holy Roman Empire.

The Polish territorial sovereignty was acknowledged to Duke Bolesław I Chrobry by Emperor Otto III at the Congress of Gniezno in 1000. Nevertheless, Bolesław laid claims to the lands west of the Bóbr, which he temporarily acquired by the 1018 Treaty of Bautzen. After Emperor Conrad II had reconquered the territory until 1031, the status quo was restored.

The river became an internal border, when the Luxembourg king John of Bohemia step-by-step vassalized the Piast dukes of Silesia and incorporated their lands with the consent of King Casimir III of Poland by the 1335 Treaty of Trentschin, whereafter both Lusatia in the west and Silesia in the east became Lands of the Bohemian Crown.

During the Potsdam Conference in 1945, the Western Allies briefly advocated a Polish-German border along the Oder, Bóbr and Kwisa rivers, but were rejected by Joseph Stalin, who had already committed himself to the Oder-Neisse line.

== Towns ==
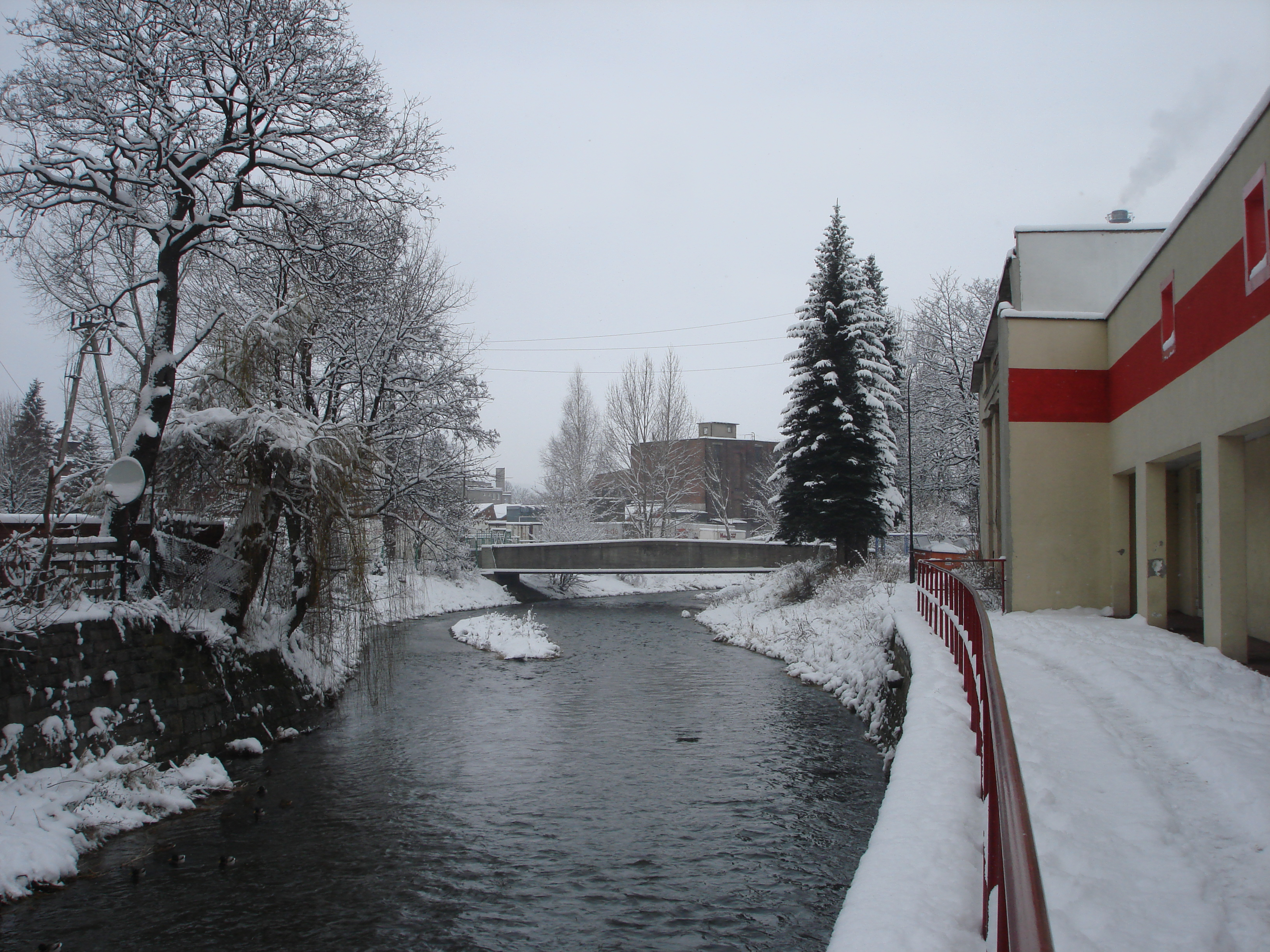
Bóbr in Kamienna Góra

- Lubawka
- Kamienna Góra
- Jelenia Góra
- Wleń
- Lwówek Śląski
- Bolesławiec
- Szprotawa
- Małomice
- Żagań
- Nowogród Bobrzański
- Krosno Odrzańskie
- Pstrąże

== Bóbr dam ==
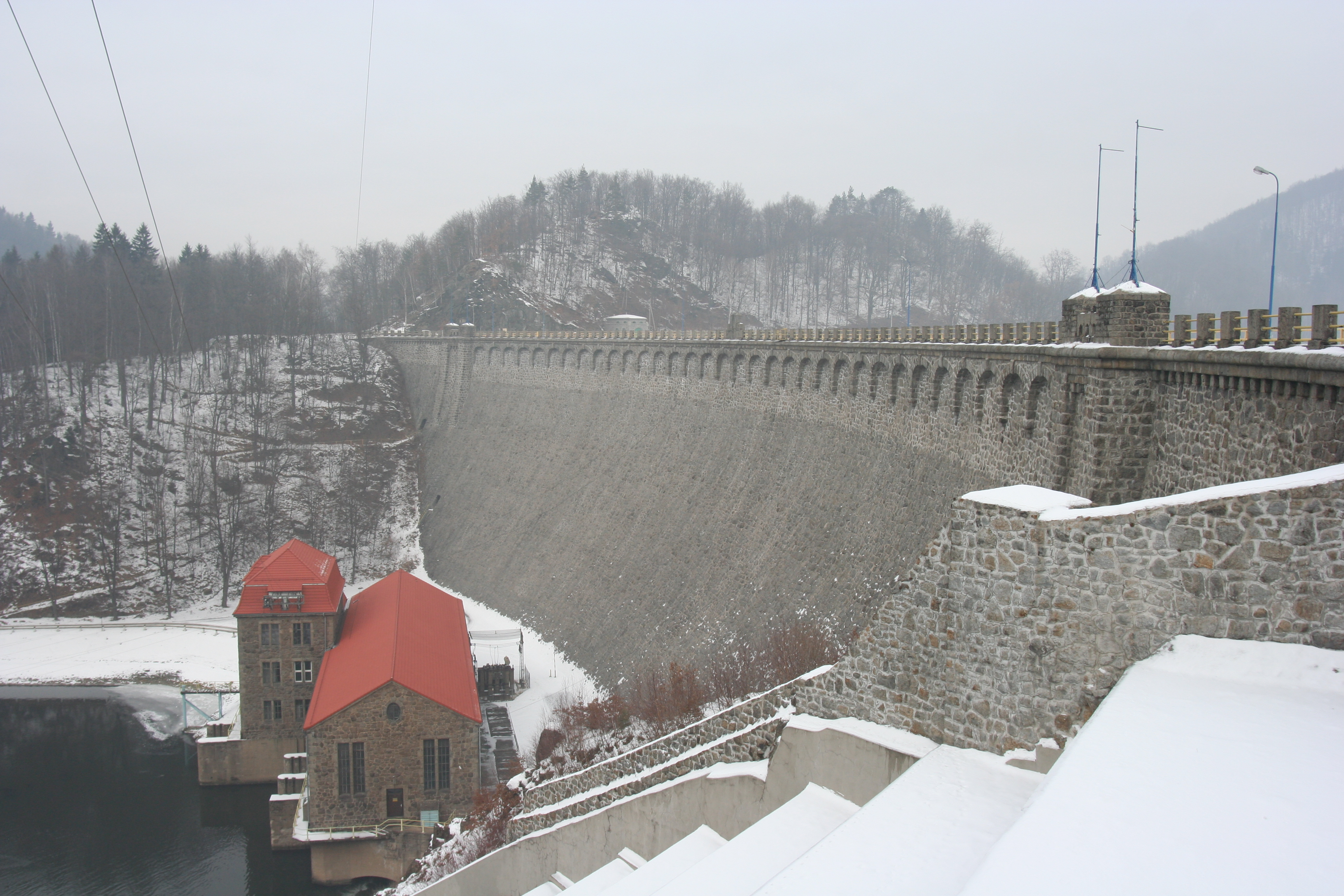
Pilchowice Dam

The Pilchowice Dam (Polish: Jezioro Pilchowickie, German: Talsperre Mauer) was built from 1904 to 1912 in the northern Karkonosze range near Jelenia Góra. Then the largest in Europe, surpassing even the Urft Dam built in 1905, it created a reservoir of about 4 km (2.5 mi) length.

The masonry structure was erected on a Gneiss basis according to the Intze Principle. Equipped with Francis turbines manufactured by Voith and Siemens-Schuckert and AEG generators, the hydroelectric plant supplies about 20,000,000 kWh a year, with a power rating of 7,585 kW.

== Protections ==
Parts of the Bóbr river valley is protected area in some form or another, and the river itself originates from the Krkonoše National Park in Czech Republic, close to the border with Poland. Protections in the Bóbr valley area include:

- Rudawy Landscape Park
- Bóbr Valley Landscape Park
- Przemków Landscape Park

== See also ==
- Rivers of Poland
