= Krępa, Lower Silesian Voivodeship =

Krępa
- Village
- Location within Poland
- Coordinates: 51°32′N 15°51′E
- Country: Poland
- Voivodeship: Lower Silesian
- County: Polkowice
- Gmina: Przemków

Krępa [ˈkrɛmpa] is a village in the administrative district of Gmina Przemków, within Polkowice County, Lower Silesian Voivodeship, in south-western Poland.
