= Jakubowo Lubińskie =

- Village
- Location within Poland
- Coordinates: 51°27′54″N 15°52′41″E
- Country: Poland
- Voivodeship: Lower Silesian
- County: Polkowice
- Gmina: Przemków
- Population: 300

Jakubowo Lubińskie [jakuˈbɔvɔ luˈbiɲskʲɛ] is a village in the administrative district of Gmina Przemków, within Polkowice County, Lower Silesian Voivodeship, in south-western Poland.
