= Ostaszów =

- Village
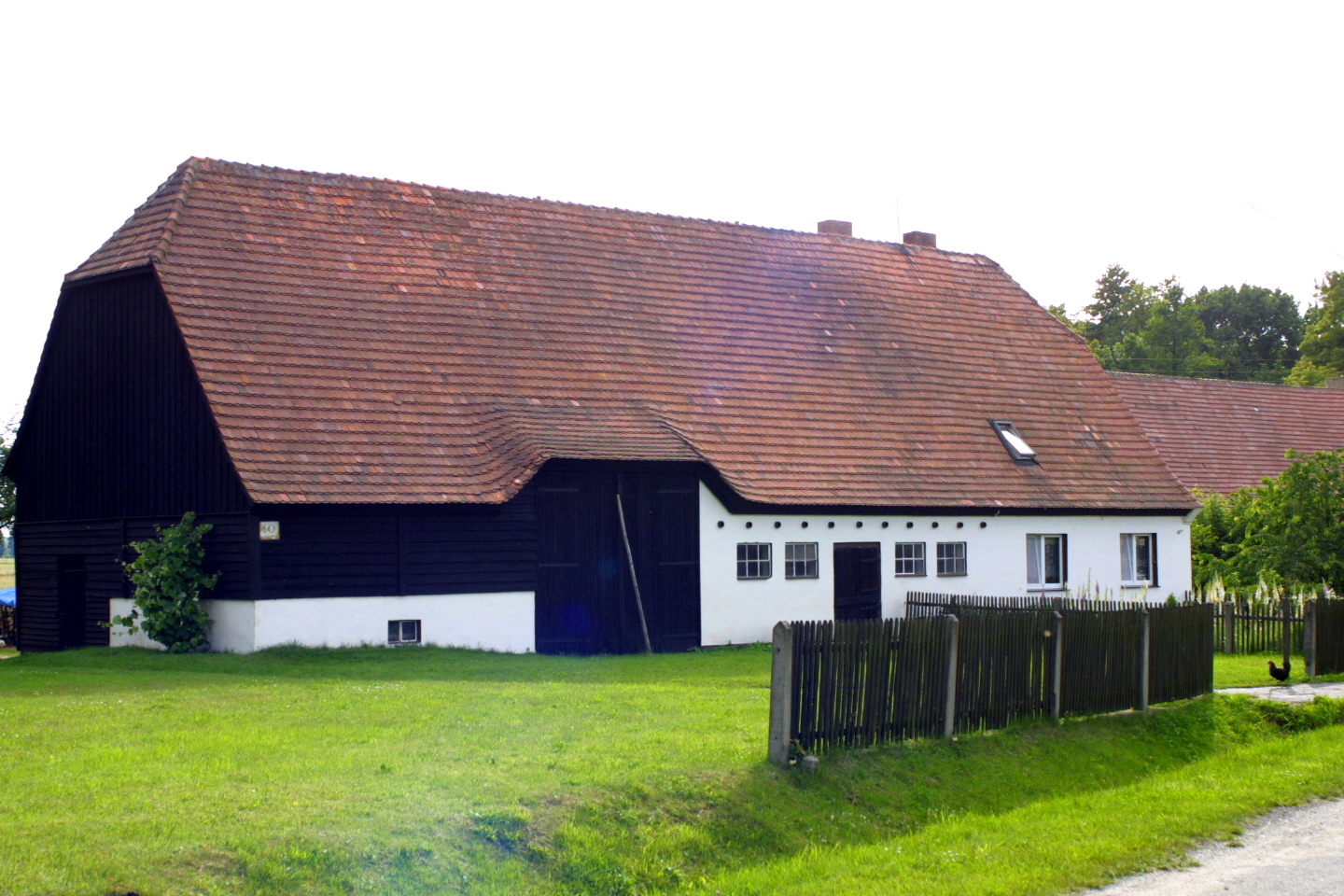

- Location within Poland
- Coordinates: 51°32′32″N 15°49′40″E
- Country: Poland
- Voivodeship: Lower Silesian
- County: Polkowice
- Gmina: Przemków
- Population: 283

Ostaszów [ɔsˈtaʂuf] (formerly Hierlshagen, 1936-1945) is a village in the administrative district of Gmina Przemków, within Polkowice County, Lower Silesian Voivodeship, in south-western Poland.

== History ==
The settlement was founded in 1936 when the area was part of the Province of Upper Silesia in Nazi Germany. 42 farms were built by the Reich Labour Service which named the village Hierlshagen, after the Service's leader Konstantin Hierl. In 2026, the Ministry of Culture and National Heritage declared that the village was a protected monument due to its historical significance and the condition of its architecture.
