= Wysoka, Polkowice County =

Wysoka
- Village
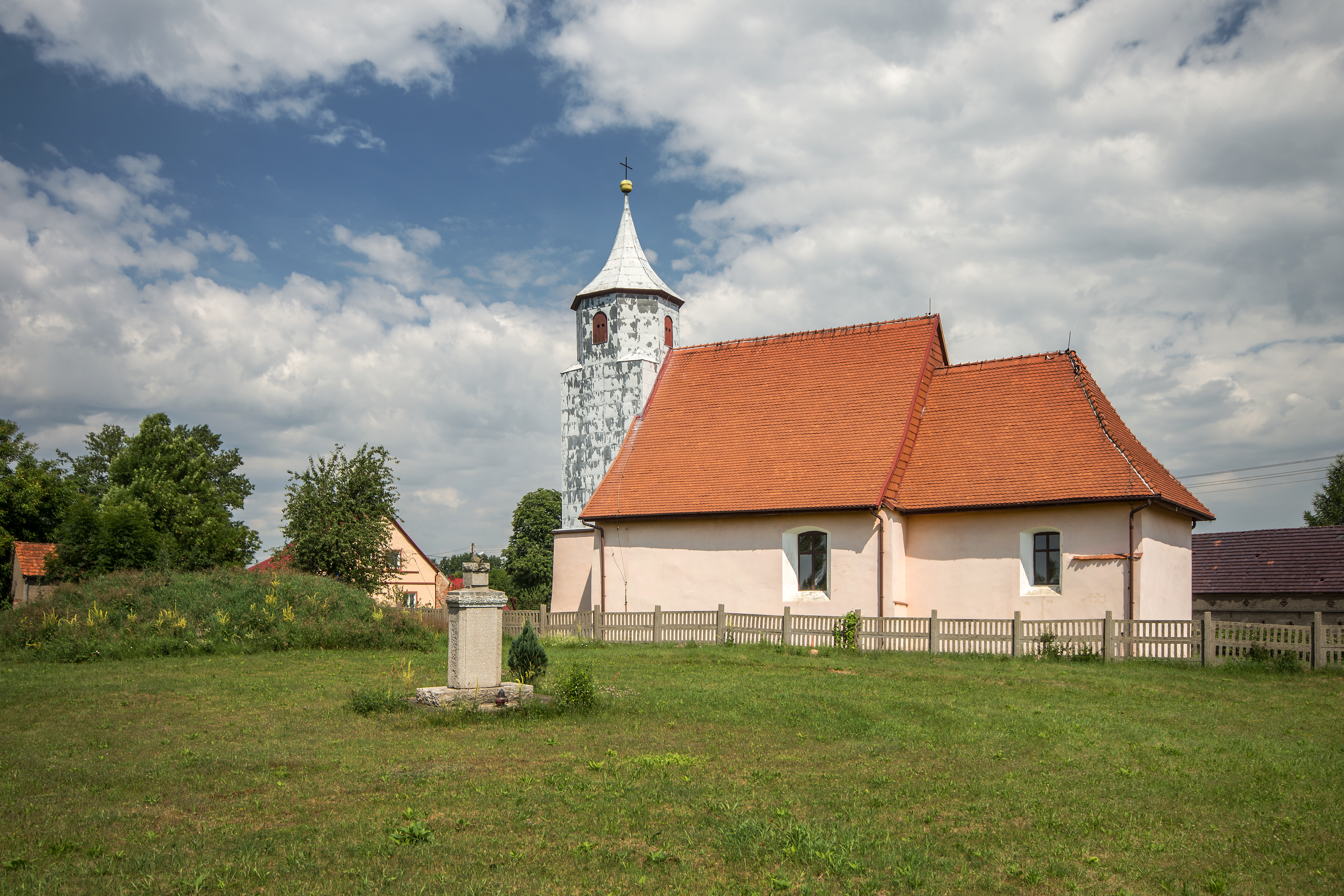
- Saint Martin church in Wysoka

- Location within Poland
- Coordinates: 51°29′N 15°51′E
- Country: Poland
- Voivodeship: Lower Silesian
- County: Polkowice
- Gmina: Przemków

Population
  - Total: 331
- Time zone: UTC+1 (CET)
  - Summer (DST): UTC+2 (CEST)
- Vehicle registration: DPL

Wysoka [vɨˈsɔka] is a village in the administrative district of Gmina Przemków, within Polkowice County, Lower Silesian Voivodeship, in south-western Poland.

The name of the village is of Polish origin and derives from the word wysoka, which means "high", referring to the village elevation.
