= Łomnica =

Łomnica may refer to:

- Łomnica, Jelenia Góra County in Lower Silesian Voivodeship (south-west Poland)
- Łomnica, Wałbrzych County in Lower Silesian Voivodeship (south-west Poland)
- Łomnica, Zgorzelec County in Lower Silesian Voivodeship (south-west Poland)
- Łomnica, Lublin Voivodeship (east Poland)
- Łomnica, Garwolin County in Masovian Voivodeship (east-central Poland)
- Łomnica, Siedlce County in Masovian Voivodeship (east-central Poland)
- Łomnica, Czarnków-Trzcianka County in Greater Poland Voivodeship (west-central Poland)
- Łomnica, Nowy Tomyśl County in Greater Poland Voivodeship (west Poland)
- Łomnica, Opole Voivodeship (south Poland)
- Łomnica, tributary of Bóbr a river tributary of Bóbr river
- Łomnica, tributary of Nysa Kłodzka a river tributary of Nysa Kłodzka river
- Łomnica, tributary of Dniestr a river tributary of Dniestr river

== See also ==
- Lomnica
- Lomnice (disambiguation)
