= Przemków =

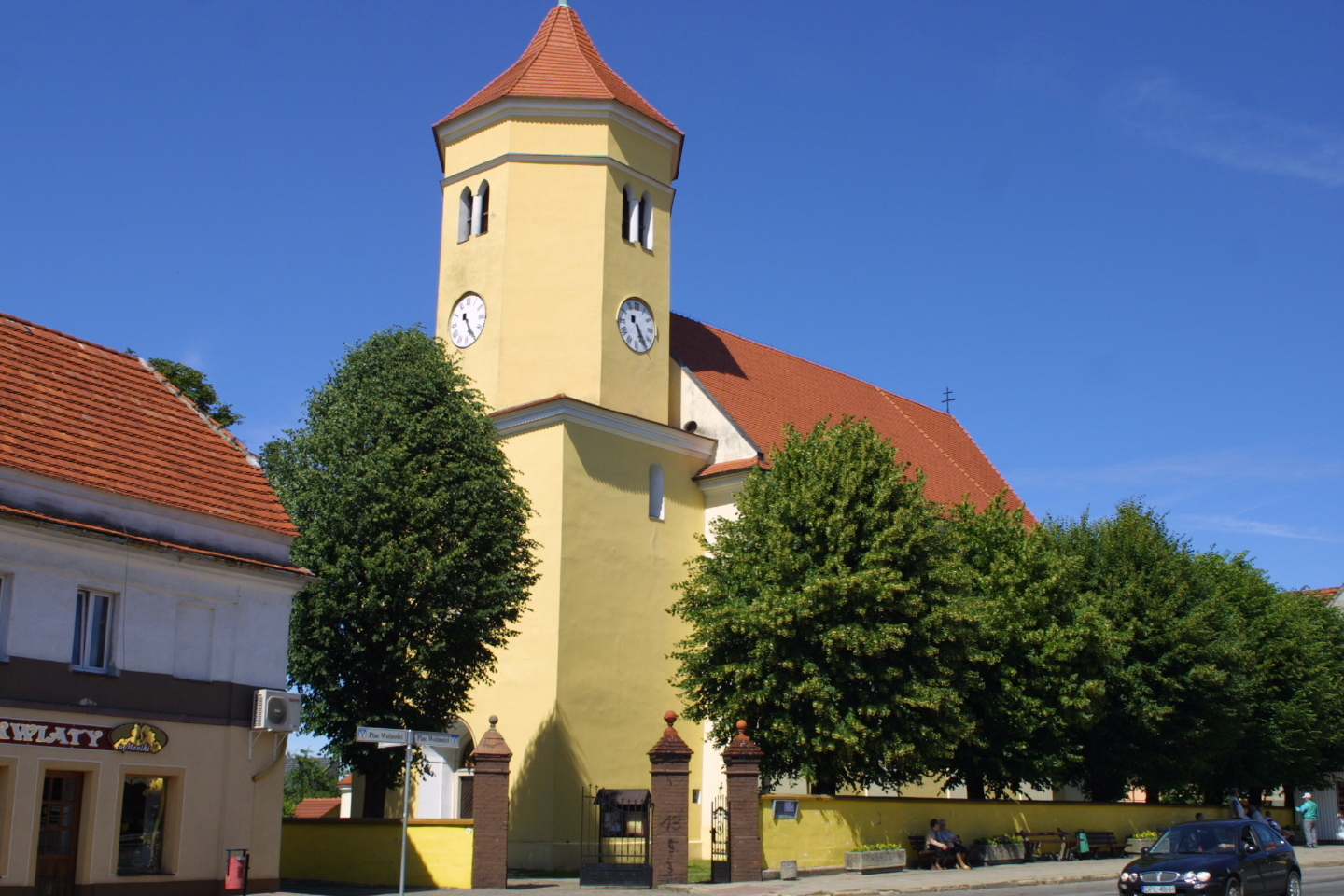
- Baroque Church of the Assumption

- Coat of arms

- Location within Poland
- Coordinates: 51°31′N 15°48′E
- Country: Poland
- Voivodeship: Lower Silesian
- County: Polkowice
- Gmina: Przemków
- Established: 1280
- Founded by: Przemko of Ścinawa
- Named after: Przemko of Ścinawa

Government
  - Mayor: Jerzy Szczupak

Area
  - Total: 5.64 km^{2} (2.18 sq mi)
- Highest elevation: 132 m (433 ft)
- Lowest elevation: 113 m (371 ft)

Population (2019-06-30)
  - Total: 6,107
  - Density: 1,080/km^{2} (2,800/sq mi)
- Time zone: UTC+1 (CET)
  - Summer (DST): UTC+2 (CEST)
- Postal code: 59 – 170
- Car plates: DPL
- Climate: Dfb
- Website: http://www.przemkow.pl/

Przemków [ˈpʂɛmkuf] (German: Primkenau) is a town in Polkowice County, Lower Silesian Voivodeship, in western Poland. It is the seat of the administrative district called Gmina Przemków.

As of 2019, the town has a population of 6,107.

Przemków gives its name to the nearby protected area called Przemków Landscape Park.

== History ==
Przemków was initially a Polish trade settlement, which was granted town rights in 1280 by Duke Przemko of Ścinawa from the Piast dynasty and named after him. In the past, it was also known in Polish as Przemkowo or Przymkowo.

Two labour camps of the Reich Labour Service were operated in the town under Nazi Germany.

== Demographics ==
Historical population

Year	Pop.	±%
1890	1,904	—
1900	2,156	+13.2%
1910	2,853	+32.3%
1925	2,627	−7.9%

Year	Pop.	±%
1939	4,860	+85.0%
1950	1,692	−65.2%
1960	4,299	+154.1%
2010	6,372	+48.2%

== Cuisine ==
The officially protected traditional food of Przemków, as designated by the Ministry of Agriculture and Rural Development of Poland, is the Przemków honey gingerbread.

== Notable people ==
- Adolf Ernst (1832–1899), scientist
- Albert, Duke of Schleswig-Holstein (1869–1931), died at the palace
- Ernst Gunther, Duke of Schleswig-Holstein (1863–1921), died at the palace
