= Wilkocin =

- Village
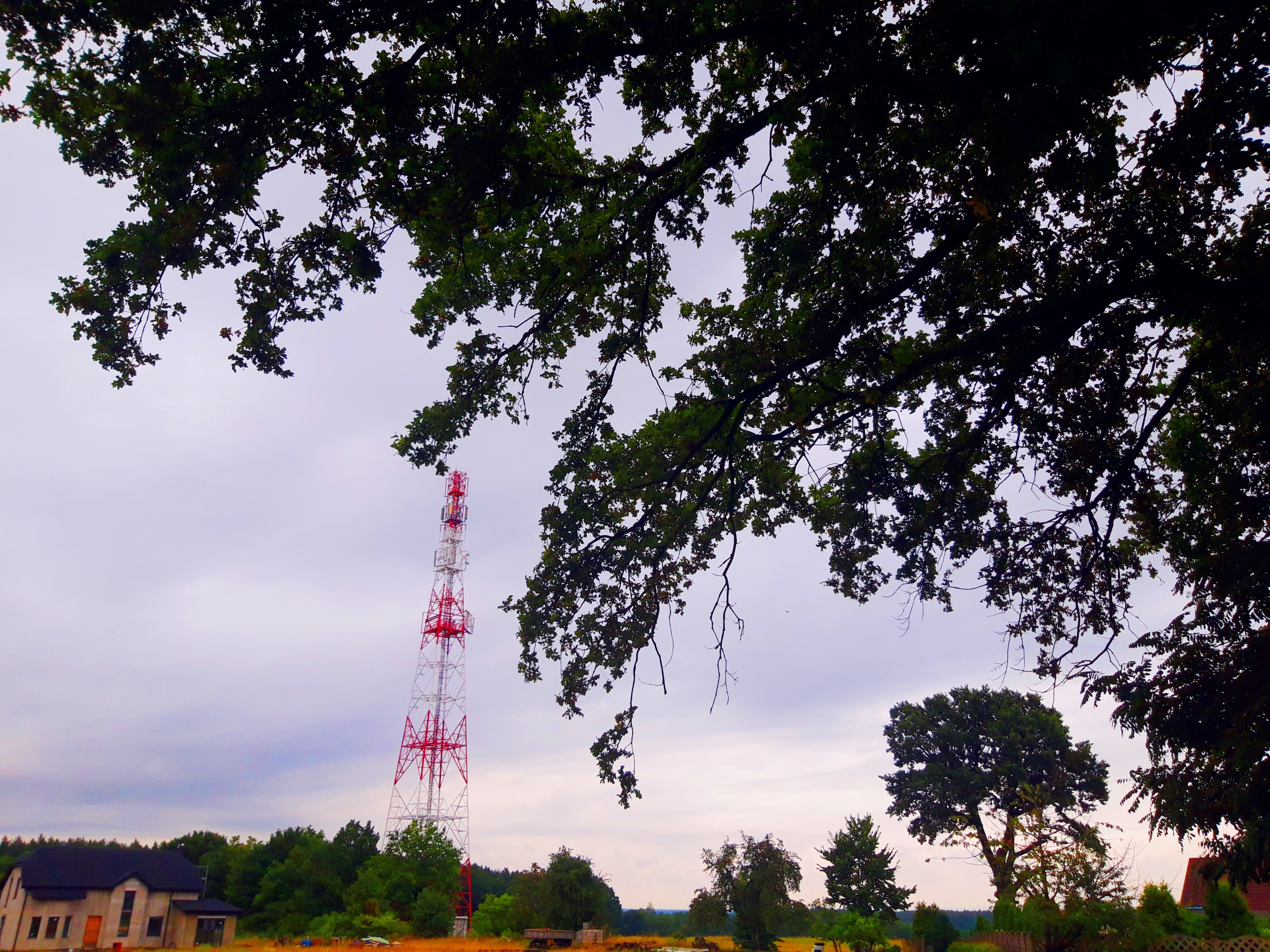

- Location within Poland
- Coordinates: 51°29′N 15°49′E
- Country: Poland
- Voivodeship: Lower Silesian
- County: Polkowice
- Gmina: Przemków
- Population: 269

Wilkocin [vilˈkɔt͡ɕin] (German: Wolfersdorf) is a village in the administrative district of Gmina Przemków, within Polkowice County, Lower Silesian Voivodeship, in south-western Poland.
