= Lomnice =

Lomnice may refer to places in the Czech Republic:

- Lomnice (river), a tributary of the Otava
- Lomnice (Brno-Country District), a market town in the South Moravian Region
- Lomnice (Bruntál District), a municipality and village in the Moravian-Silesian Region
- Lomnice (Sokolov District), a municipality and village in the Karlovy Vary Region
- Lomnice nad Lužnicí, a town in the South Bohemian Region
- Lomnice nad Popelkou, a town in the Liberec Region

== See also ==
- Lomnica
- Łomnica (disambiguation)
