= Larissa Adler Lomnitz =

French-born Chilean-Mexican social anthropologist (1932–2019)

- Born: Larissa Adler Milstein; 17 June 1932; Paris, France
- Died: 13 April 2019 (aged 87); Mexico City, Mexico
- Education: University of California, Berkeley (B.S. in Social Anthropology); Universidad Iberoamericana (PH.D. in Social Anthropology)
- Spouse: Cinna Lomnitz (m. 1950)
- Children: 4, including Claudio Lomnitz
- Parents: Miguel Adler (father); Noemi Lisa Milstein (mother)

Larissa Adler Lomnitz (née Milstein; 17 June 1932 - 13 April 2019) was a French-born Chilean-Mexican social anthropologist, researcher, professor, and academic. After living in France, Colombia, and Israel, she received Chilean nationality by marriage and Mexican nationality by residence.

She conducted research and studies regarding the way in which marginalized classes survive in Latin America. She pioneered the study of social networks and the study of the importance of trust for the economy and politics. Her first study in this regard focused on the exchange of favors in the Chilean middle class. Lomnitz completed her doctoral thesis about the importance of exchanging favors and confidence in the informal economy in Mexico City. She then explored the importance of social networks in very diverse fields: scientific communities, the Mexican upper class, and the teaching profession in Chile, among others. She wrote more than 70 chapters in books, nine books, and various popular articles for magazines.

== Early life and education ==
Larissa Adler Milstein was born in 1932 in Paris, France to Romanian-Jewish émigrés. Her father was the anthropologist, Miguel Adler, who trained with Paul Rivet. Her mother was Noemi Lisa Milstein de Adler (1910-1976).

Shortly after Larissa's birth, her family moved to live in Colombia. In 1948, when the State of Israel was formed, her family joined the Kibbutz movement. In 1950, she married the Chilean geophysicist, Cinna Lomnitz, with whom she lived in Chile and the United States. Their children were Jorge (1954-1993), Claudio, Alberto, and Tania. She earned a bachelor's degree with Honors in Social Anthropology at the University of California, Berkeley. In 1974, she earned a doctorate in the same specialty at the Universidad Iberoamericana (UIA) of Mexico City.

== Career ==
In 1967, Lomnitz affiliated with the Center for Mental Health Research at the University of Chile. In Mexico, she affiliated with the Children's Hospital of the Secretariat of Health, as well as the Center for Technological Innovation and the Institute of Applied Mathematics Research of National Autonomous University of Mexico. Lomnitz taught ethnology and economic anthropology at Universidad Iberoamericana; Urban sociology and Exchange Systems at the Faculty of Architecture of the National Autonomous University of Mexico; and Urban Methodology and Anthropology at the National School of Anthropology and History). She was a visiting professor at Columbia University, the Graduate School of Arts and Science of the New York University, the University of Wisconsin–Madison, the University of Notre Dame, the Hebrew University of Jerusalem, the Fundación José Ortega y Gasset, the University of Chicago, and the University of Paris among others.

She specialized in research and study on how people live and help marginalized classes in Latin America. As with Oscar Lewis, Lomnitz rejected the relationship between human migration, urbanization, and disorganization proposed by the Chicago environmentalists based on the theories of Richard Adams. She conducted studies of the Mexican university world indicating that there were four “life careers”: academic, professional, ideological politics, and pragmatic politics. In the area of political anthropology, she demonstrated that highly centralized systems generate a parallel system of informal economy, as happened in the former Soviet Union.

Lomnitz was a member of several societies and academies, including the Mexican Society of Anthropology, the Mexican Academy of Sciences, the Society of Urban Anthropology and Economics, The College of Ethnologists and Anthropologists, and the Javier Barros Sierra Foundation. She served as president of the Society for Latin American Anthropology, and was the director of the War and Peace Studies Commission of the International Union of Anthropological and Ethnological Sciences.

She was a member of the Scientific Committee of the UNESCO Forum on Higher Education Research and Knowledge. She was an emeritus researcher for the National System of Researchers and a member of the Science Advisory Council of the Presidency of the Republic.

In 2010, she was elected a member of the American Academy of Arts and Sciences.

Guillermo de la Peña Topete published Lomnitz's biography, Larissa Adler Lomnitz: Antropóloga latinoamericana, in 2004. She died in Mexico City, Mexico, on 13 April 2019, aged 87.

== Awards and honors ==
- Guggenheim Fellowship, 1977
- Premio Universidad Nacional, in the area of social sciences, Universidad Nacional Autónoma de México (UNAM), 1990
- Investigadora Emérita, Sistema Nacional de Investigadores, 1996
- Honorary doctorate, University of Massachusetts, 1998
- Alfonso Reyes Chair, University of Paris, 2000
- Chair of Mexican Studies, University of Notre Dame, 2001.
- Emeritus Researcher, Institute of Applied Mathematics and Systems Research, UNAM, 2005
- National Prize for Arts and Sciences, 2006
- Member, American Academy of Arts and Sciences, 2010

== Selected works ==
- Reciprocity of Favors in the Middle Class of Chile, 1971
- Networks and marginality (Cerrada del Cóndor, engl.) Life in a Mexican shantytown., 1977
- ¿Cómo sobreviven los marginados?
- A Mexican Elite Family 1820-1980 : Kinship, Class and Culture, 1987
- Chile's middle class : a struggle for survival in the face of neoliberalism, 1991
- Redes sociales cultura y poder : ensayos de antropologia latinoamericana, 1994
- Chile's political culture and parties : an anthropological explanation 2000
- Simbolismo y ritual en la política mexicana
- Lo formal y lo informal en las sociedades contemporáneas, 2008
- "Migration" in Networks and Marginality, 1977
- “Supervivencia en una barriada de la ciudad de México” in Demografía y Economía
- "Problemática de la ciencia en México" in Ciencia
- “Anthropology and Development in Latin America” in Human Organization
