= Claudio Lomnitz =

Claudio Lomnitz is the Campbell Family Professor and Chair of the Anthropology Department at Columbia University. Prior to teaching at Columbia, Lomnitz was a Distinguished University Professor of Anthropology and Chair of the Committee on Historical Studies at the New School University. He served at different points in time as co-director of the University of Chicago's Mexican Studies Program (with Friedrich Katz), Director of the University of Chicago's Latin American Studies Program, and Director of Columbia University's Center for the Study of Ethnicity and Race. He has also taught at University of Chicago, where he was Professor of History, New York University, El Colegio de México, and Universidad Autónoma Metropolitana Iztapalapa, in Mexico City. At the New School University, Lomnitz served as editor of the academic journal Public Culture between 2006-2011. He also co-edited, with Fernando Escalante Gonzalbo, the collection "Umbrales" in Mexico's Fondo de Cultura Económica. In 2020 he was elected member of Mexico's El Colegio Nacional (Mexico).

== Biography ==
Claudio Lomnitz was born in Chile. His parents, the Chilean geophysicist, Cinna Lomnitz, and the French-born Chilean-Mexican anthropologist, Larissa Adler Lomnitz, married in 1950. His siblings include Jorge (1954-1993), Alberto, and Tania.

Lomnitz received his undergraduate degree from Universidad Autónoma Metropolitana Iztapalapa. In 1982, Fondo de Cultura Económica published his first book, a study of politics and cultural change in Tepoztlán entitled Evolución de una sociedad rural. His interest in Latin America developed further as he pursued a Ph.D. in anthropology from Stanford University, receiving it in 1987. His next book, Exits from the Labyrinth: Culture and Ideology in the Mexican National Space, published by University of California Press in 1992, was an important intervention in the study of nationalist ideology and its relationship to the involved community. He has since written five other books on Mexico: Modernidad Indiana: 9 ensayos sobre nación y mediación en México published by Planeta in 1999; Deep Mexico, Silent Mexico: An Anthropology of Nationalism published by University of Minnesota Press in 2001 and described by Lomnitz as an expansion of ideas explored in Exits from the Labyrinth; Death and the Idea of Mexico, published by Zone Books in 2005; "El Antisemitismo y la ideología de la Revolución Mexicana" (Fondo de Cultura Económica, 2010); and, with Friedrich Katz, "El porfiriato y la revolución en la historia de México: Una conversación" (Ediciones ERA, 2012). "The Return of Comrade Ricardo Flores Magón" (Zone Books, 2014) won the Latin American Studies Association book prize for the best book in the humanities on Mexico, a Spanish translation by Jorge Aguilar Mora appeared with Editorial Era in 2016. His most recent books include "Nuestra América: My Family in the Vertigo of Translation" (Other Press, 2021), "El tejido social rasgado" (Ediciones ERA, 2021; "Para una teología política del crimen organizado" (Ediciones ERA, 2023); and "Sovereignty and Extortion: A New State Form in Mexico" (Duke University Press, 2024).

Some of Lomnitz's essays have been published in short book format as well: "El antisemitismo y la ideología de la revolución Mexicana" (Fondo de Cultura Económica, 2010), "El primer linchamiento de México (El Colegio de México, 2015), and "La nación desdibujada: México en trece ensayos" (Editorial Malpaso, 2016). He also edited a volume commemorating the 50th anniversary of Mexico's 1968 movement: "1968-2018: Cincuenta años de historia colectiva" (UNAM, 2018).

Lomnitz was for many years a regular collaborator at La Jornada, a daily newspaper published in Mexico City, and has a monthly column in Nexos; for some years he also wrote a weekly column in Excélsior, a daily newspaper published in Mexico City.

In 2010, he was awarded Mexico's National Drama Award for a historical play titled "El verdadero Bulnes," co-authored with his brother, Alberto Lomnitz. Claudio and Alberto Lomnitz co-authored a second play, a political musical, together with composer Leonardo Soqui, titled "La Gran Familia", that was launched at the 2018 edition of the Festival Internacional Cervantino, with Mexico's Compañía Nacional de Teatro. Claudio Lomnitz was fellow at the Wissenschaftskolleg zu Berlin in 2011–12, and a recipient of the Humboldt Research Award in 2016.
