= Gmina Przemków =

Gmina Przemków Przemków Commune
- Gmina
- Coat of arms

- Coordinates (Przemków): 51°31′N 15°48′E
- Country: Poland
- Voivodeship: Lower Silesian
- County: Polkowice
- Seat: Przemków

Area
  - Total: 108.04 km^{2} (41.71 sq mi)

Population (2019-06-30)
  - Total: 8,329
  - Density: 77.09/km^{2} (199.7/sq mi)
  - Urban: 6,107
  - Rural: 2,222
- Website: http://przemkow.pl/

Gmina Przemków is an urban-rural gmina (administrative district) in Polkowice County, Lower Silesian Voivodeship, in south-western Poland. Its seat is the town of Przemków, which lies approximately 19 kilometres (12 mi) west of Polkowice, and 97 kilometres (60 mi) north-west of the regional capital Wrocław.

The gmina covers an area of 108.04 square kilometres (41.7 sq mi), and as of 2019 its total population is 8,329.

== Neighbouring gminas ==
Gmina Przemków is bordered by the gminas of Chocianów, Gaworzyce, Gromadka, Niegosławice, Radwanice and Szprotawa.

== Villages ==
Apart from the town of Przemków, the gmina contains the villages of Jakubowo Lubińskie, Jakubowo-Węgielin, Jędrzychówek, Karpie, Krępa, Łąkociny, Łężce, Ostaszów, Piotrowice, Szklarki, Wilkocin and Wysoka.
