= Przemków Landscape Park =

Protected area in Poland

- Przemkowski Park Krajobrazowy
- IUCN category V (protected landscape/seascape)
- Interactive map of Przemków Landscape Park
- Location: Lower Silesian Voivodeship
- Coordinates: 51°29′34″N 15°46′46″E
- Area: 223.38 km^{2} (86.25 sq mi)
- Established: 1997

Ramsar Wetland
- Official name: Przemków Fish Ponds
- Designated: 9 April 2015
- Reference no.: 2320

Scenic Park of Przemkow (Przemkowski Park Krajobrazowy) is a protected area (Landscape Park) in western Poland, established in 1997, covering an area of 223.38 square kilometres (86.25 sq mi).

The Park lies within Lower Silesian Voivodeship: in Bolesławiec County (Gmina Gromadka) and Polkowice County (Gmina Chocianów, Gmina Gaworzyce, Gmina Przemków, Gmina Radwanice).

== Features ==
There are four nature reserves within the park, two ornithological: Buczyna Piotrowicka, Stawy Przemkowskie (Ponds of Przemkow) and two floristic: Legi Zrodliskowe and Torfowisko Borowki.

Pasternik Mountain is the highest point in the park at 187.4 m (615 ft). It is an uncommon inland dune formation.

Arguably the oldest tree in Poland is located within the park borders in Piotrowice village. It is pedunculate oak named "Chrobry" estimated to be 720 years old.

There are two Nature Paths within the borders of the park: Lasy okolic Przemkowa (Przemkow Neighbourhood's Forests) and Ponds of Przemkow. Since 2010, the reintroduction of the European ground squirrel (Spermophilus citellus), or European souslik has been taking place in the area near Jakubowo Lubińskie as part of the bigger reintroduction of this species in the fauna of Poland led by Polish Association for Nature Preservation "Salamandra".

== Protected species ==
Rare protected species found in the park include: lesser periwinkle (Vinca minor), common ivy (Hedera helix), Old World Royal fern (Osmunda regalis), Yellow Water-lily (Nuphar luteum), European white waterlily (Nymphaea alba), Nymphaea candida, Asian goatsbeard (Aruncus sylvestris), globe-flower (Trollius europaeus), common sundew (Drosera rotundifolia), oblong-leaved sundew (Drosera intermedia), Pinus uliginosa, heath spotted orchid (Orchis maculata), Richly-leaved dactylorhiza (Orchis latifolia), mezereon (Daphne mezereum), honeysuckle (Lonicera periclymenum), wolf's-foot clubmoss (Lycopodium clavatum), Lycopodium onnotinum, and Northern firmoss (Lycopodium selago).
