= Łąkociny, Lower Silesian Voivodeship =

Łąkociny
- Village
- Location within Poland
- Coordinates: 51°29′13″N 15°53′52″E
- Country: Poland
- Voivodeship: Lower Silesian
- County: Polkowice
- Gmina: Przemków

Łąkociny [wɔnkɔˈt͡ɕinɨ] is a village in the administrative district of Gmina Przemków, within Polkowice County, Lower Silesian Voivodeship, in south-western Poland.
