= Western European broadleaf forests =

Ecoregion in Western Europe

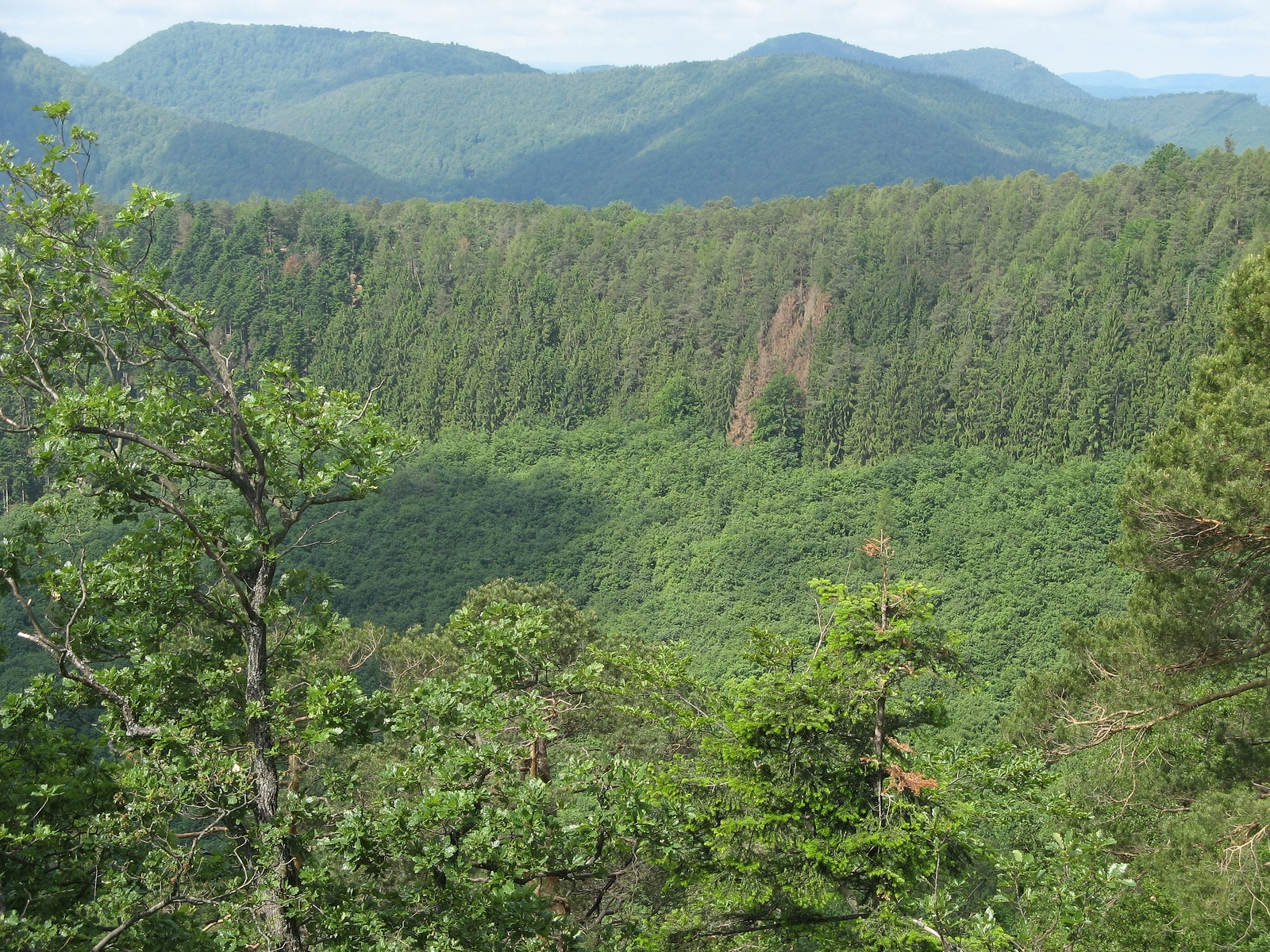
- Temperate mixed forests covering the mountain slopes in Vosges du Nord Bioreserve in Alsace, France.

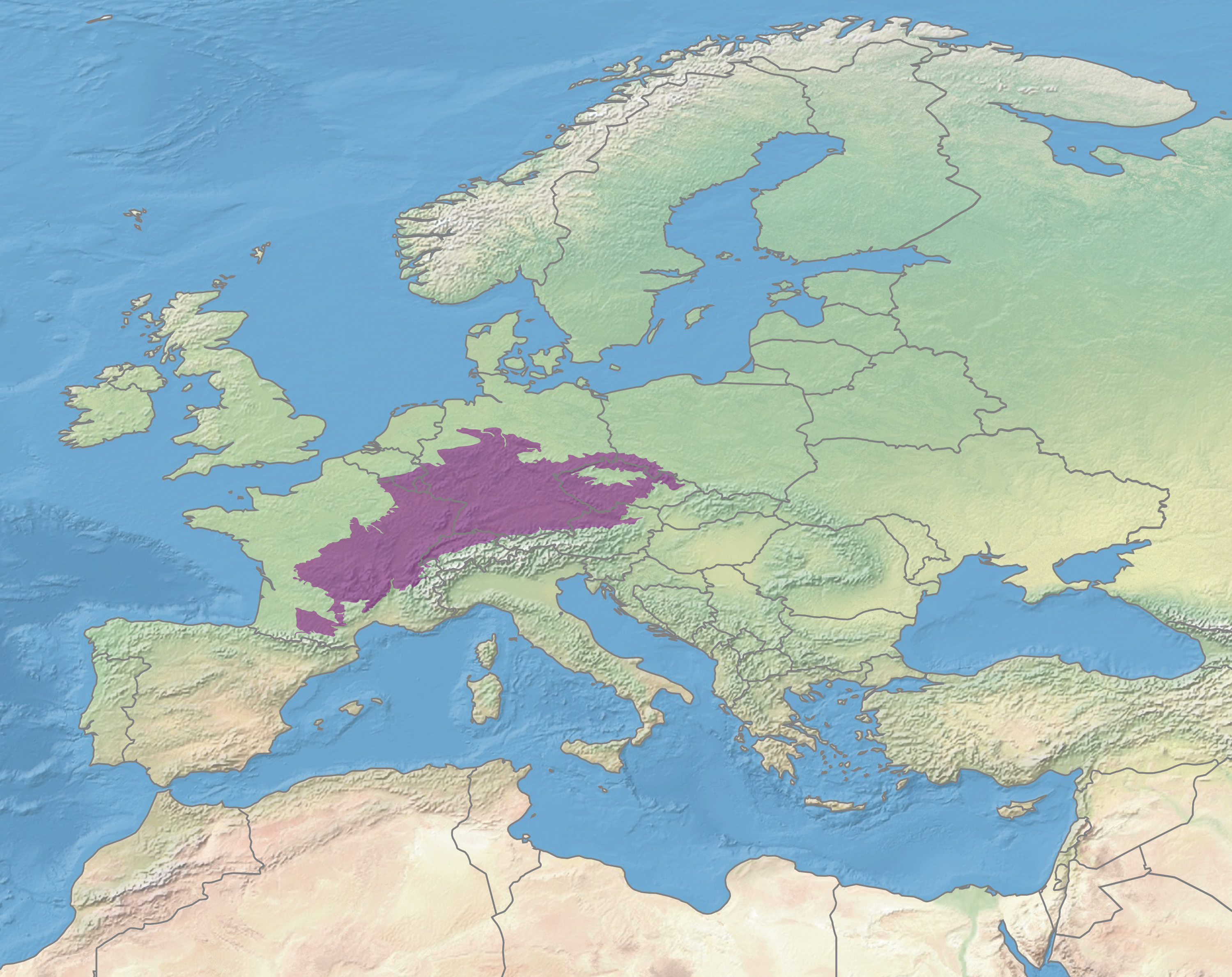
- Ecoregion PA0445

Ecology
- Realm: Palearctic
- Biome: temperate broadleaf and mixed forests
- Borders: List: Central European mixed forests; Pannonian mixed forests; Alps conifer and mixed forests; Northeast Spain and Southern France Mediterranean forests; Pyrenees conifer and mixed forests; European Atlantic mixed forests

Geography
- Area: 492,357 km^{2} (190,100 mi^{2})
- Countries: List: Poland; Czech Republic; Austria; Germany; Switzerland; France; Luxembourg; Belgium; Netherlands
- Coordinates: 49.153870°N 8.875401°E

Conservation
- Conservation status: Critical/Endangered

The Western European broadleaf forests is an ecoregion in Western Europe, and parts of the Alps. It comprises temperate broadleaf and mixed forests, that cover large areas of France, Germany and the Czech Republic and more moderately sized parts of Poland, Austria, Switzerland, Belgium and South Limburg (Netherlands). Luxembourg is also part of this ecoregion.

== Geography ==
The Western European broadleaf forests ecoregion covers an area of 492,357 km^{2} (190,100 sq mi), including the Massif Central, Central German Uplands, Jura Mountains, Bavarian Plateau, and Bohemian Massif.

This area has been inhabited for thousands of years and holds several large cities such as Lyon, Nancy and Munich. Most of the countryside has been cleared for agricultural land, cultivated with cereals (corn, wheat, oats), and to a smaller extent grapes. The ecoregion hosts a good variety of animal species, birds in particular, but most large mammals are in decline.

== Forests ==
The forest habitats of the ecoregion comprise mainly lowland and alti-montane mixed beech forests. There is also some natural beech woods, and the region also includes small parts of sub-Mediterranean forest habitats. The dominant trees in this forest are Quercus robur, Quercus petraea, Picea abies, Alnus glutinosa, Fagus sylvatica, Taxus baccata, Acer pseudoplatanus, Malus sylvestris, Viburnum lantana, Fraxinus excelsior, Tilia cordata, Aesculus hippocastanum, Rhamnus cathartica, Ulmus glabra, Ulmus minor, Populus alba, Salix alba, Pinus sylvestris, Betula pendula, Populus tremula, Populus nigra, Juglans regia, Juniperus communis, Prunus padus and Corylus avellana

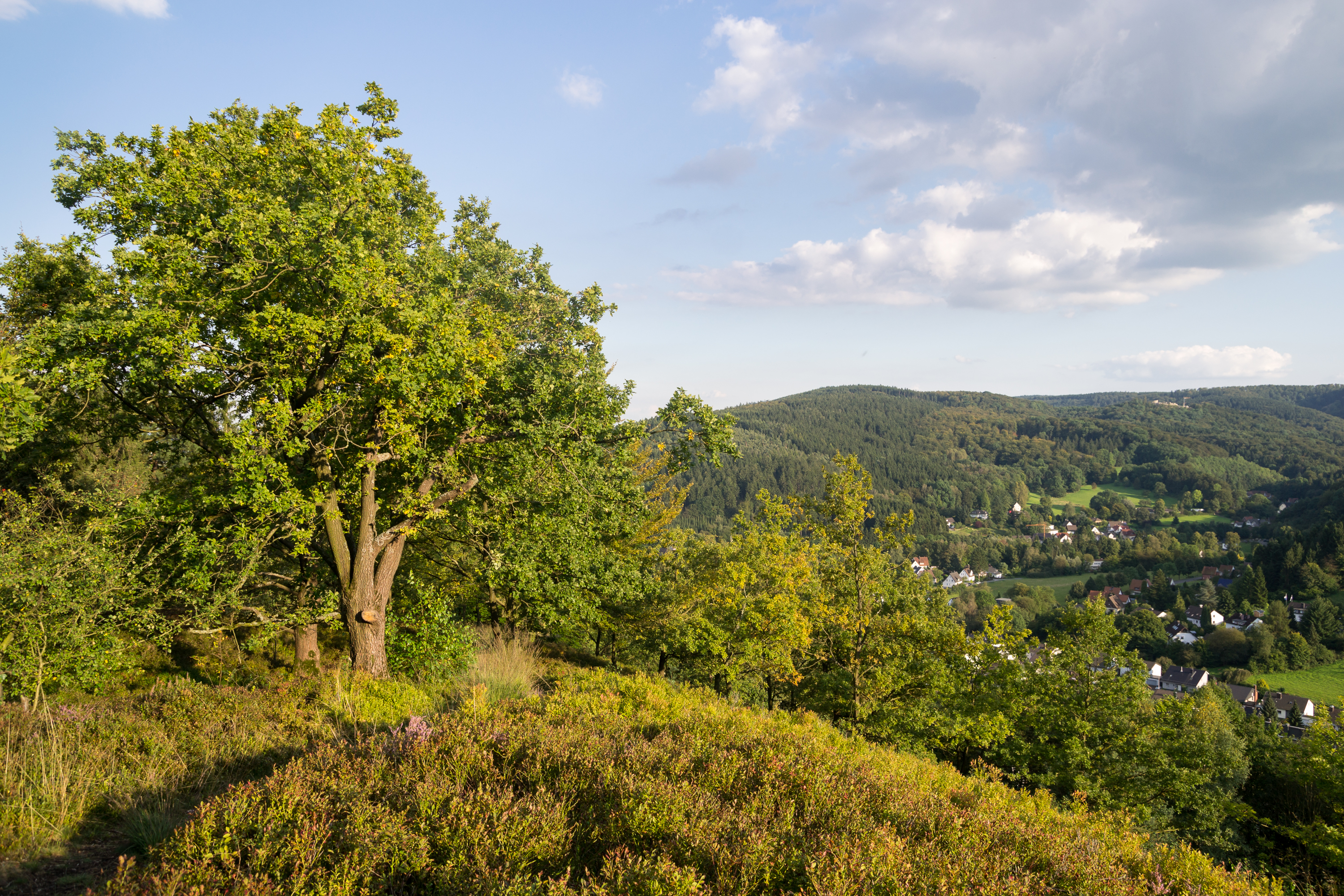
Broadleaf forests (Teutoburger Forest, Germany)

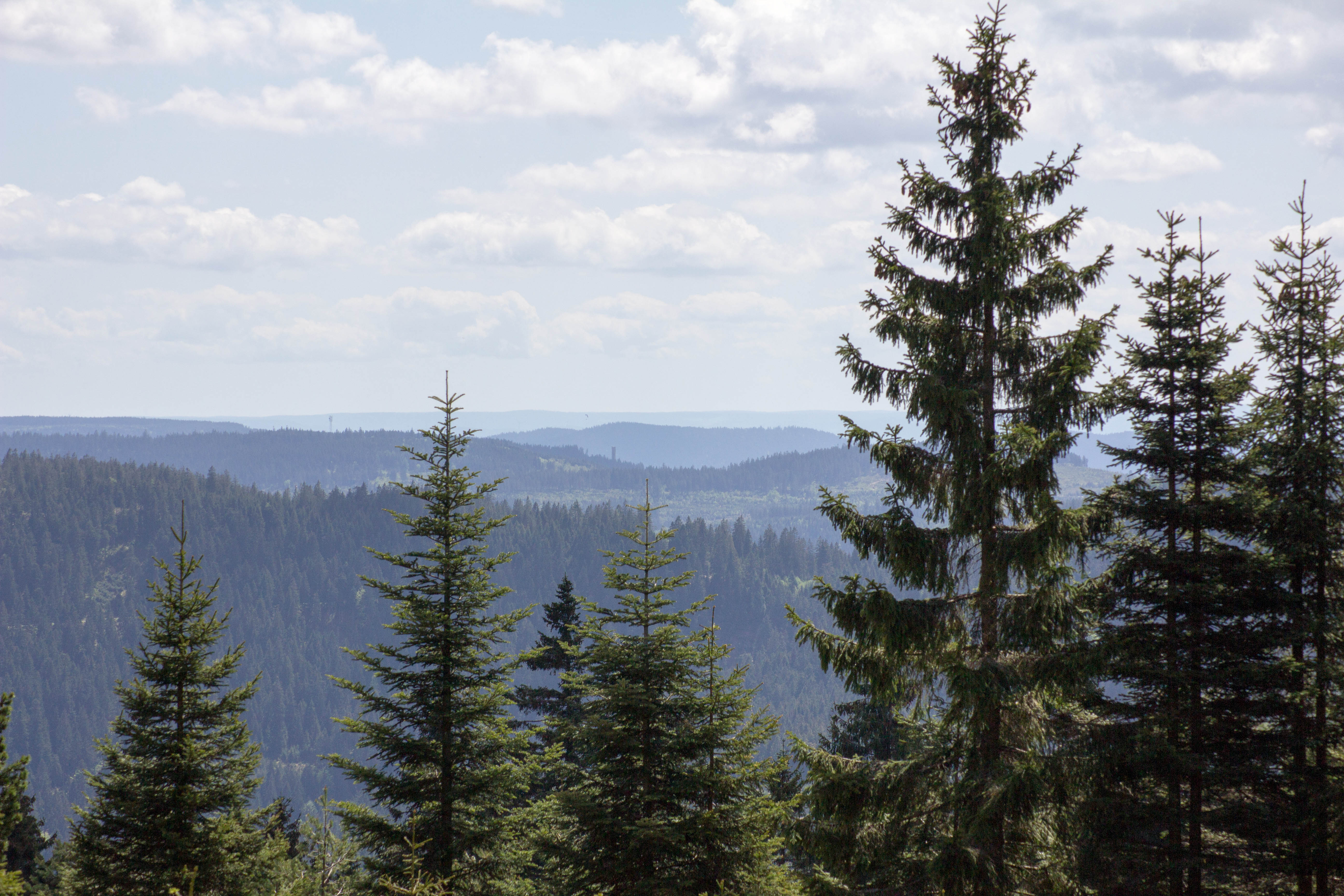
Conifer in the montane parts

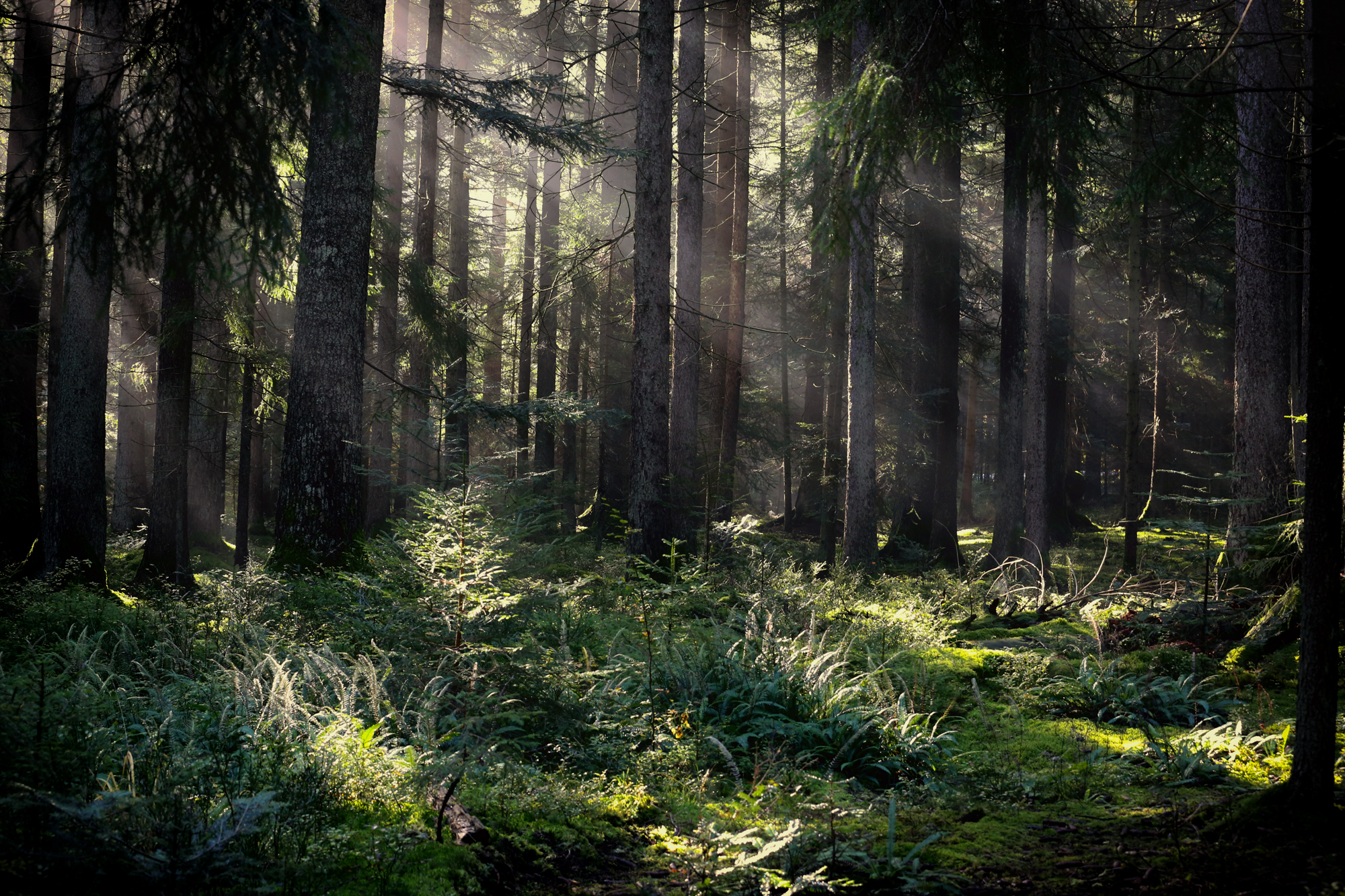
Inside the conifer forests (Black Forest, Germany)

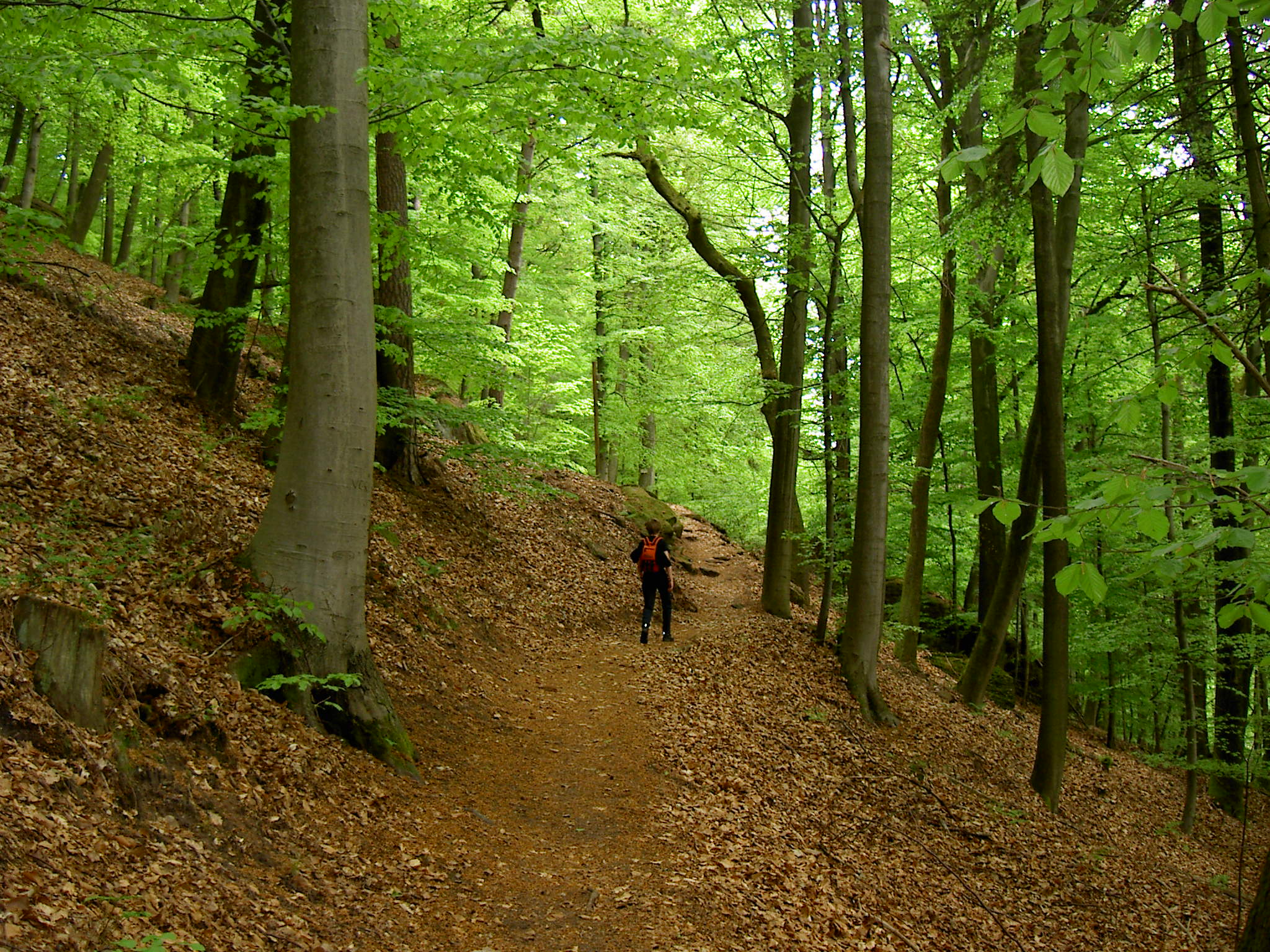
European beech is abundant in many submontane parts

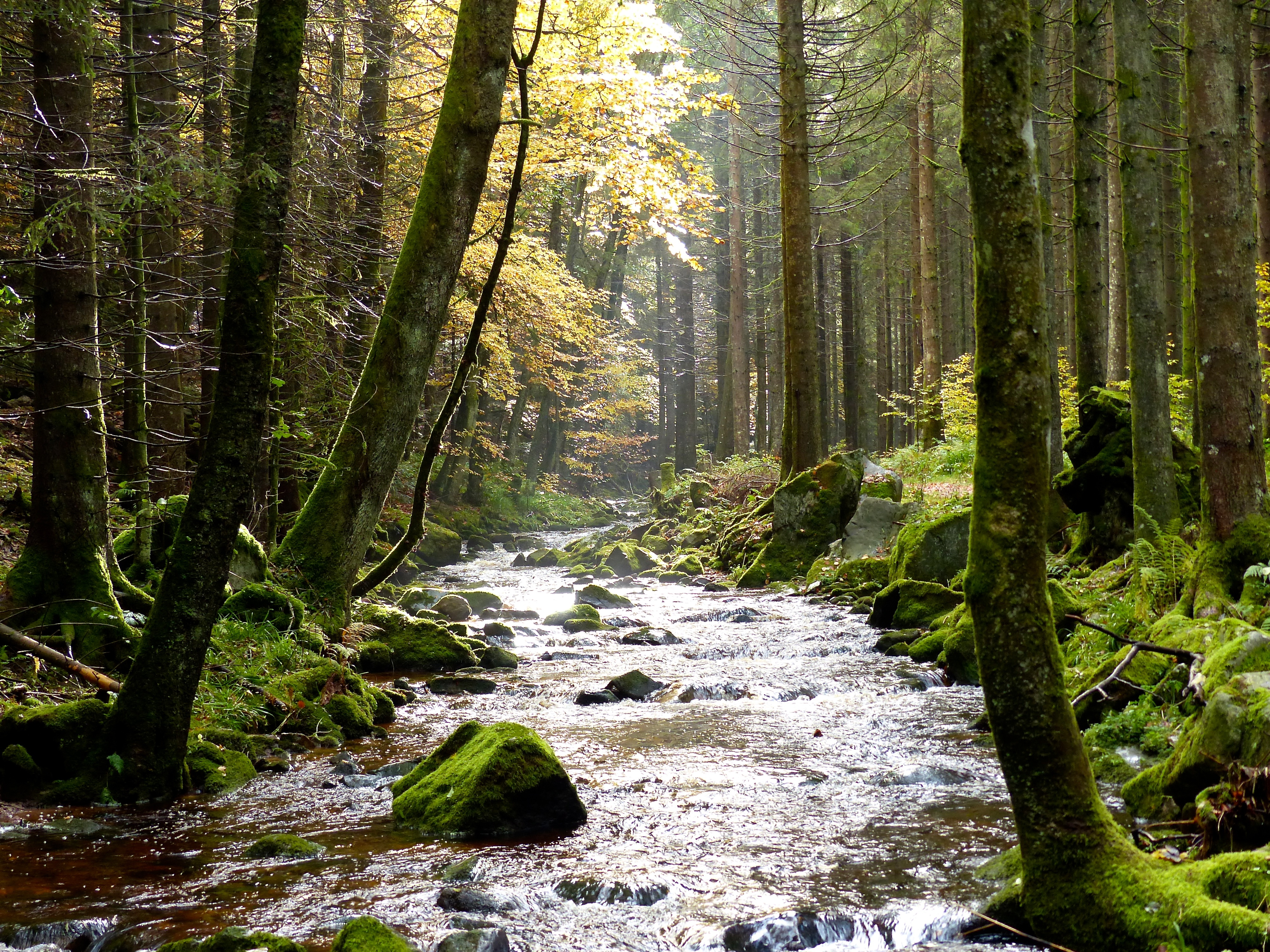
Mountain streams, rocky ground, and deciduous trees in a mix with conifer

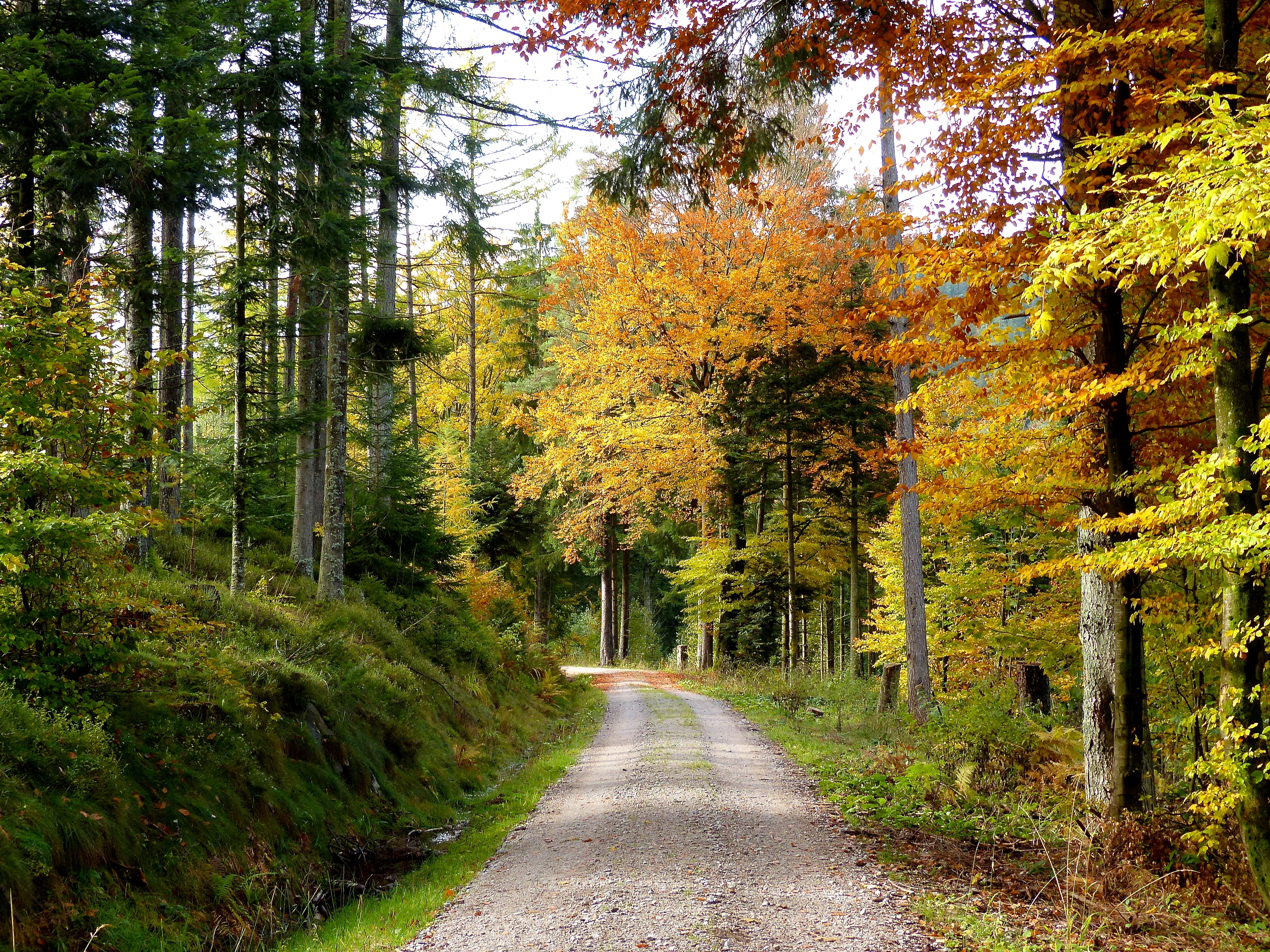
Autumn

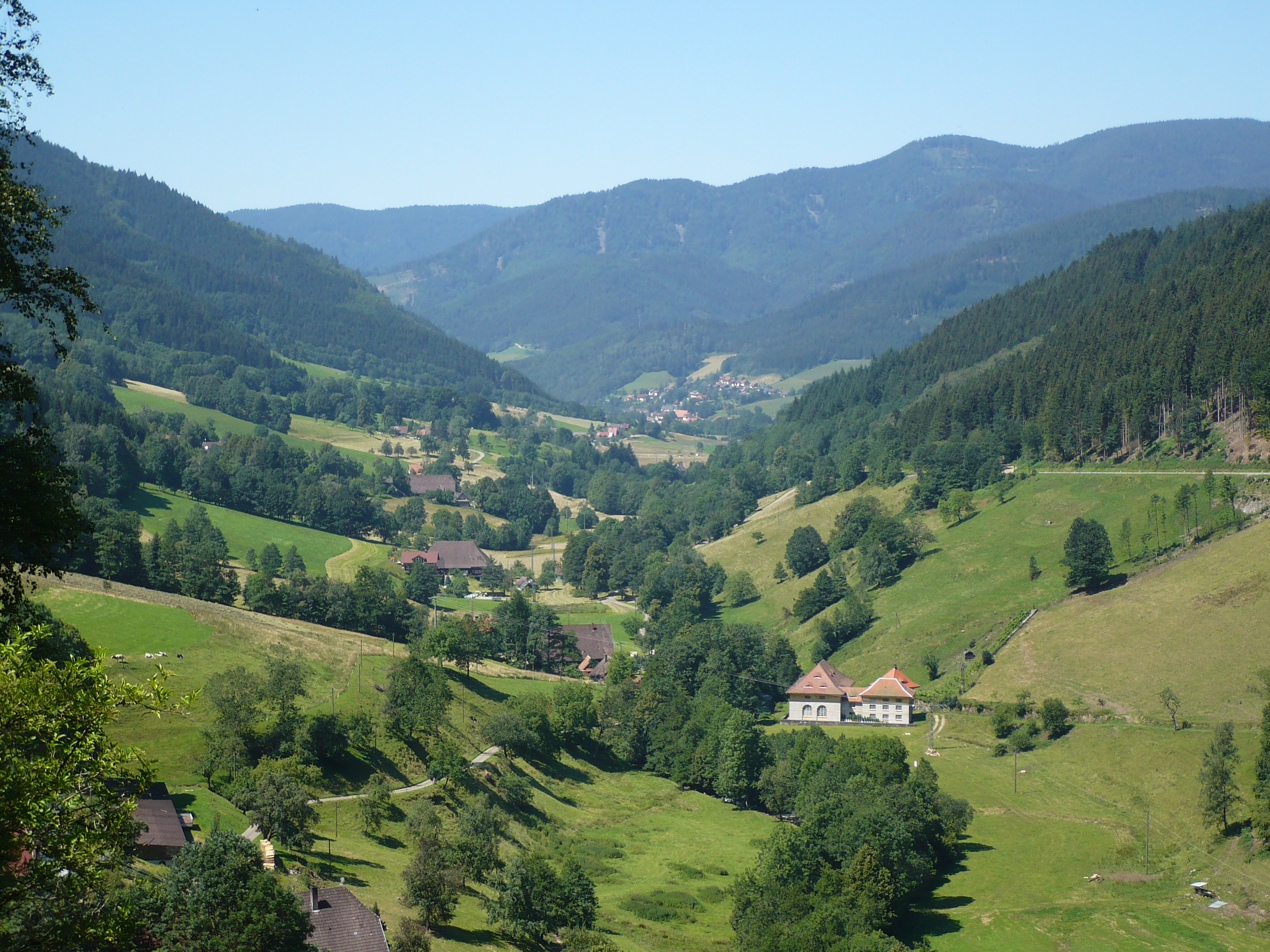
Many valleys have been cleared for villages and agriculture

== Fauna ==
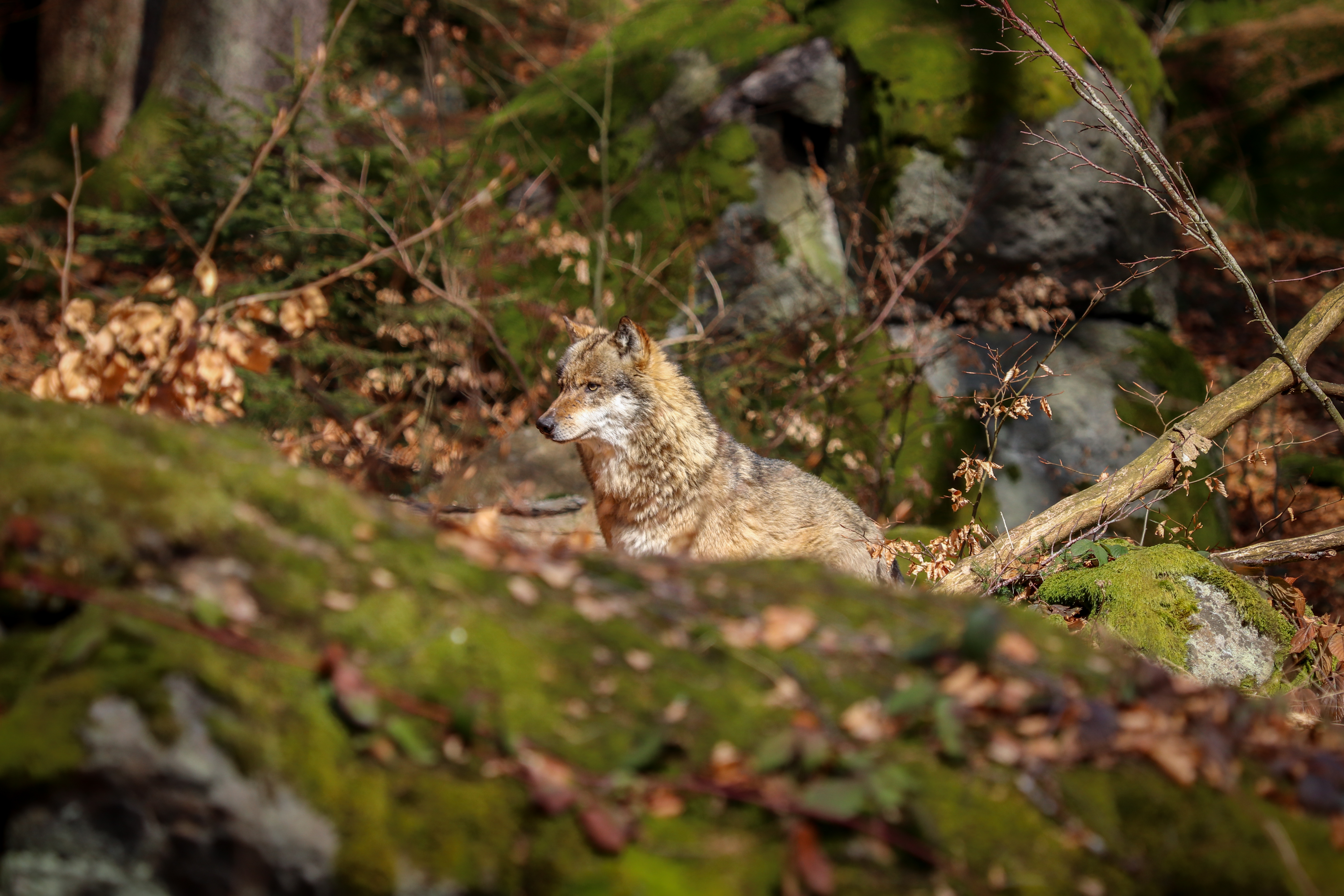
Wolf

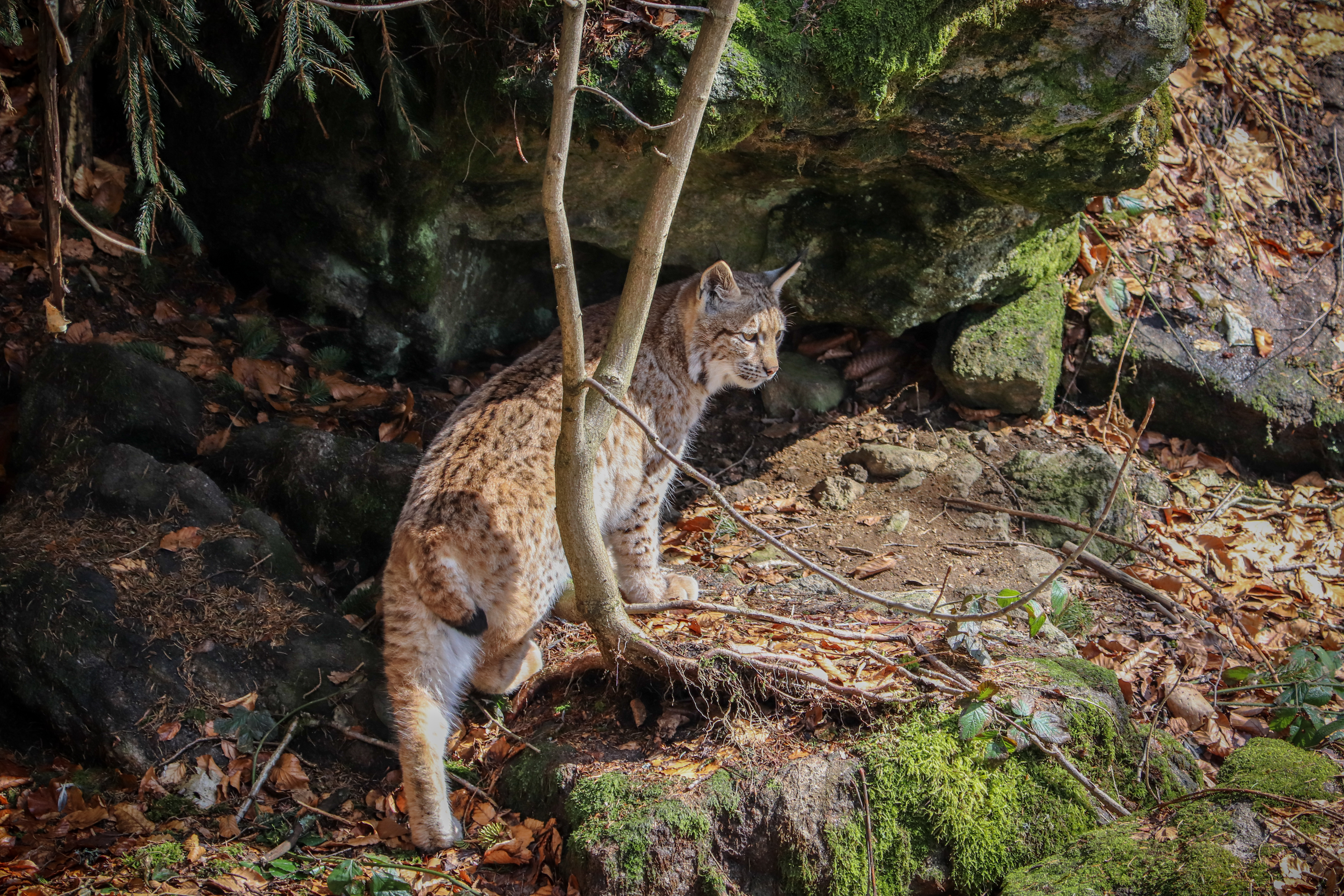
Lynx

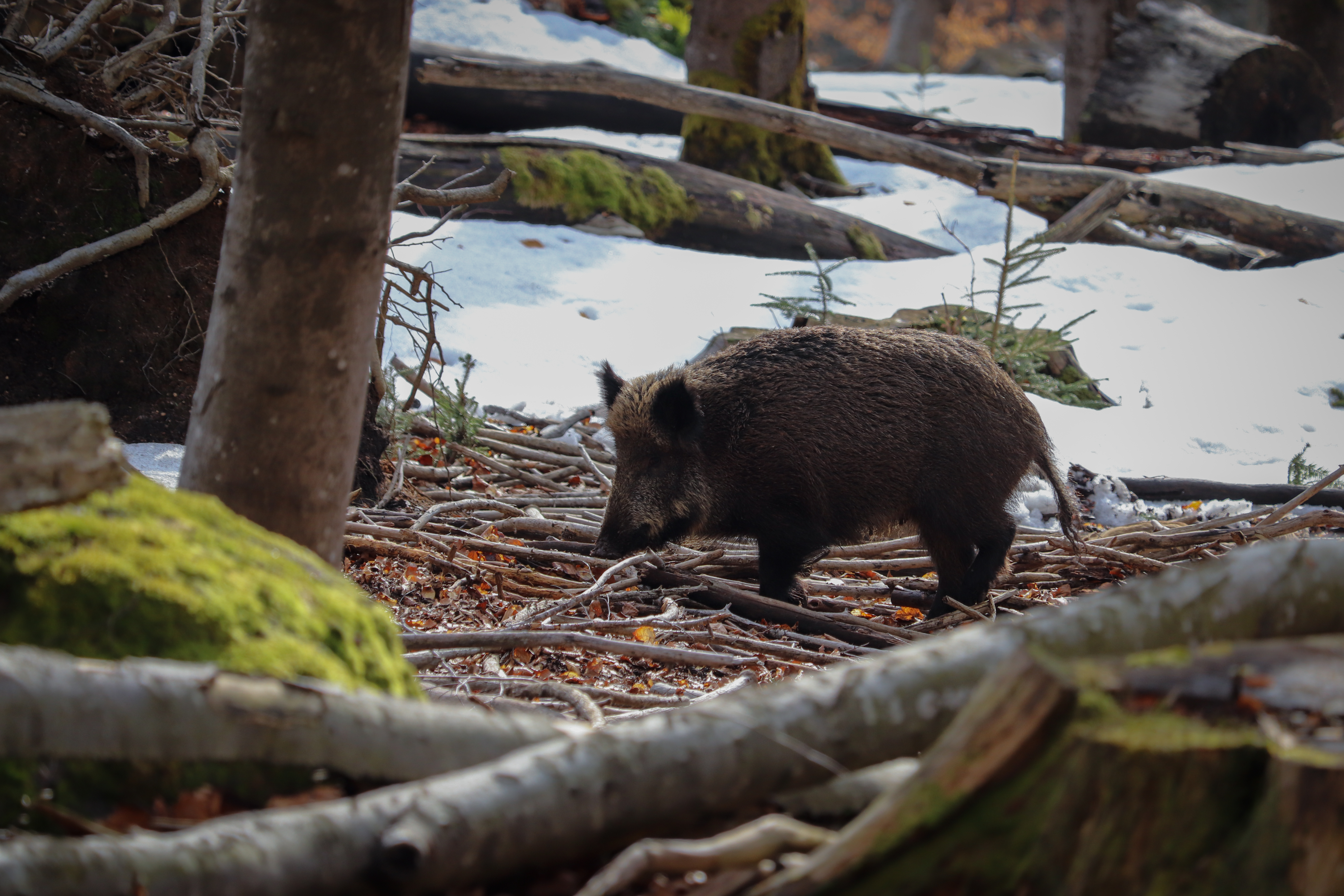
Wild boar

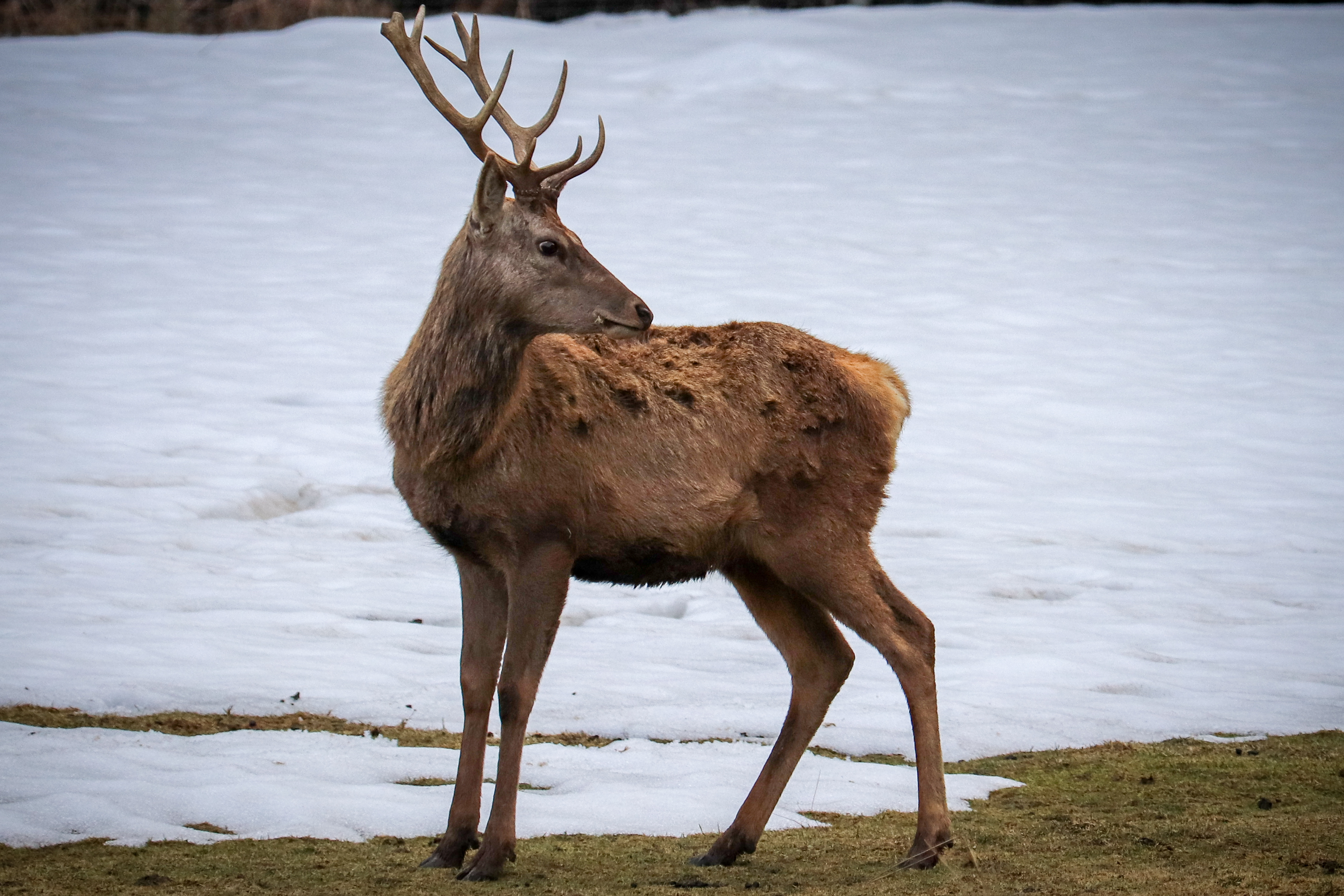
Stag

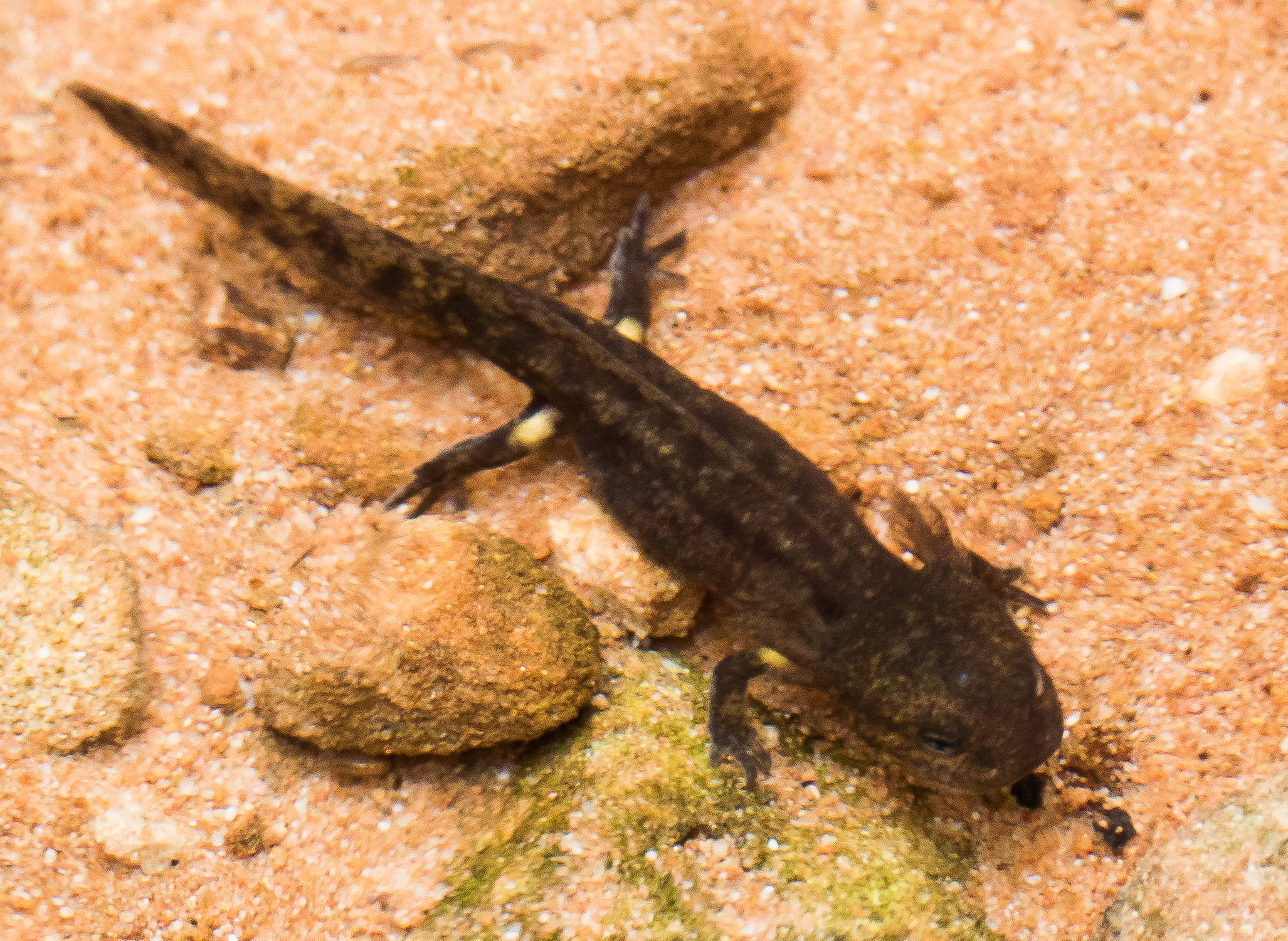
Fire salamander

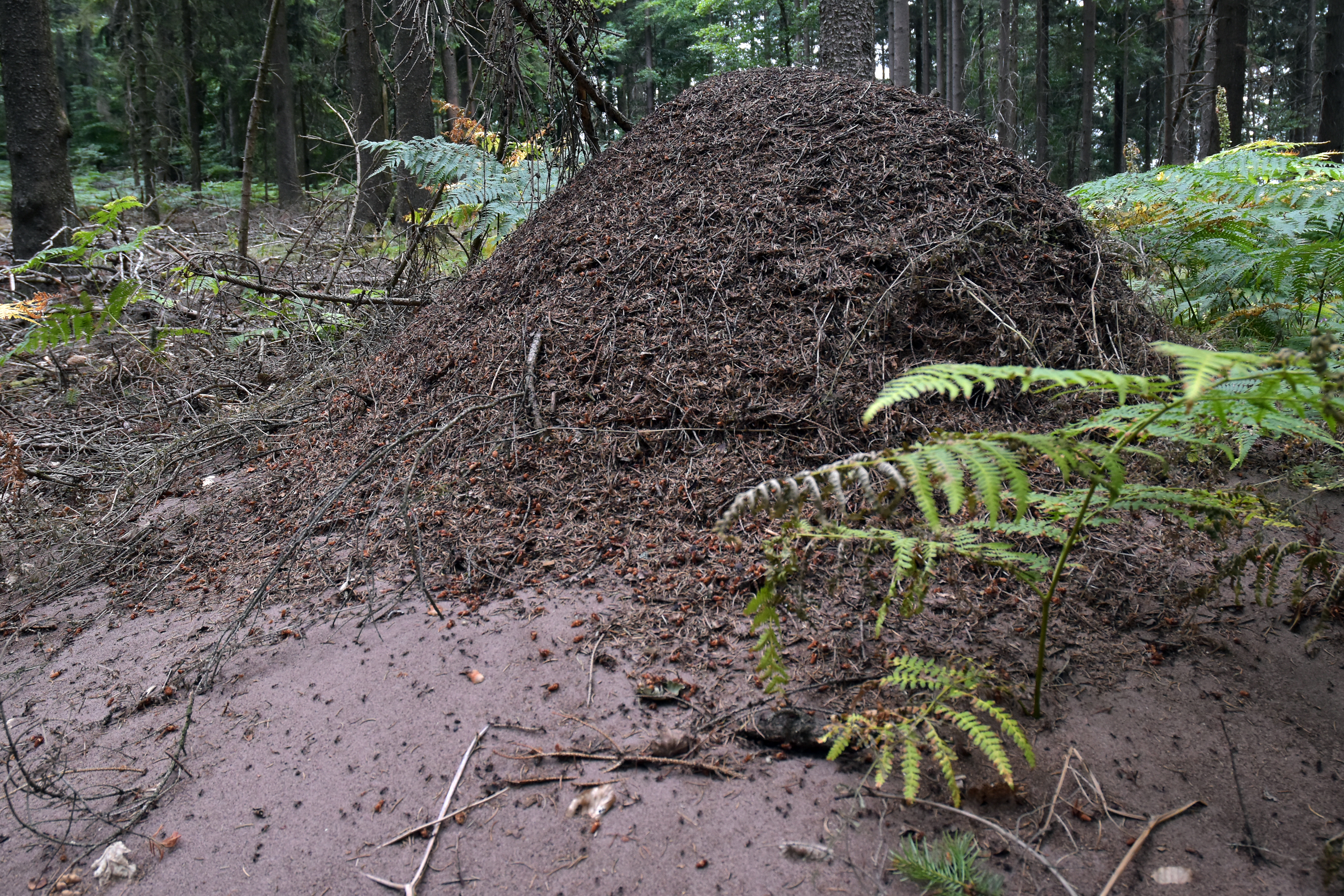
Anthill

== Status and conservation ==
Most of the original forest of the ecoregion has been cleared in the last 200 years, but a few larger patches remain, typically in non-arable montane areas that are part of national parks or protections. The woodlands of the ecoregion is generally second-growth and heavily fragmented.

National parks and larger nature protections in the ecoregion include:

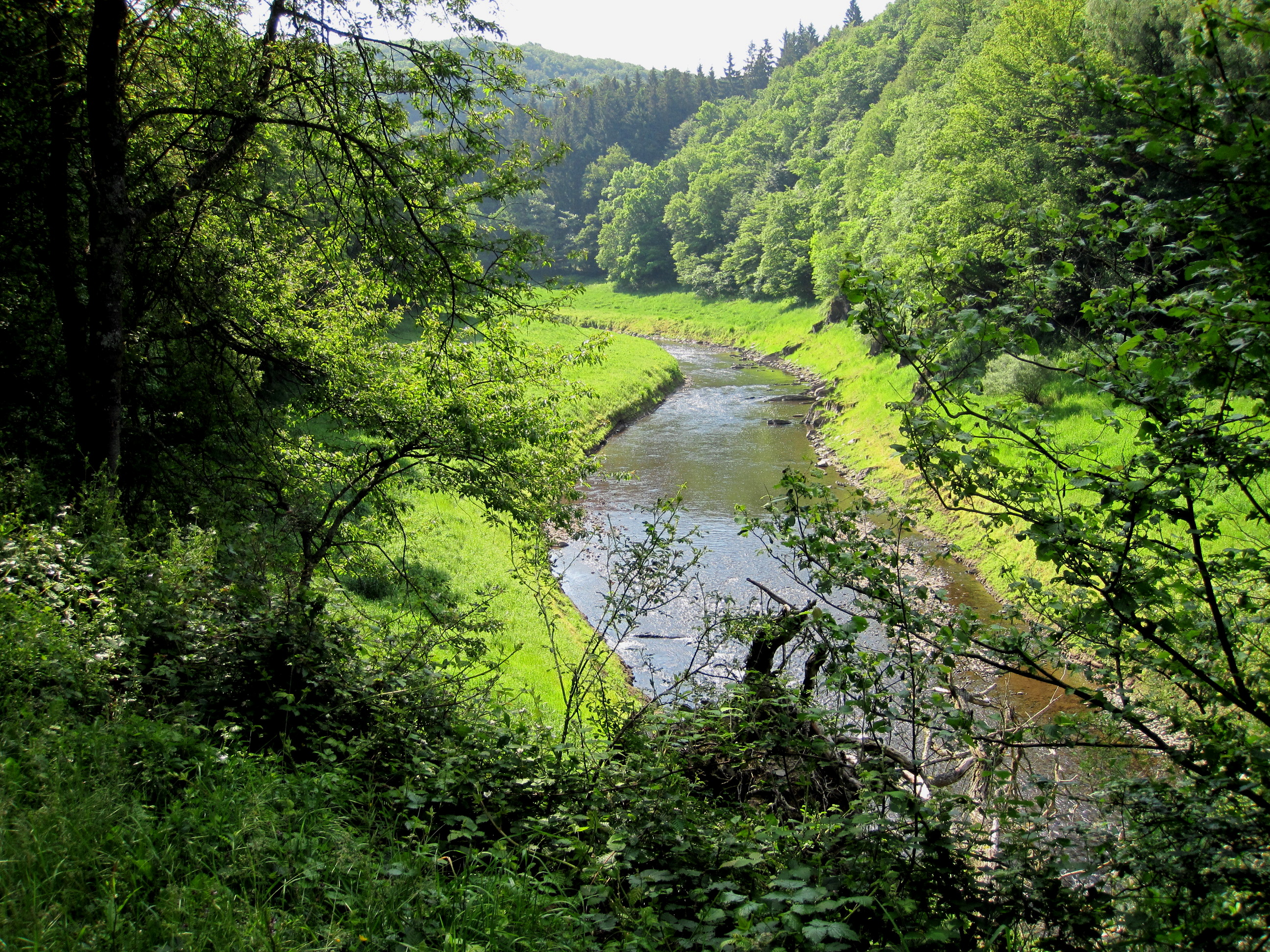
Eifel National Park

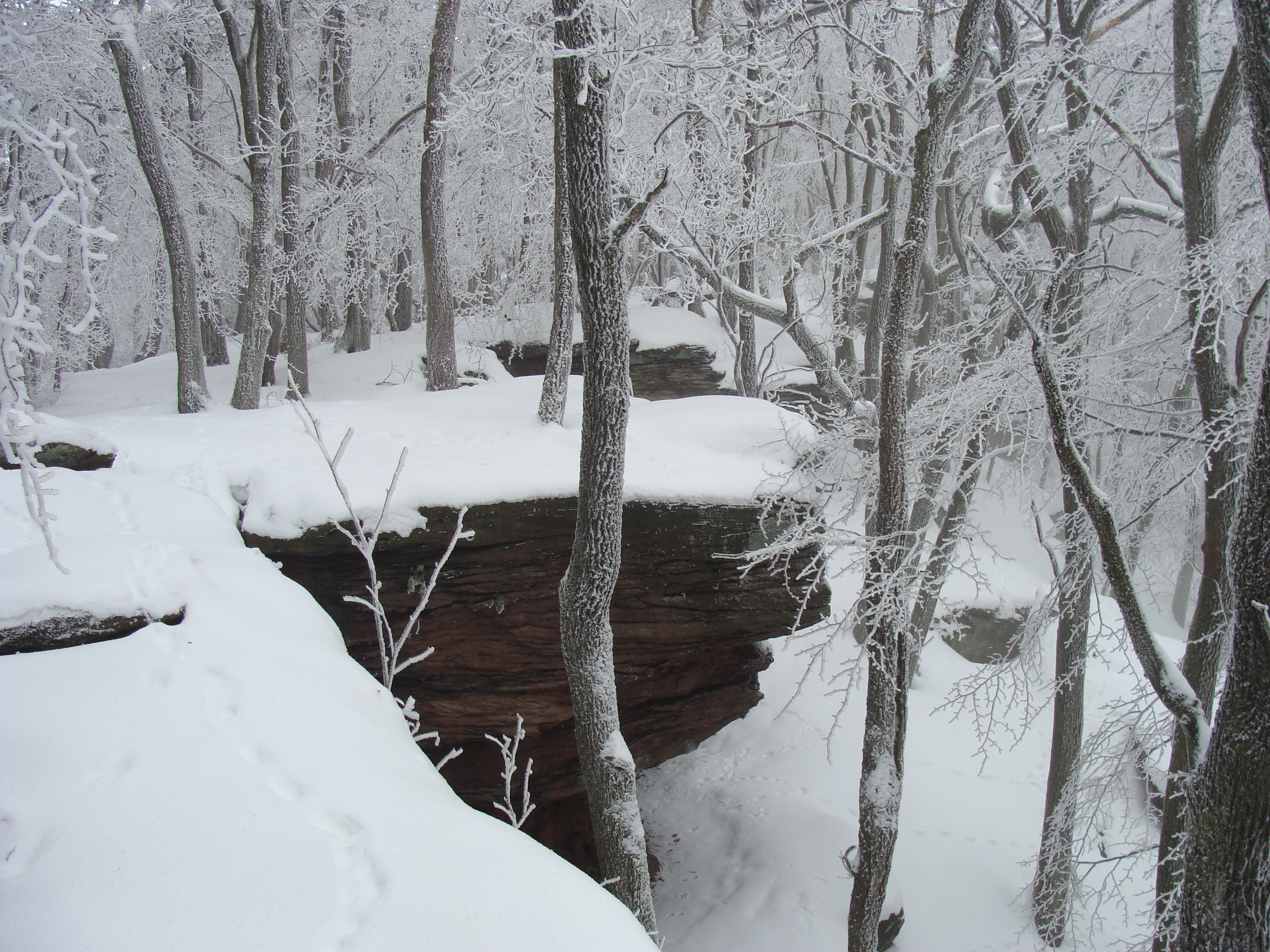
Winter. Palatinate Forest Nature Park.

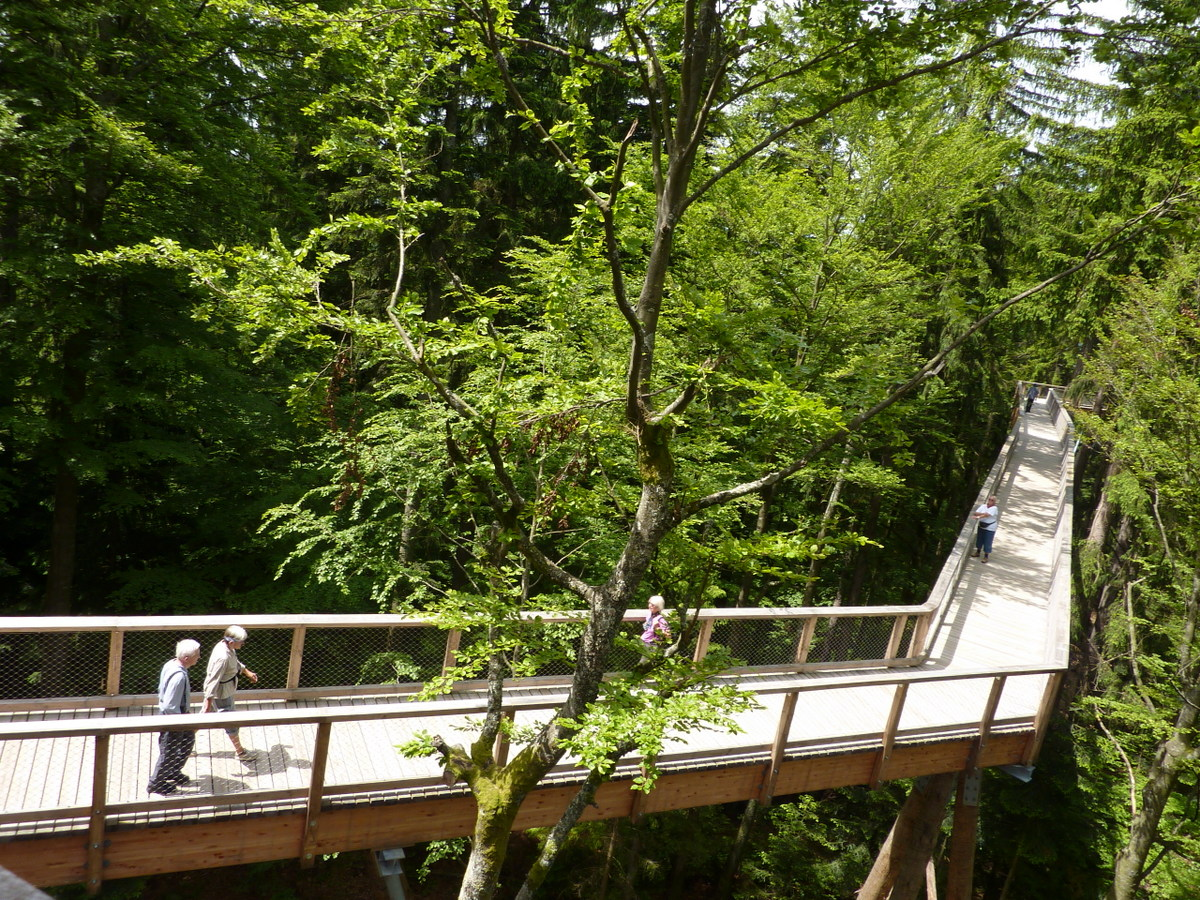
Canopy walkways in Bavarian Forest National Park

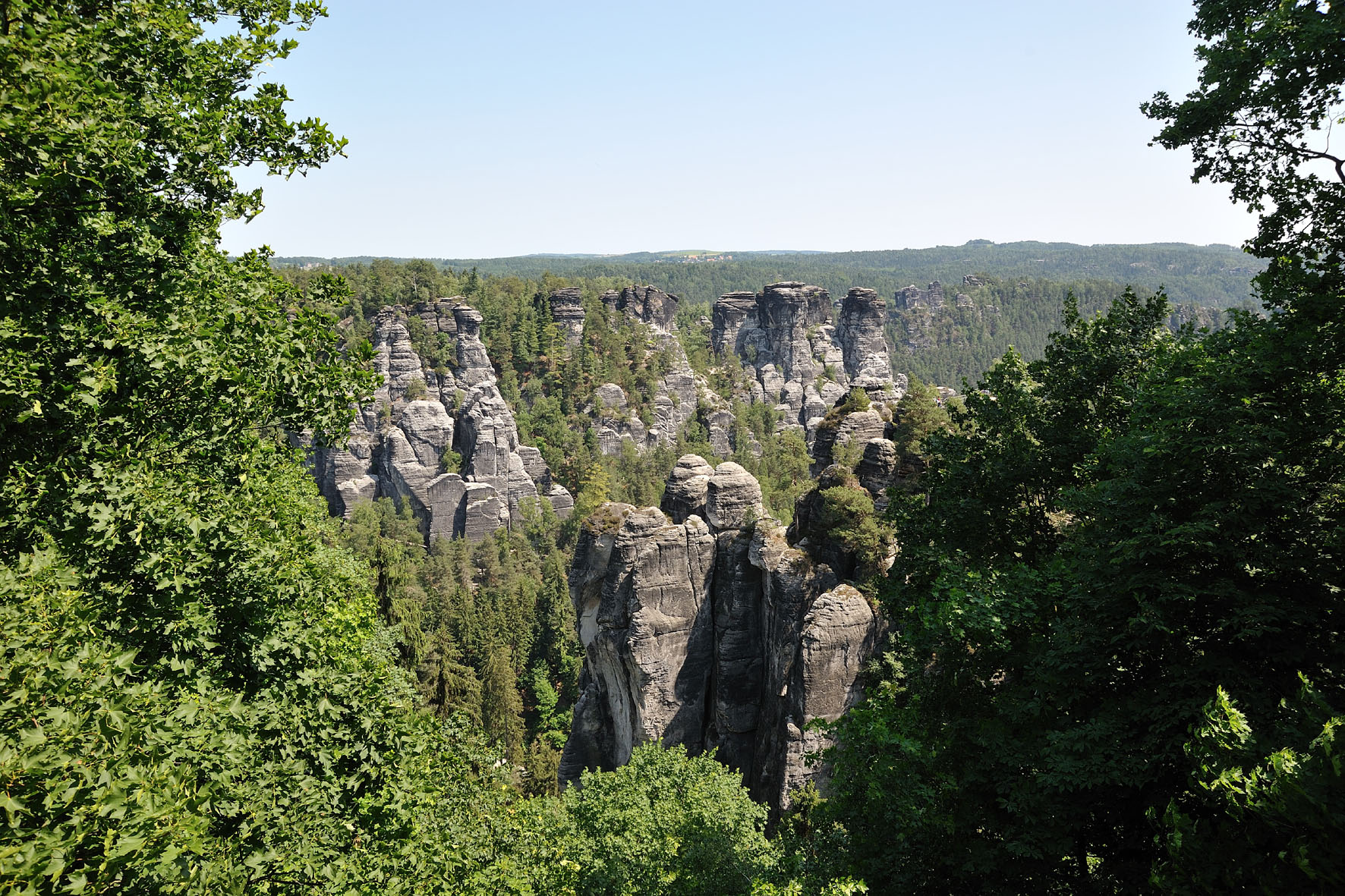
Elbe Sandstone Mountains

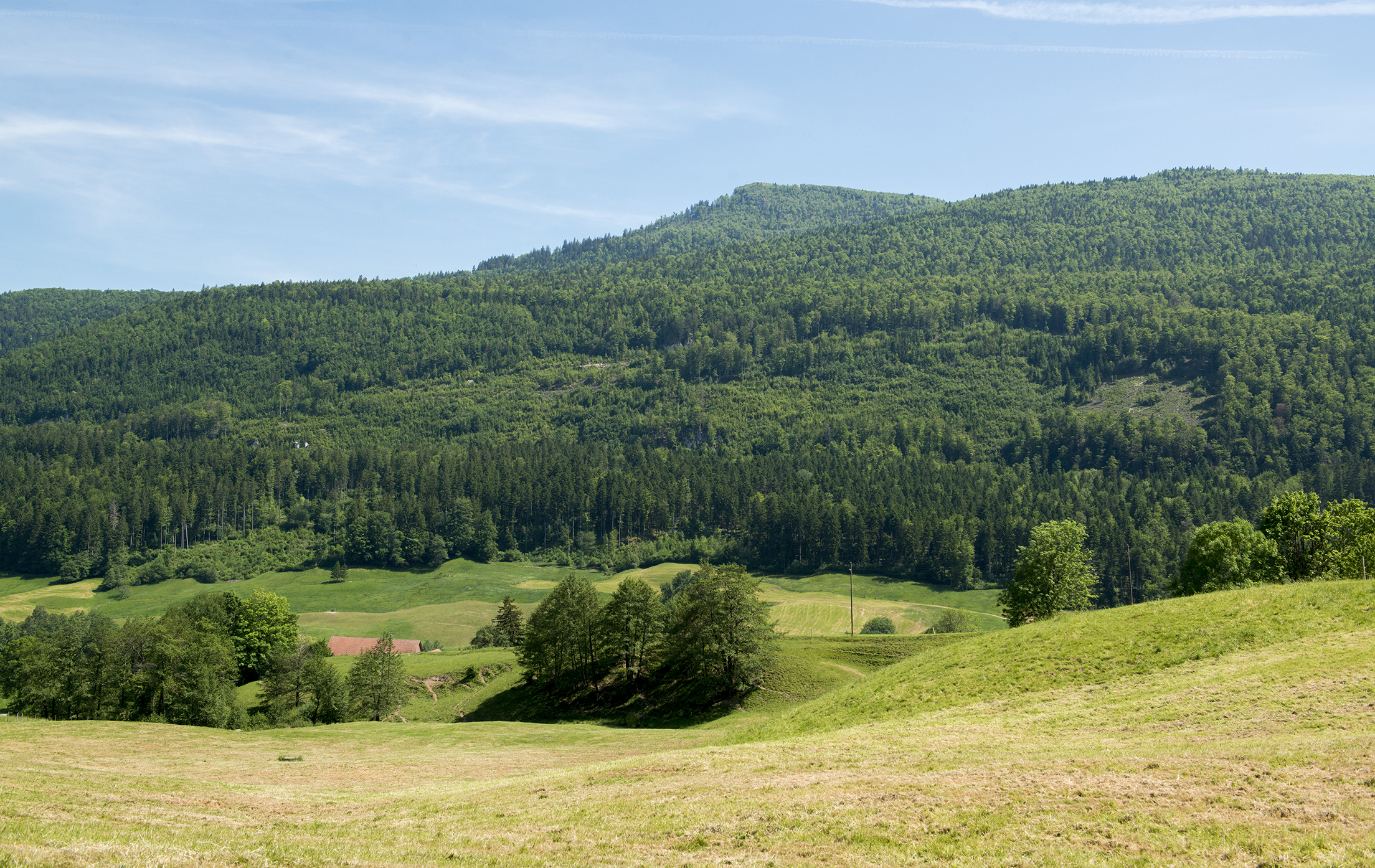
Thal Nature Park

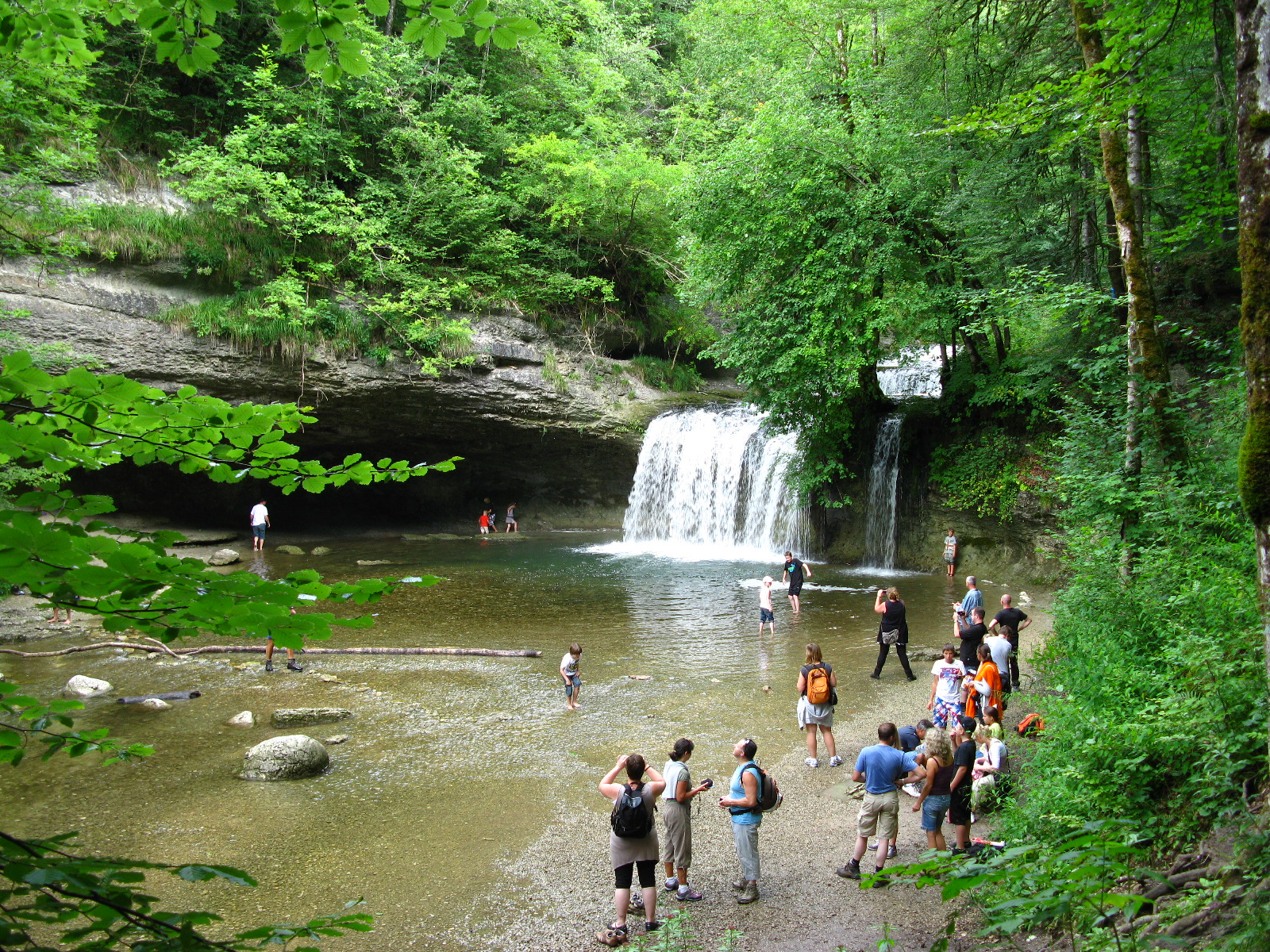
Waterfalls and gorges in Jura Mountains Regional Natural Park

Country	Name	Year	Area (km^{2})	IUCN category	Notes
Germany and Belgium	High Fens – Eifel Nature Park	1960	2,485	107 km^{2} is category II	Cross-border protection. Includes a Ramsar Wetland area since 2003. Includes the Eifel National Park established in 2004.
Germany and Luxembourg	German-Luxembourg Nature Park	1964	789		Cross-border protection.
Germany	Bergstraße-Odenwald Nature Park	1960	3,500		
Germany	Spessart Nature Park	1961	2,440		
Germany	Sauerland-Rothaargebirge Nature Park	2015	3,827		
Germany	Arnsberg Forest Nature Park	1960	482		
Germany	Teutoburg Forest / Egge Hills Nature Park	1965	2,700		
Germany	Thuringian Forest Nature Park	1979	2,200	337 km^{2} is category II	Includes a UNESCO biosphere reserve
Germany	Swabian-Franconian Forest Nature Park		1,270		
Germany	Central/North Black Forest Nature Park		3,750	101 km^{2} is category II	Includes the Black Forest National Park established in 2014.
Germany	Southern Black Forest Nature Park	1999	3,940		
Germany and France	Palatinate Forest-North Vosges Biosphere Reserve	1992	3,018		Cross-border protection. UNESCO biosphere reserve. A fusion of Palatinate Forest Nature Park (Germany) and Northern Vosges Regional Nature Park (France).
Germany	Franconian Switzerland-Veldenstein Forest Nature Park	1995	2,346		
Germany	Bavarian Forest National Park	1970	243	Category II	The park connects with the Šumava National Park in Czech Republic
Germany	Altmühl Valley Nature Park	1969	2,962		
Germany	Augsburg Western Woods Nature Park	1988	1,175		
Belgium	Two Ourthes Nature Park	2001	760		
Belgium	Upper Sure Anlier Forest Nature Park	2001	720		
Belgium	Gaume Natural Park	2014	581		
Belgium	Viroin-Hermeton Nature Park		120		
Belgium	Attert Valley Nature Park	1994	71		
Czech Republic and Germany	Elbe Sandstone Mountains	1956	783	173 km^{2} is category II	A collection of several protections, including Bohemian Switzerland National Park and Saxon Switzerland National Park.
Czech Republic and Germany	Lusatian Mountains	1976	397		The Czech parts of these mountains forms the Lusatian Mountains Protected Landscape Area and the smaller German part forms the Zittau Mountain Nature Park.
Czech Republic	Bohemian Paradise	1955	181		
Czech Republic	Jizera Mountains Protected Landscape Area	1968	368		
Czech Republic	Krkonoše National Park	1963	550	Category II	UNESCO biosphere reserve. Connects with Karkonosze National Park in Poland
Czech Republic	Broumovsko Protected Landscape Area	1991	430	Category V	
Czech Republic	Orlické Mountains Protected Landscape Area	1969	204	Category V	
Czech Republic	Jeseníky Protected Landscape Area	1969	740	Category V	
Czech Republic	Žďár Highlands Protected Landscape Area	1970	709	Category V	
Czech Republic	Třeboňsko Protected Landscape Area	1979	700		UNESCO biosphere reserve. Includes two Ramsar Wetland areas.
Czech Republic	Blanský Forest Protected Landscape Area	1990	212		
Czech Republic	Šumava National Park	1991	681	Category II	The park connects with the Bavarian Forest National Park in Germany. UNESCO biosphere reserve.
Czech Republic	Bohemian Forest Protected Landscape Area	2005	473		
Czech Republic	Slavkov Forest	1974	606		
Poland	Karkonosze National Park	1959	56	Category II	Connects with Krkonoše National Park in Czech Republic
Poland	Bóbr Valley Landscape Park	1989	109	Category V	
Poland	Rudawy Landscape Park	1989	157	Category V	
Poland	Chełmy Landscape Park	1992	160	Category V	
Poland	Sudety Wałbrzyskie Landscape Park	1998	65	Category V	
Poland	Owl Mountains Landscape Park	1991	81	Category V	
Poland	Stołowe Mountains National Park	1993	63	Category II	
Switzerland	Parc Jura vaudois				
Switzerland	Doubs Nature Park				
Switzerland	Chasseral Regional Park				
Switzerland	Thal Nature Park				
Switzerland	Aargau Jura Park	2012	241		
Switzerland	Schaffhausen Regional Nature Park				
France	The Ardennes Regional Nature Park	2001	1,172		
France	Lorraine Regional Natural Park	1974	2,050		
France	Ballons des Vosges Nature Park	1989	2,700		
France	The IllWald, regional nature reserve	2013	19		
France	Jura Mountains Regional Natural Park	1986	1,641		
France	The Bauges Massif Regional Nature Park	1995	856		
France	Chartreuse Regional Nature Park	1995	767		
France	Grands Causses Natural Regional Park	1995	3,285		
France	Aubrac Natural Regional Park	1967	2,207		
France	Auvergne Volcanos Regional Park	1977	3,950		
France	Morvan Regional Natural Park	1970	2,850		
France	Millevaches Regional Nature Park in Limousin	2004	3,140		
France	Forêt d'Orient Regional Nature Park	1970	820		
France	Forêts National Park	2019	2,500		

Luxembourg maintains the Upper Sûre Natural Park, but this park covers mostly the Upper Sûre Lake, an artificial dam created in 1959, and no land area of significance. The lake is an important bird area. Luxembourg also holds part of the cross-border German-Luxembourg Nature Park in addition to several smaller nature reservations. Here eco-typical patches of forest are growing.

Austria does not have any protections in this ecoregion.
