= Linnerberg (Aargau) =

Mountain in Canton Aargau, Switzerland

- Linnberg
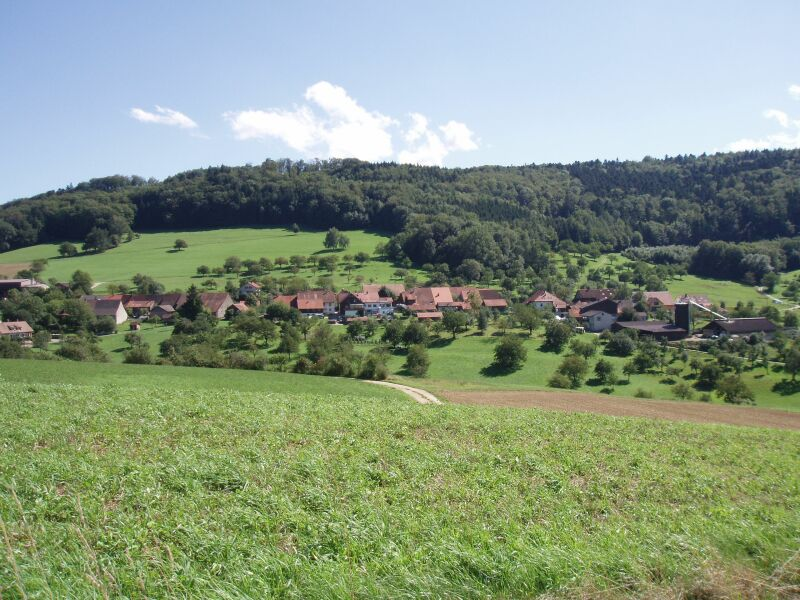
- The Linnerberg above the village of Linn

Highest point
- Elevation: 757 m (2,484 ft)
- Prominence: 650m
- Coordinates: 47°27′47.45″N 8°7′25.39″E

Geography
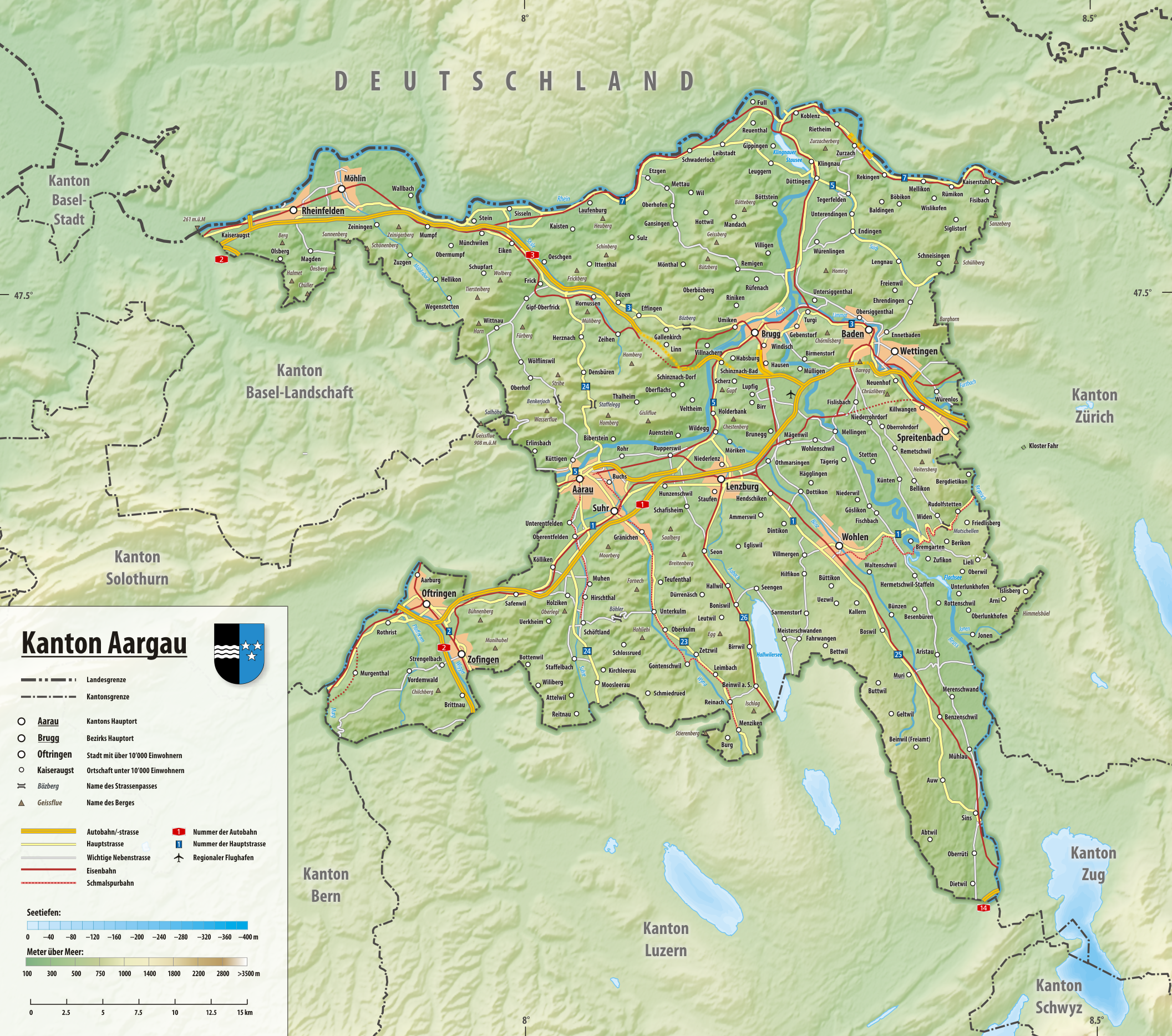
- Location within Canton of Aargau
- Location: Canton of Aargau, Switzerland
- Parent range: Jura (mountains)

The Linnerberg, formerly also known as Linnberg, is a mountain located 757 meters above sea level in the Aargau Jura. It lies within the boundaries of the regional nature park Jurapark Aargau and stands as one of the highest peaks in the Brugg district. Together with the Gisliflue, which is located four kilometers further south, it constitutes the eastern terminus of the Faltenjura mountain range.

== Geography and geology ==
Around Linn, open fields in the "Zelgli" and "Nunnematt" regions extend up to an altitude of 640 meters above sea level. Within the mountain forest, larger clearings are situated at the Chalchdere and Beliberg farms. The management of the forests on the Linnerberg is overseen by the Brugg forestry operation on the northern flank and the Homberg-Schenkenberg forestry operation in the south and west.

The Linnerberg is almost completely covered by forest and reaches the cultivated land with lower-lying slopes in the north, east and south. The southeastern slope of the mountain promontory features the lower areas known as Grund and Chalm, which are home to the vineyards of Schinznach spanning over 50 hectares and with a history dating back centuries. In 1859, these winegrowers came together to establish a winegrowing society, and in 1895, they further established the Schinznach Winegrowers' Cooperative. Within the vicinity of the Linnerberg, the Kasteln Castle, built in the 17th century, graces a hillside terrace and stands as a significant historical edifice.

== Geology ==
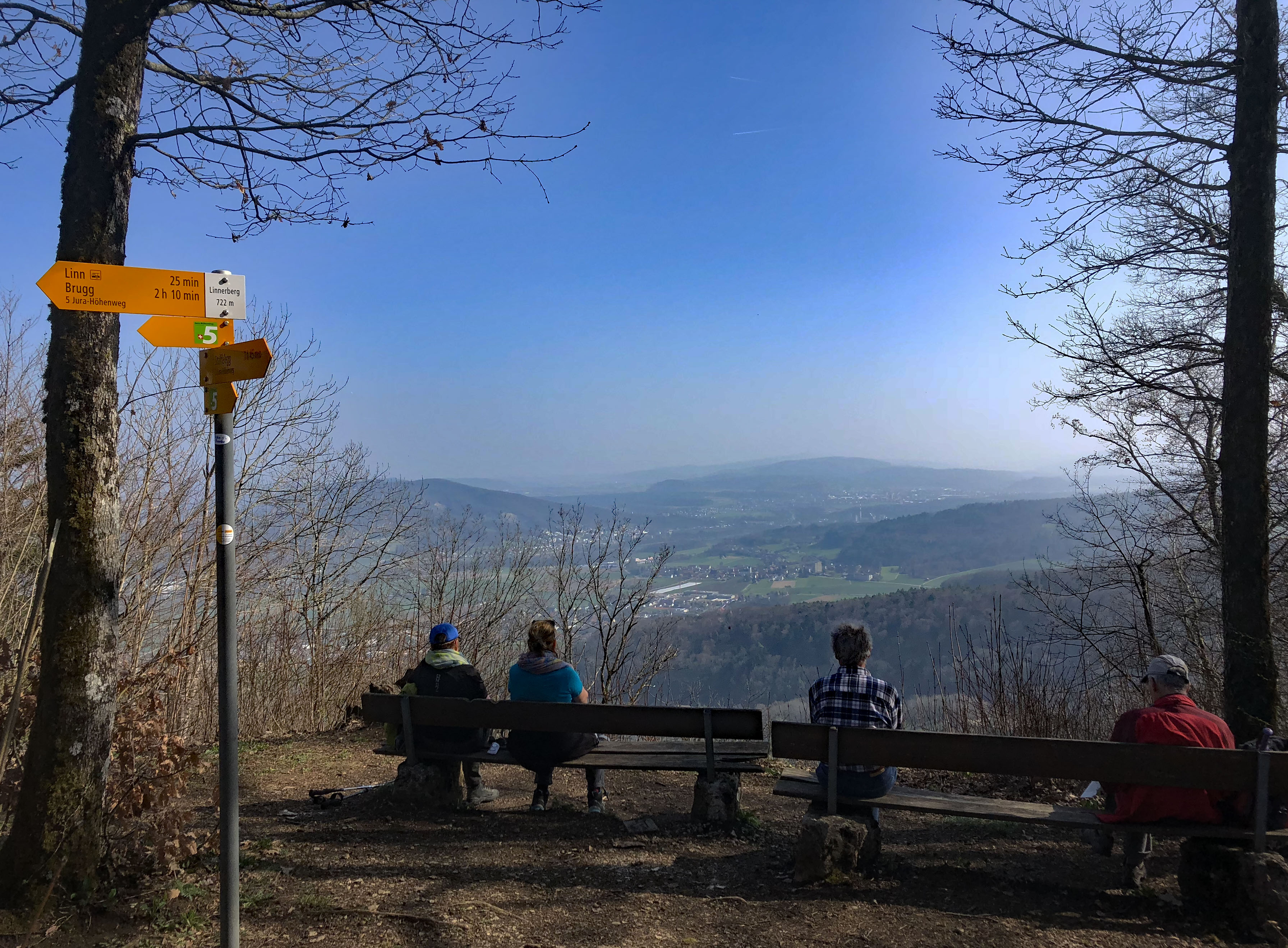
View from the Linnerberg over the Aare valley

During the formation of mountains, several prominent hilltops emerged within the fracture zone near Schinznach due to the main Jura overthrust, including the Linnerbergschuppe. Tectonic forces pushed the Grund mountain range to the south and the Bözenegg-Schuppe against these formations. The demarcation between the Faltenjura and the Tafeljura is delineated in this region.

In the Linnerberg area, the geological composition comprises multiple layers of shell limestone, anhydrite, dolomite, opalinus Clay, and gypsum keuper. The fissured and water-bearing rock strata of the Linnerberg, along with its northern slope encompassing the village settlement of Linn, are part of the catchment zone for the springs of Bad Schinznach and are situated within the thermal protection area. The groundwater from the Linnerberg flows through shell limestone layers into the Aare valley and there meets the hot deep groundwater, which flows from the south through the crystalline bedrock and reaches the surface in the Klus of Wallbach.

On the eastern side of the Dreierberg, a unique geotope on the mountain slope is the erosion form of a sinkhole, which is otherwise rare in this area of the Jurassic and was formed as a karst feature after the collapse of gypsum layers. This site is known by the field name Täuferchile.

The northern slope of the Linnerberg lies to the south of the "Jura Ost" study area, which the National Cooperative for the Disposal of Radioactive Waste investigated through deep boreholes with the intention of assessing a potential repository for low- and intermediate-level waste in 2020. The sedimentary rock Opalinus Clay, which is also present in rock layers at Linnerberg and occurs in the subsurface of the Plateaujura to the north at a depth of about 600 meters with significant thickness, was examined by the Swiss Federal Nuclear Safety Inspectorate as a potential environment for the planned deep repository. The study was conducted by the Swiss Federal Nuclear Safety Inspectorate.

== Transport geography ==
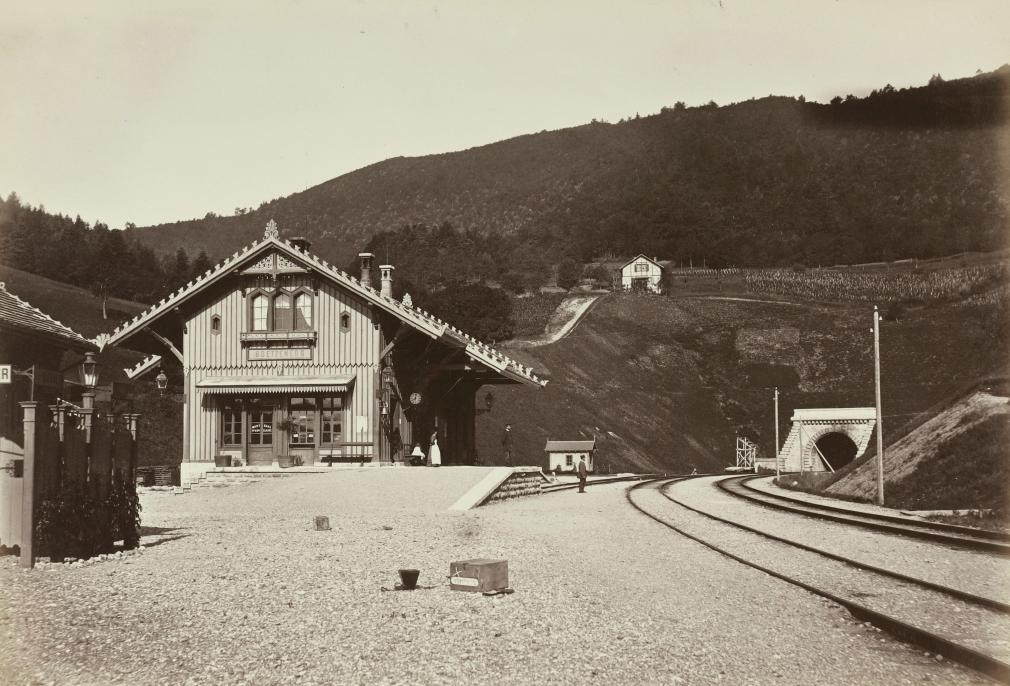
Bözberg station (today Schinznach Dorf) with the old tunnel portal under the Linnerberg

Two significant major traffic routes in northwestern Switzerland cross the Jura mountains through the Linnerberg region. The Bözberg railway line operated by the Swiss Federal Railways originates from Brugg and ascends the slope of the Linnerberg on an incline, entering the Längebachtal and reaching the Bözenegg station. This station serves as the location for the eastern portals of both the new and the old Bözberg railway tunnels, each 2526 meters in length. The railway line then proceeds to reach the Fricktal region via the Effingen station. Additionally, at Villnachern, the railway line intersects a spur extending from the mountain, passing through the 184-meter-long Villnachern tunnel. The construction of the first railway tunnel in the 1870s was of utmost importance in enhancing the understanding of the intricate geological conditions present in the Linnerberg area.

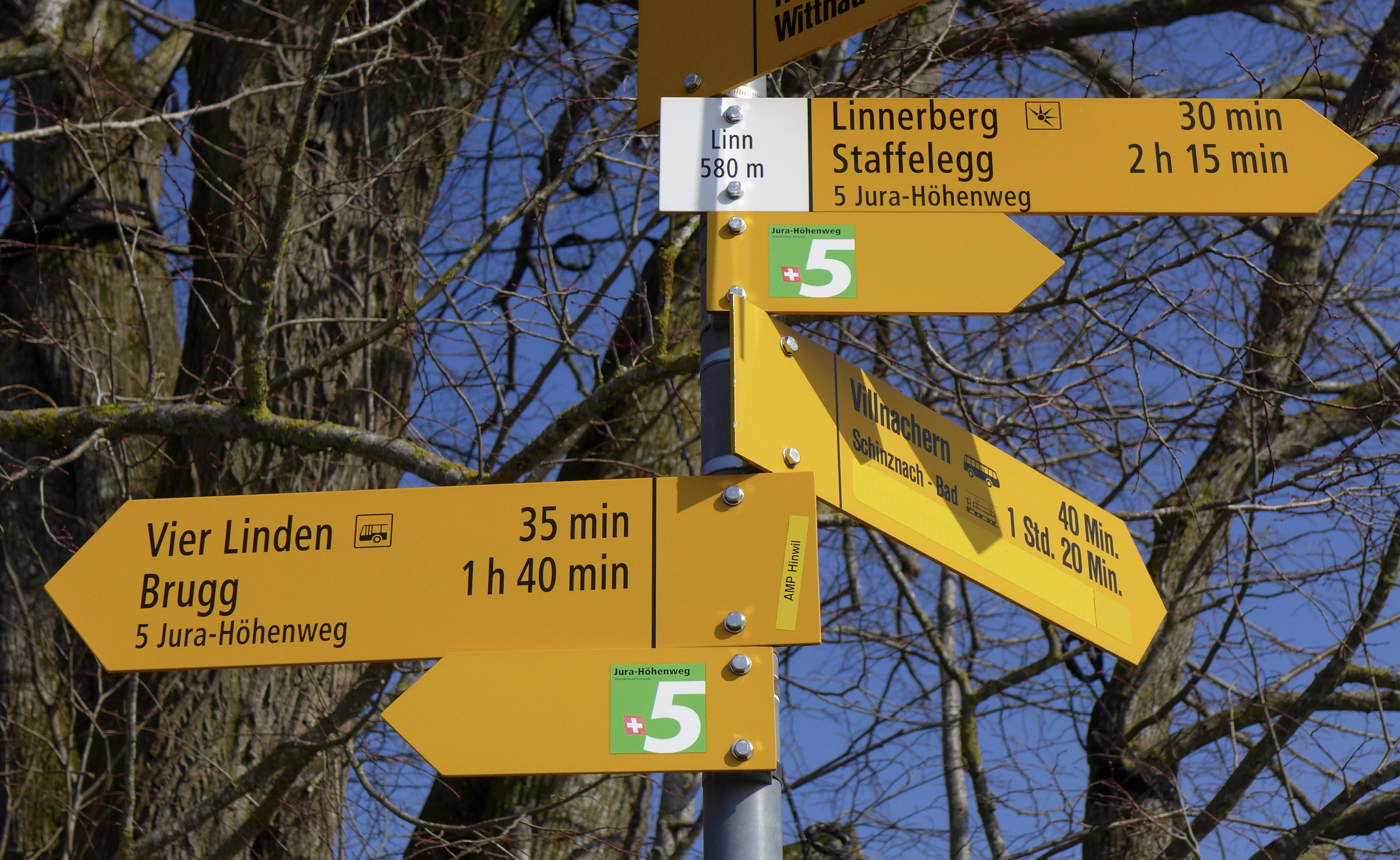
Signpost by Linn's linden tree

The A3 highway features the Bözberg Tunnel, spanning a length of 3,700 meters, which runs in close parallel to the railway tunnels within the mountain massif. The tunnel's eastern portal is situated at Bözhalde, north of Schinznach-Dorf, while its western portal is located near the Effingen railway station in the Fricktal region.

The forested region is accessible via an array of forest roads. Numerous hiking trails lead over the mountain, including the Jura-Höhenweg long-distance hiking route, which extends from the renowned natural landmark Linner Linde to the ridge, offering a panoramic view from a natural vantage point high above the Längibachtal valley. This vista encompasses the Aare Valley and the majestic Alps. While the official hiking route bypasses the highest summits, these peaks can be accessed via forest trails. The "Linnerberg Trail," designated for mountain biking, is marked along the ridge. The eastern slope of the Linnerberg is recognized as a challenging area for orienteering activities.

== Nature conservation ==
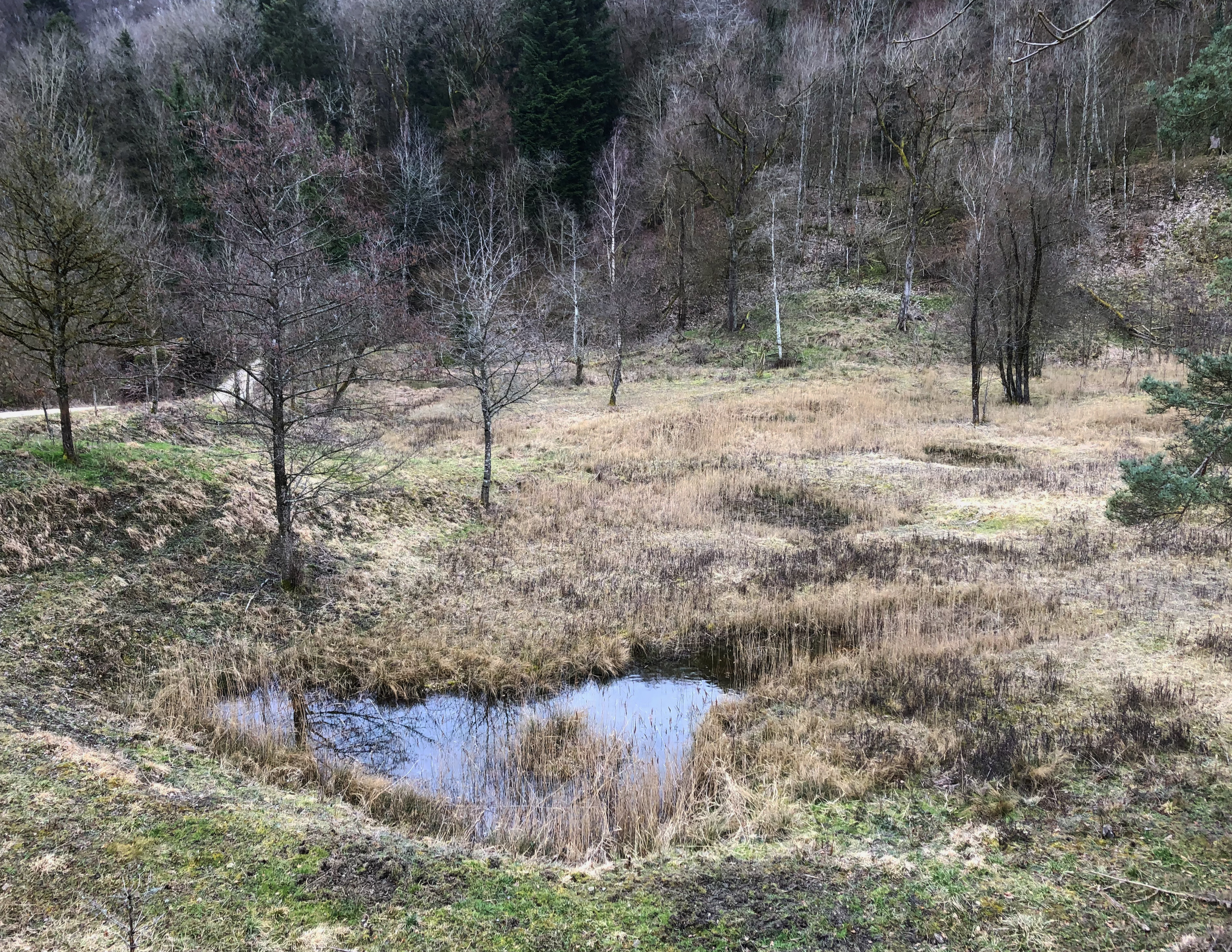
Eriwis nature reserve, an amphibian spawning area of national importance

There are several nature reserves in the area of the almost completely forested Linnerberg. Cantonal forest reserves are situated at the rocky prominence known as Ibergflue to the west of Zeihergutsch, the Gättibuech area near Linn, and the Broochtel near Wallnach. The open meadow slope "Chneublet" near Wallach is designated as part of the federal inventory of dry meadows and pastures of national significance. Additionally, the Längibachtal and Grund areas are encompassed by the "Aargauer und östlicher Solothurner Faltenjura" landscape protection region, duly recognized within the Federal Inventory of Landscapes and Natural Monuments of National Importance.

The mountainous terrain safeguards diverse reptile habitats, including the elusive asps viper, a species rarely found within the canton of Aargau. On the northern slope of the Grund mountain range, a wetland has been established within a section of the former "Eriwis" opalinuston pit near Schinznach train station. This area, once exploited by Zurich Brickworks (Zürcher Ziegeleien) until 1998, holds the distinction of being one of the nationally significant amphibian spawning grounds. Designated as a cantonal nature reserve in 2021, this 15-hectare site has been under the stewardship of BirdLife Aargau and the Eriwis Nature Workshop since 2015, with the latter managing the area since 2006. The reserve and its surroundings have many types of birds, various amphibians like grass frogs, midwife toads, and common toads, and around 25 types of dragonflies. A comprehensive study by ETH Zurich has documented around 100 wild bee species within the reserve and its immediate vicinity. Furthermore, diverse orchid species thrive within the dry meadow segments of Eriwis.

The mountainous, wooded natural landscape serves as a pivotal launch point for nationally significant wildlife corridors along the Aare River. The parameters of connectivity zones vital for sustaining wildlife populations are delineated within the Canton Aargau Structure Plan.
