= Aargau Jura Park =

Coordinates: 47°32′05″N 8°07′30″E

- Jurapark Aargau
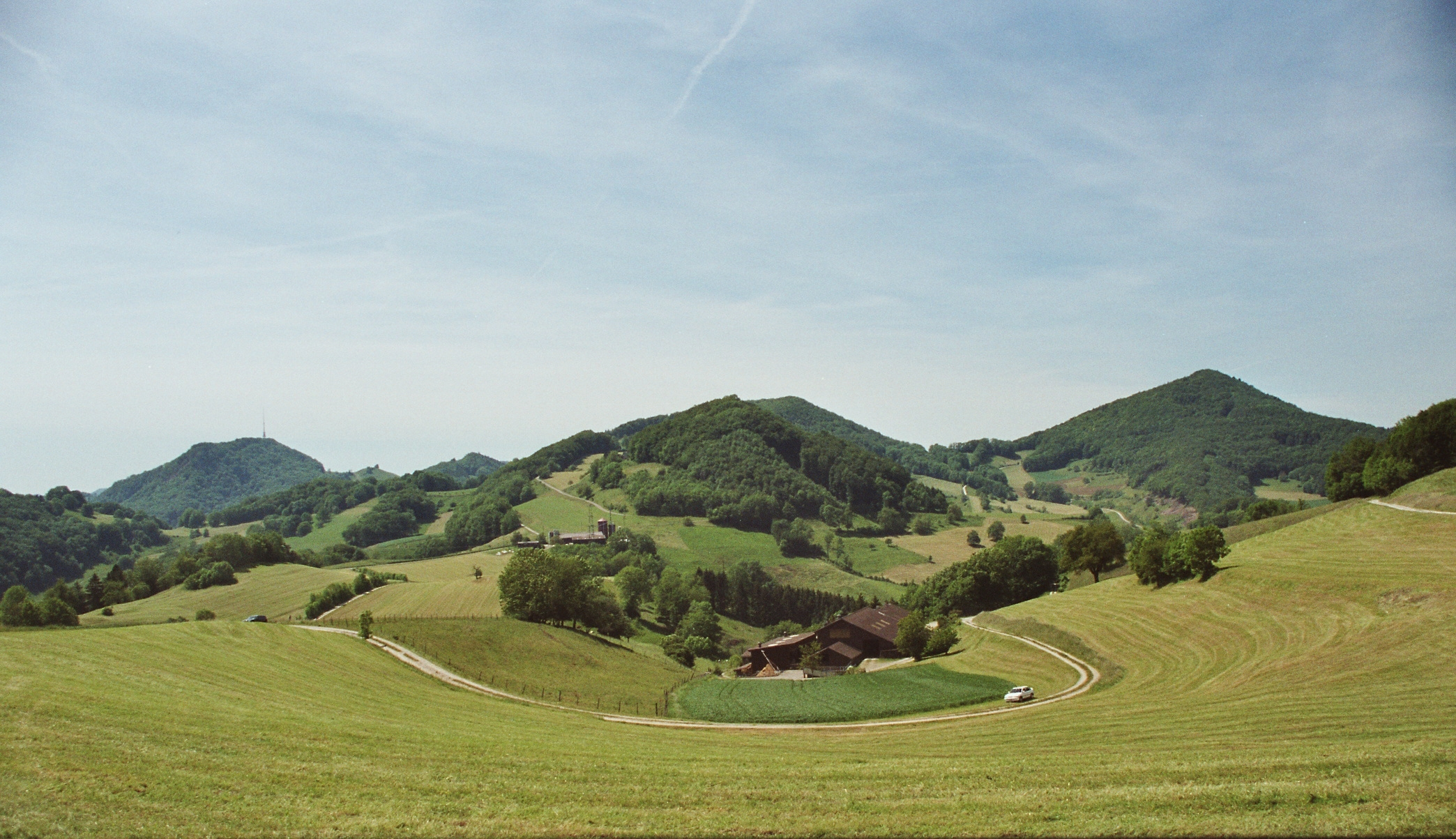
- Landscape of Jurapark Aargau
- Interactive map of Aargau Jura Park
- Location: Linn 51; CH-5225 Bözberg
- Website: www.jurapark-aargau.ch

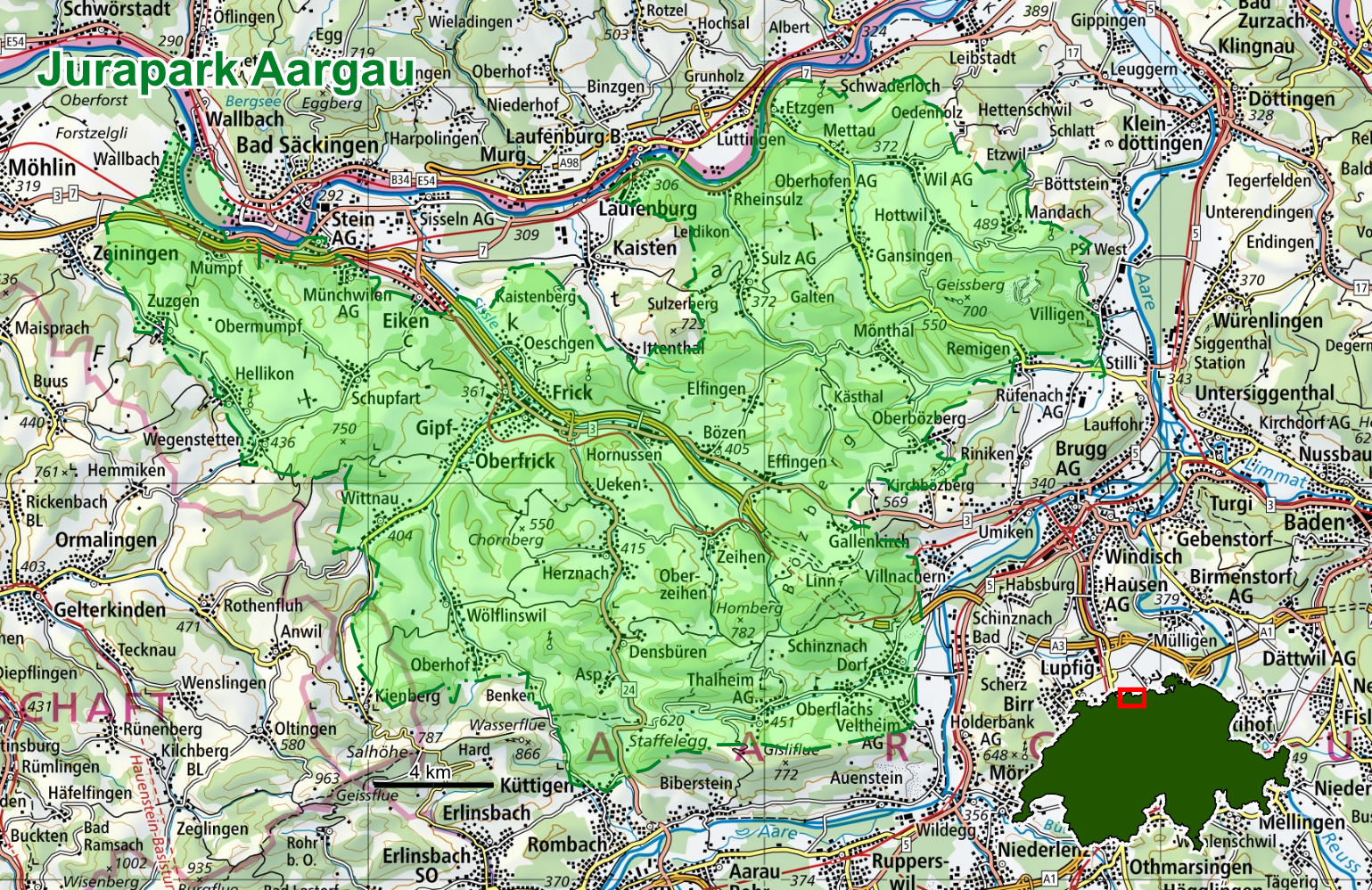
Map of Jurapark Aargau

Aargau Jura Park (Jurapark Aargau) is located north of Aarau, between the rivers Aare and Rhine, in the Swiss canton of Aargau. It straddles the border between Jura and Basel. It spans 241 square kilometres (93 sq mi) and reaches up to 350 metres (1,150 ft) above the valley floor. The park is mainly located on the Jurassic Plateau, between Frick and Villigen, and also encompasses the Aargau Jura mountains and valleys. The northern area includes sparse pine forests, fruit orchards, rocky steppes, dry meadows and terraced vineyards, while the southern region fosters forests and wildlife. It was declared a regional nature park of national importance in 2012 by the Federal Office for the Environment.

The villages Herznach and Wölfinswil traditionally mined ore in the park and thus, left many studs. A mining tunnel was excavated and made accessible to visitors.

== See also ==
- Nature parks in Switzerland
- Linnerberg (Aargau)
