= Kraków-Częstochowa Upland =

Upland mountains of Poland

Coordinates: 50°12′24″N 19°49′45″E

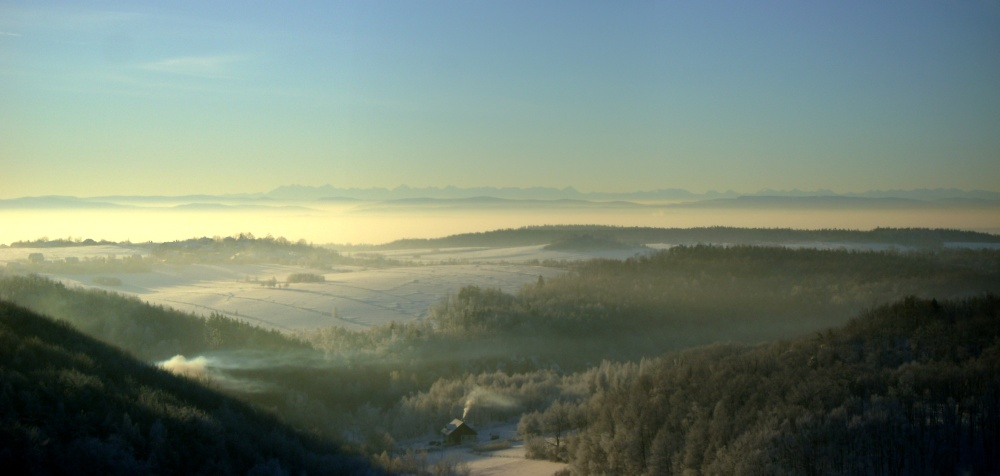
View of the Tatra Mountains from the castle ruin Grodzisko at Skała

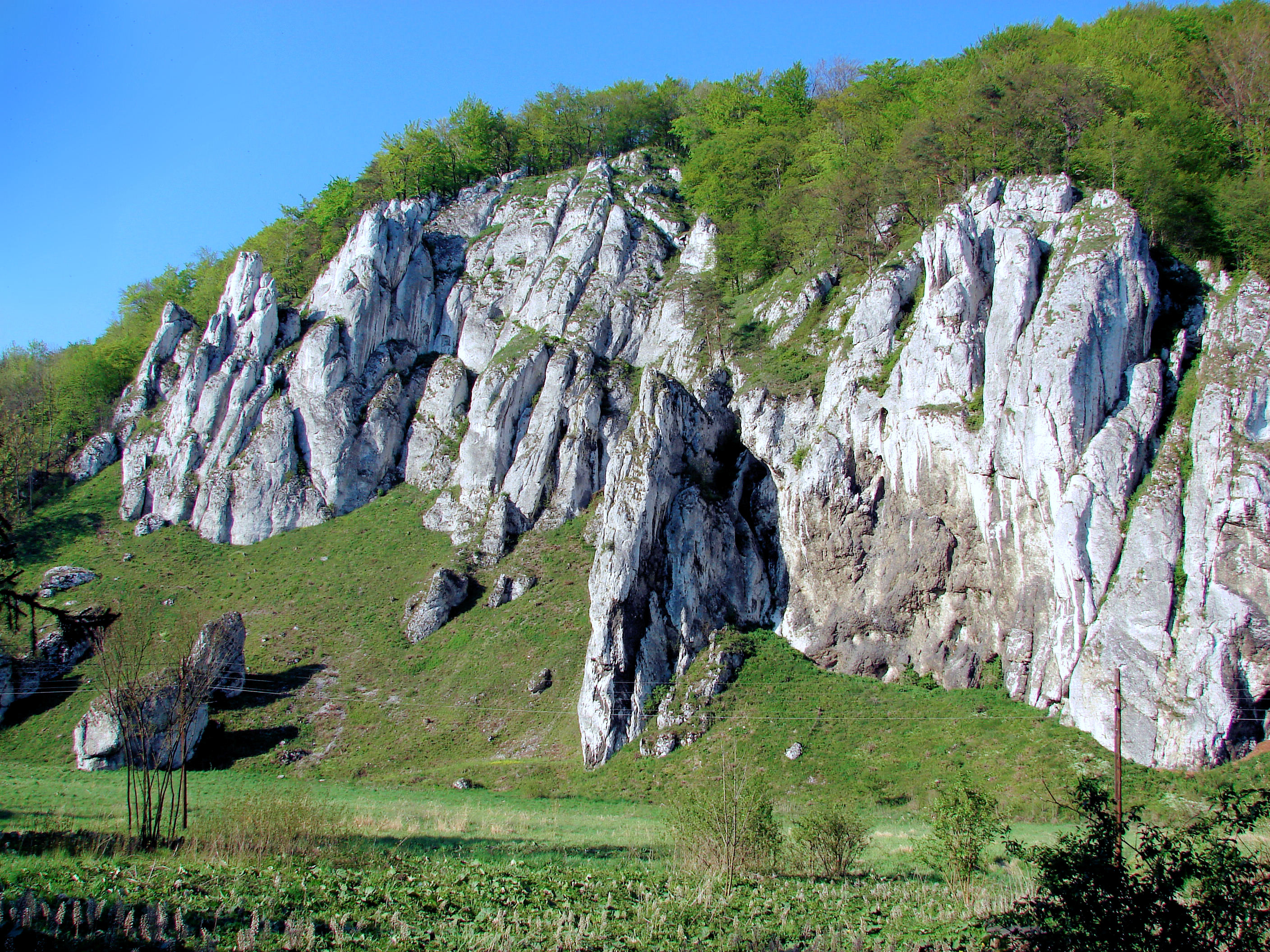
Polish Jura, Glove Rock (Skała Rękawica) at Ojców National Park

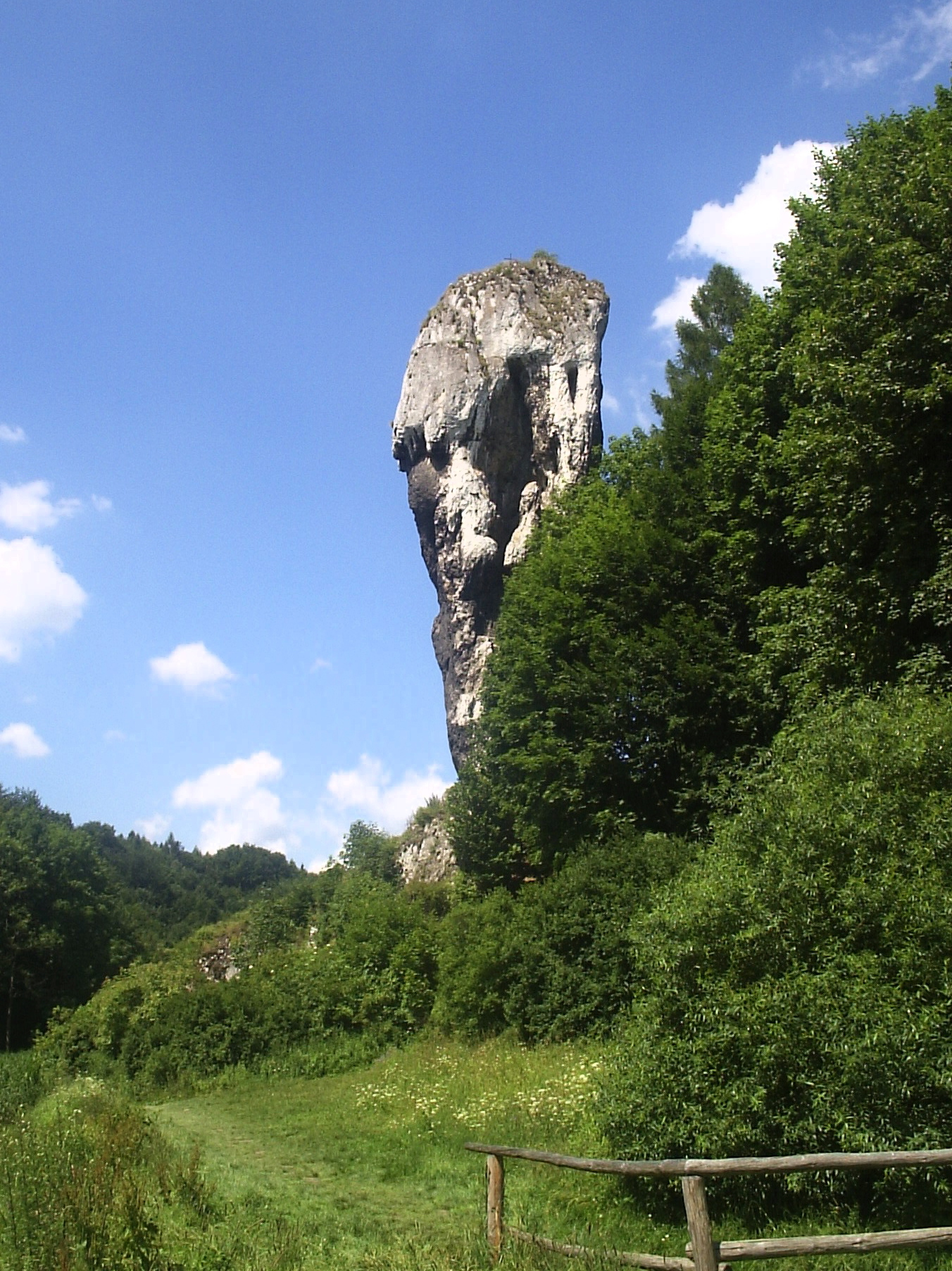
Maczuga Herkulesa

The Kraków-Częstochowa Upland, also known as the Polish Jurassic Highland or Polish Jura (Polish: Jura Krakowsko-Częstochowska), is part of the Jurassic System of south–central Poland, stretching between the cities of Kraków, Częstochowa and Wieluń. The Polish Jura borders the Lesser Polish Upland to the north and east, the foothills of the Western Carpathians to the south and Silesian Upland to the west.

The Polish Jura consists of a hilly landscape with Jurassic limestone rocks, cliffs, valleys and vast limestone formations, featuring some 220 caves. The relief of the upland developed since the Paleogene, under climatic conditions changing considerably. Its main component is a peneplain, crowned by monadnocks, rocky masses that resisted erosion, generated as hard rock on Late Jurassic buildup surrounded by less resistant bedded limestone of the same age. The Polish Jura is visited by roughly 400,000 visitors a year. Part of it belongs to the Ojców National Park, the smallest of Poland's twenty national parks, ranking among the most attractive recreational areas of the country.

== Flora and fauna ==
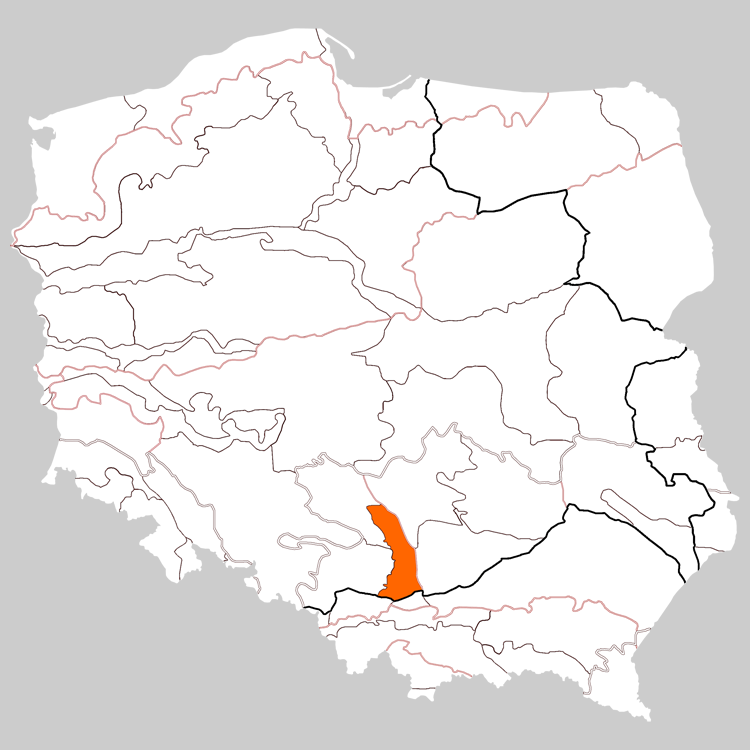
Location of the Polish Jura

The Kraków-Częstochowa Jurassic Upland consists of a rich ecosystem, partly because of the unique microclimate and also because of the whole upland being surrounded by a natural forest. Plant and animal life is very diverse with over 1600 species of plants and 5500 species of animals. These include 4600 species of insects, including 1700 of beetles and 1075 of butterflies and 135 of birds. Mammals include the beaver, badger, ermine and 15 species of bats, many of which hibernate in the park's caves during the winter.

The climate of the upland differs significantly from the surrounding area. The snowpack covers the area for 80 days a year and the rainy season lasts from April until September. Annual precipitation varies between 650–700 mm, higher than in surrounding regions, the median temperature is lower, from 0.5 to 1.0°C. Average temperature is 19°C in summer and -3°C in winter.

There are a number of rivers that originate from the Kraków-Częstochowa Upland, among them the Warta, Biała Przemsza, Pilica, Dłubnia, Szreniawa, Prądnik, Wiercica and Rudawa.

Apart from a diversity of plant and animal species, one can find a unique cultural landscape with archeological objects and relics of ancient inhabitation, with a vast collection of artifacts. The earliest settlement in the area dates to the Paleolithic period, approximately 12,000 years ago. The region is rich in flint, which attracted early humans.

== Gallery ==
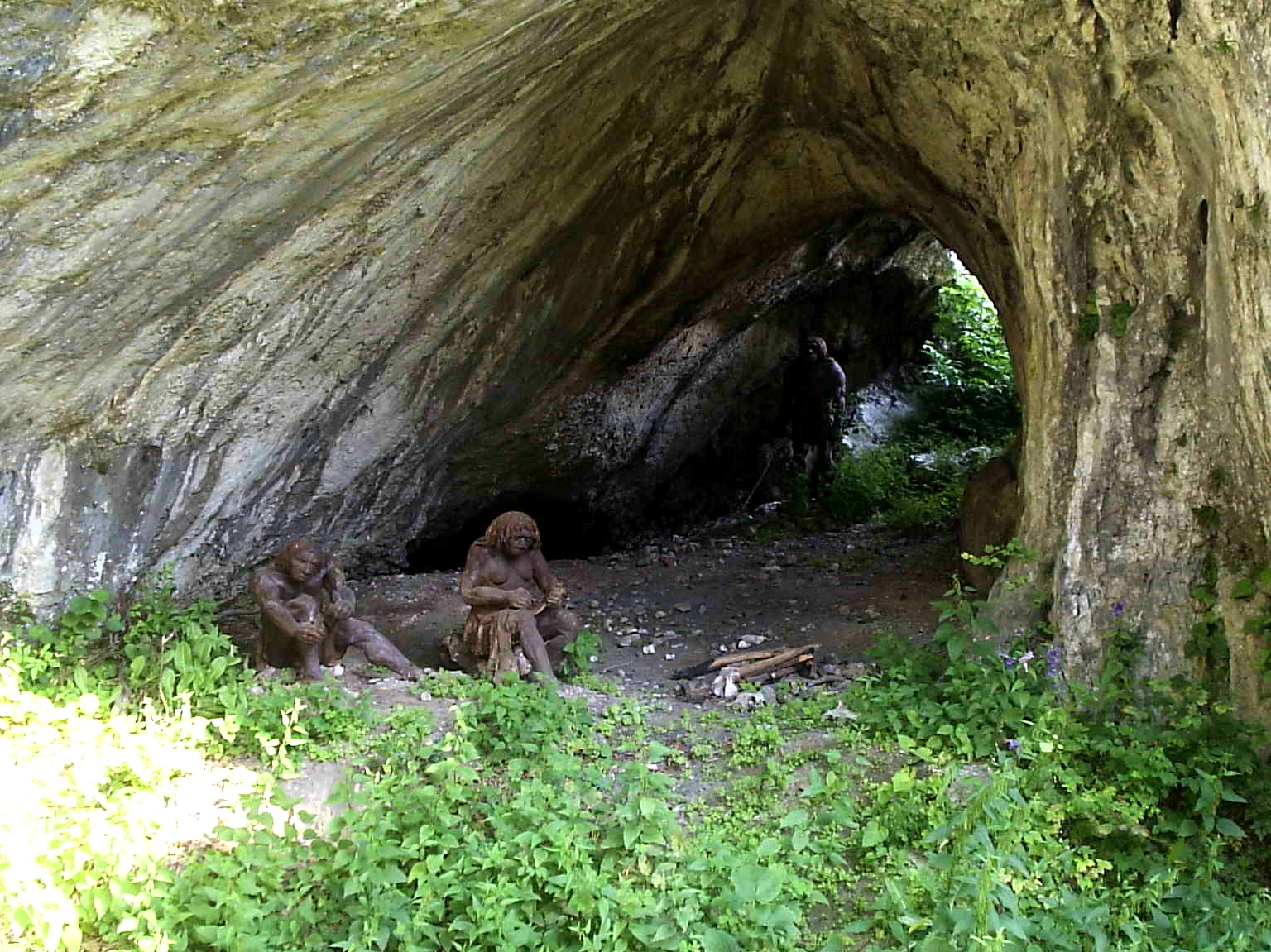
Statues of Neanderthal in the Dark Cave

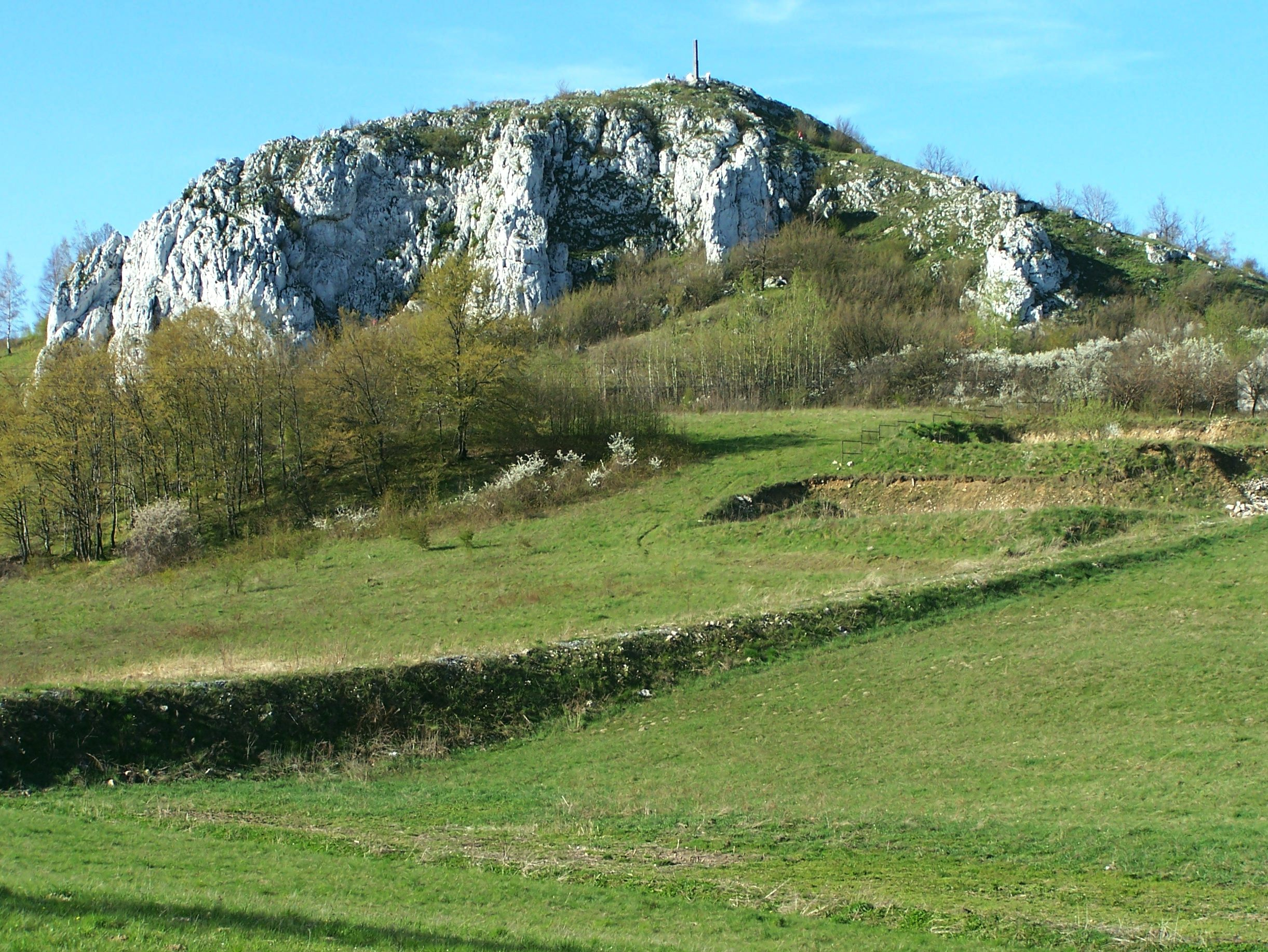
Highland Outlier

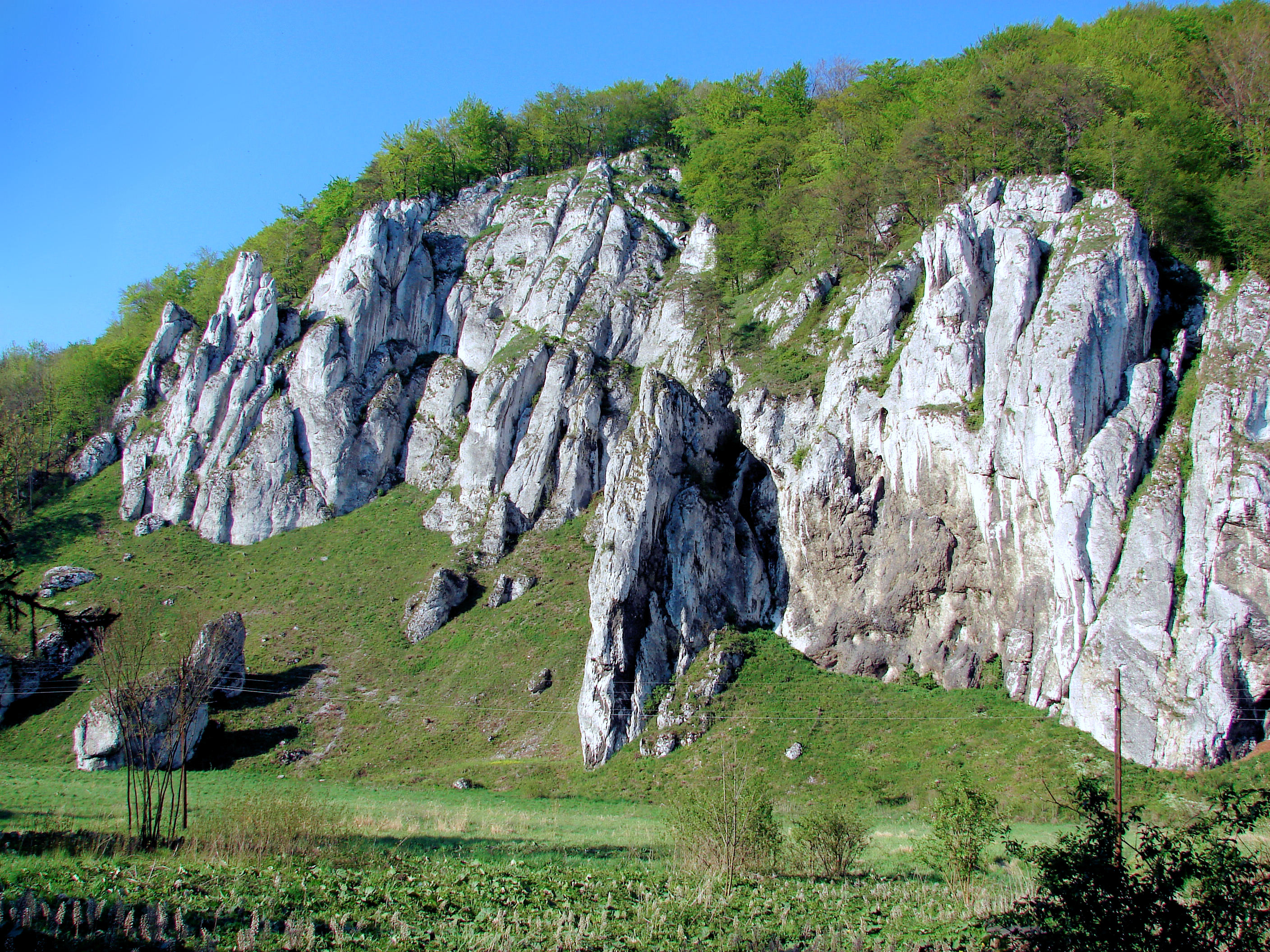
Crown Rocks

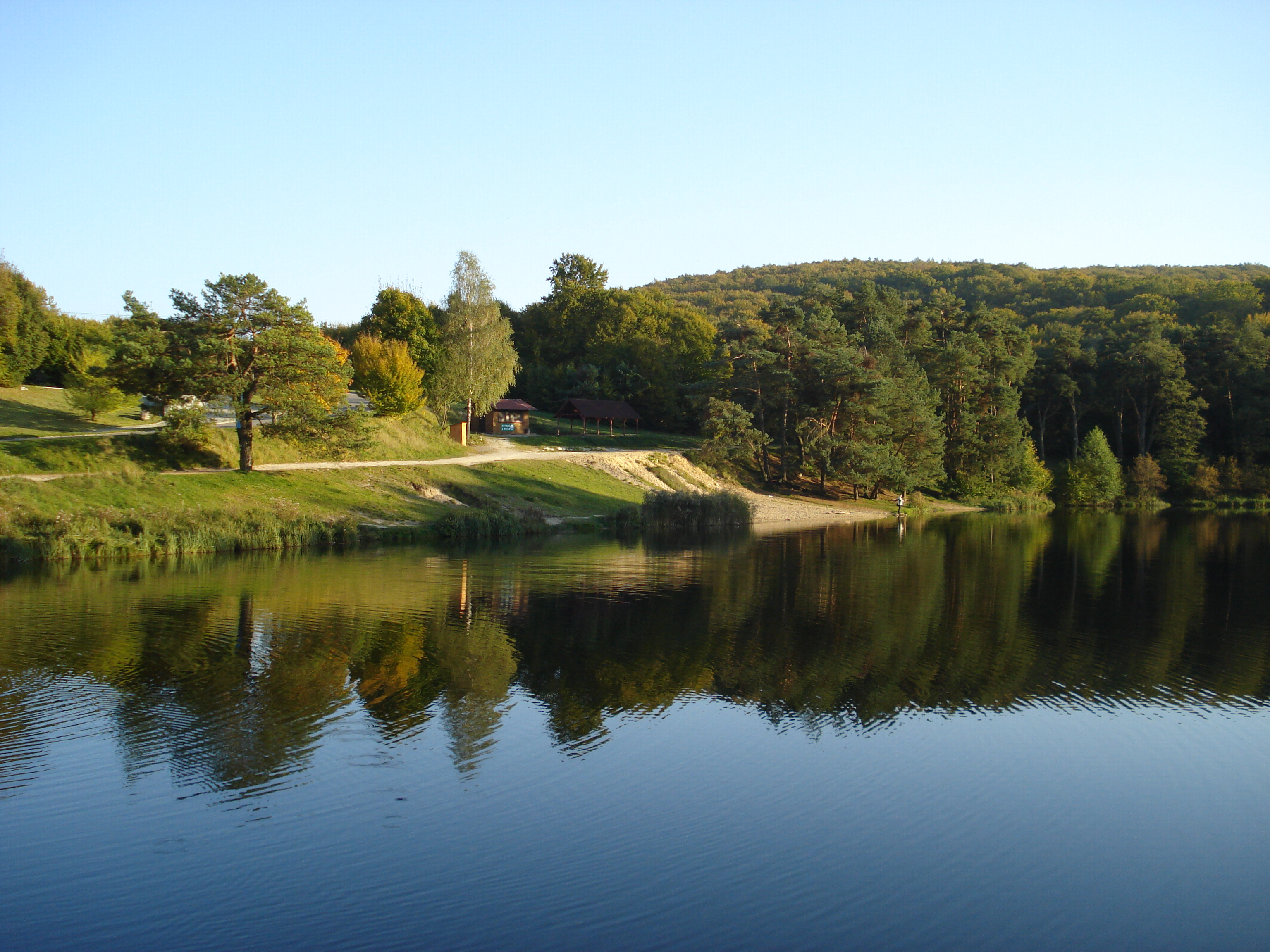
Pond 'American' in Złoty Potok

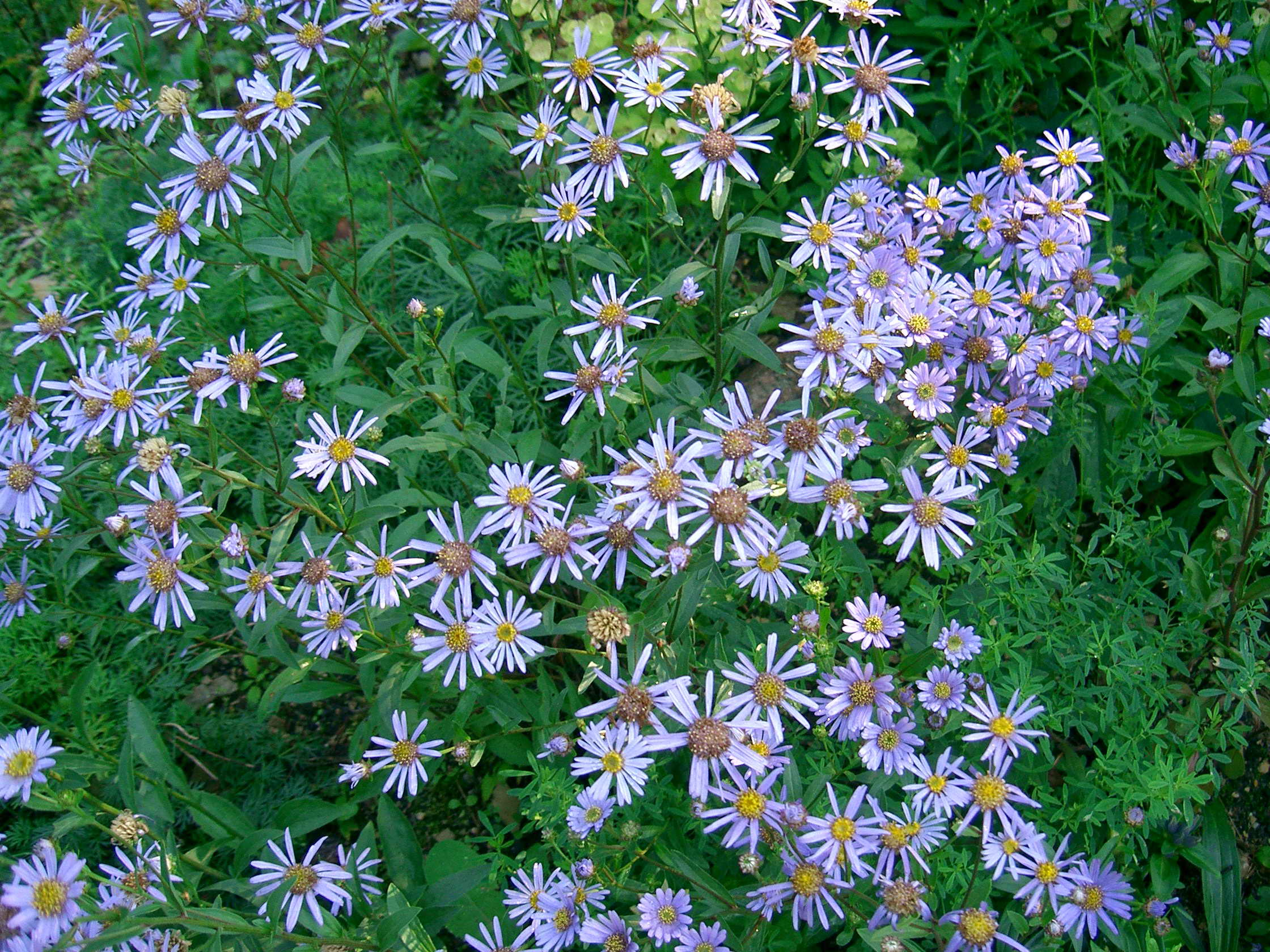
Aster amellus

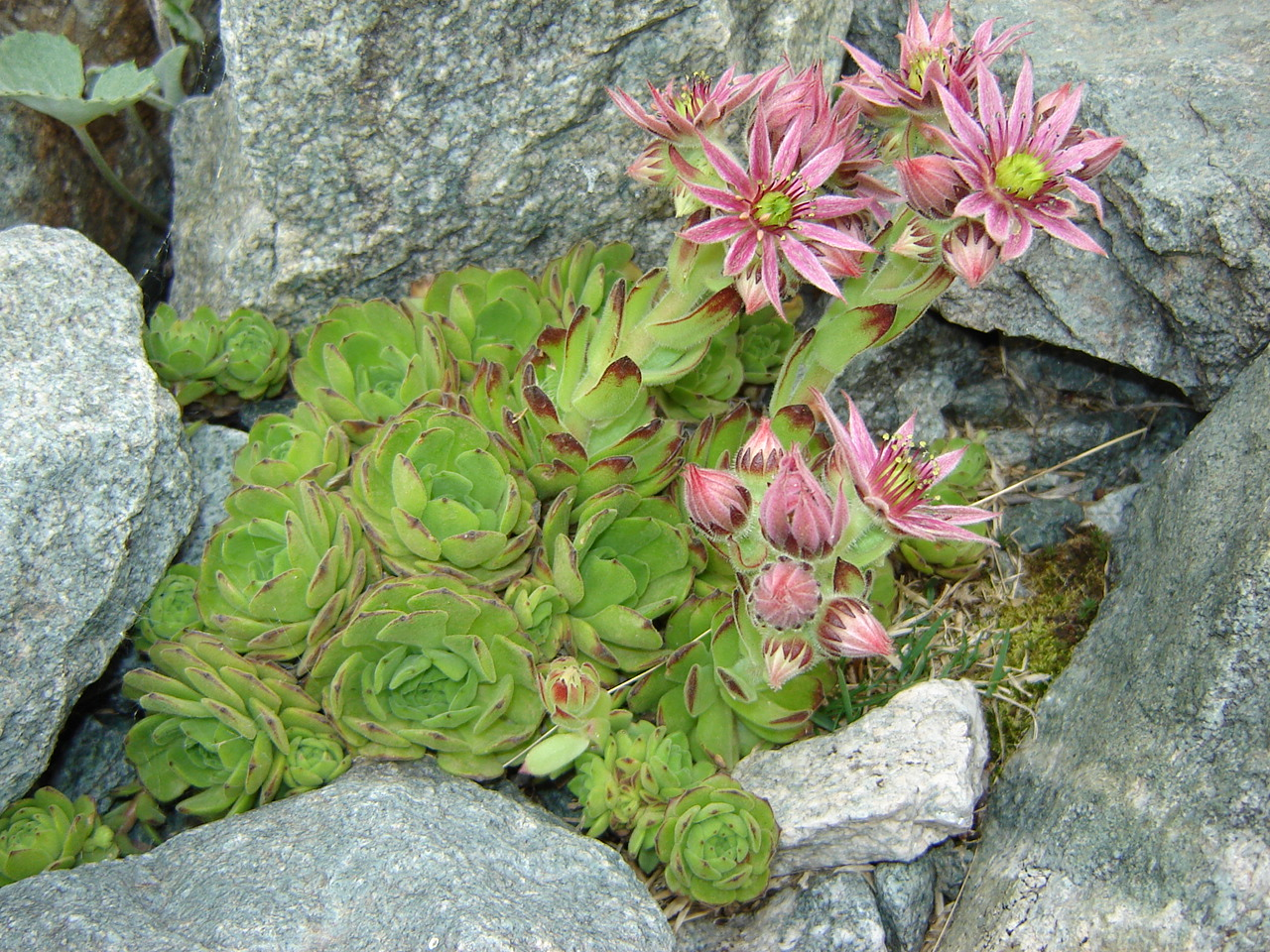
Mountain swarm (Sempervivum montanum L.)

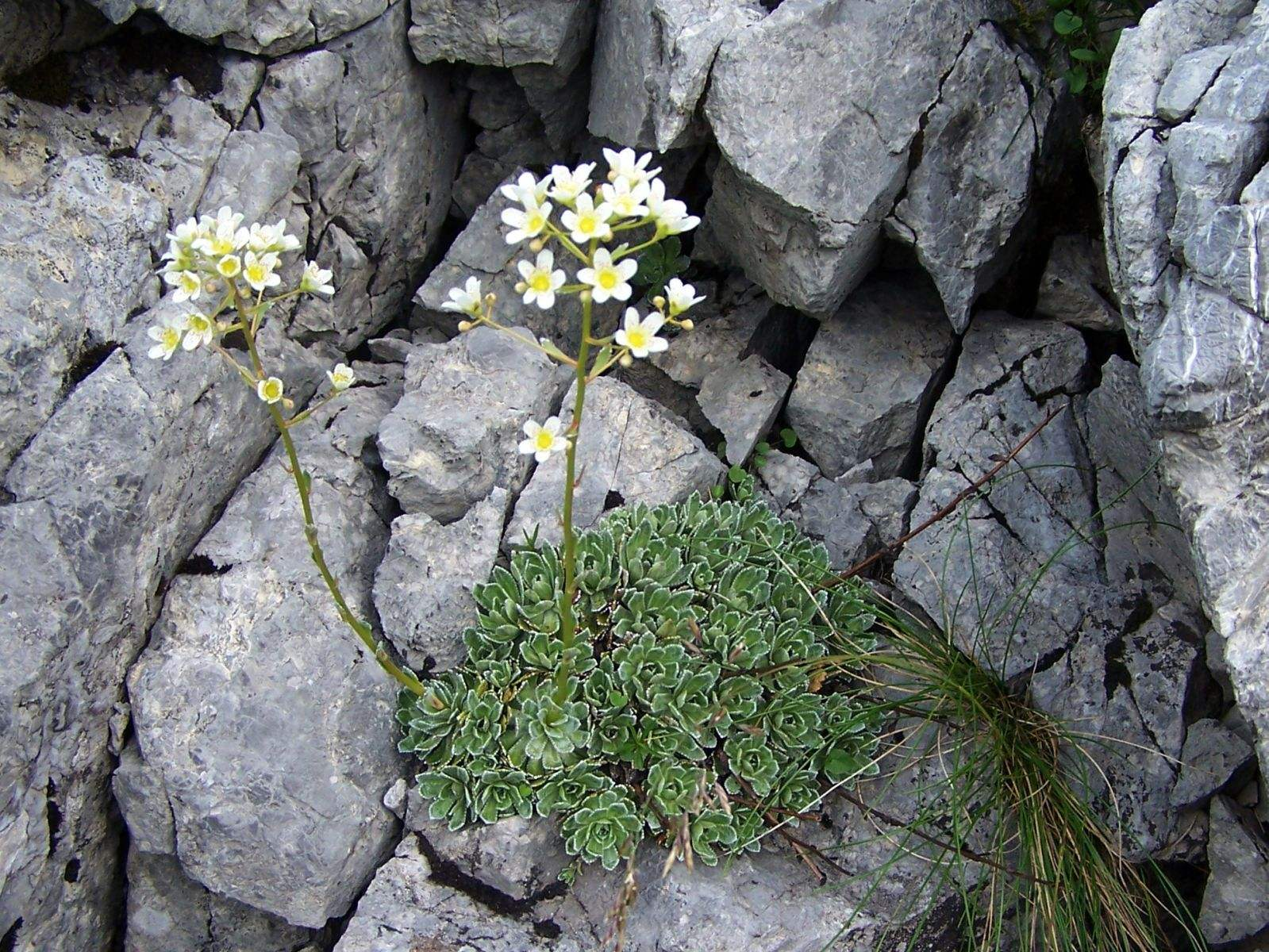
Saxifraga paniculata

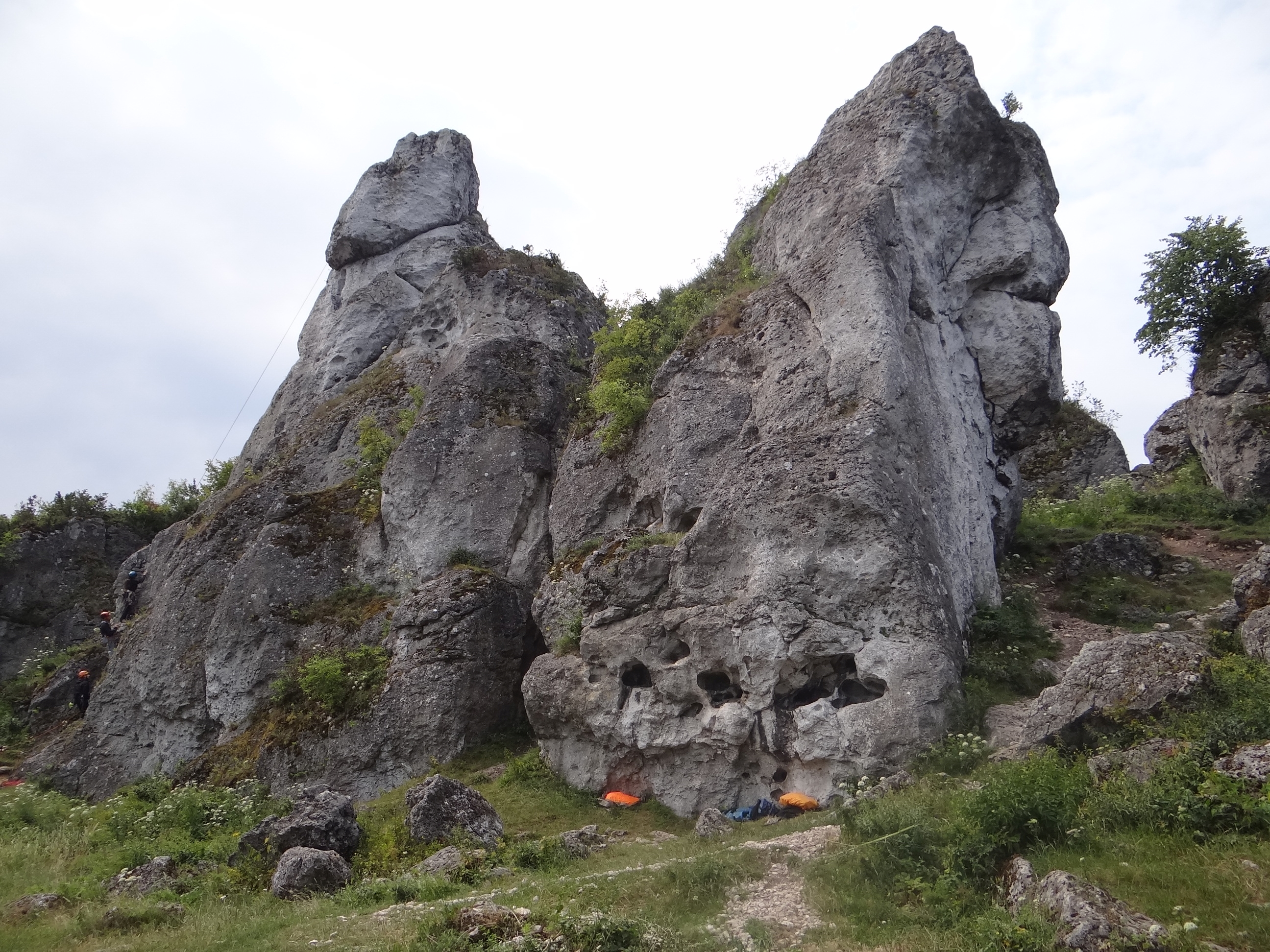
Camel Rock on Zborów Mountain

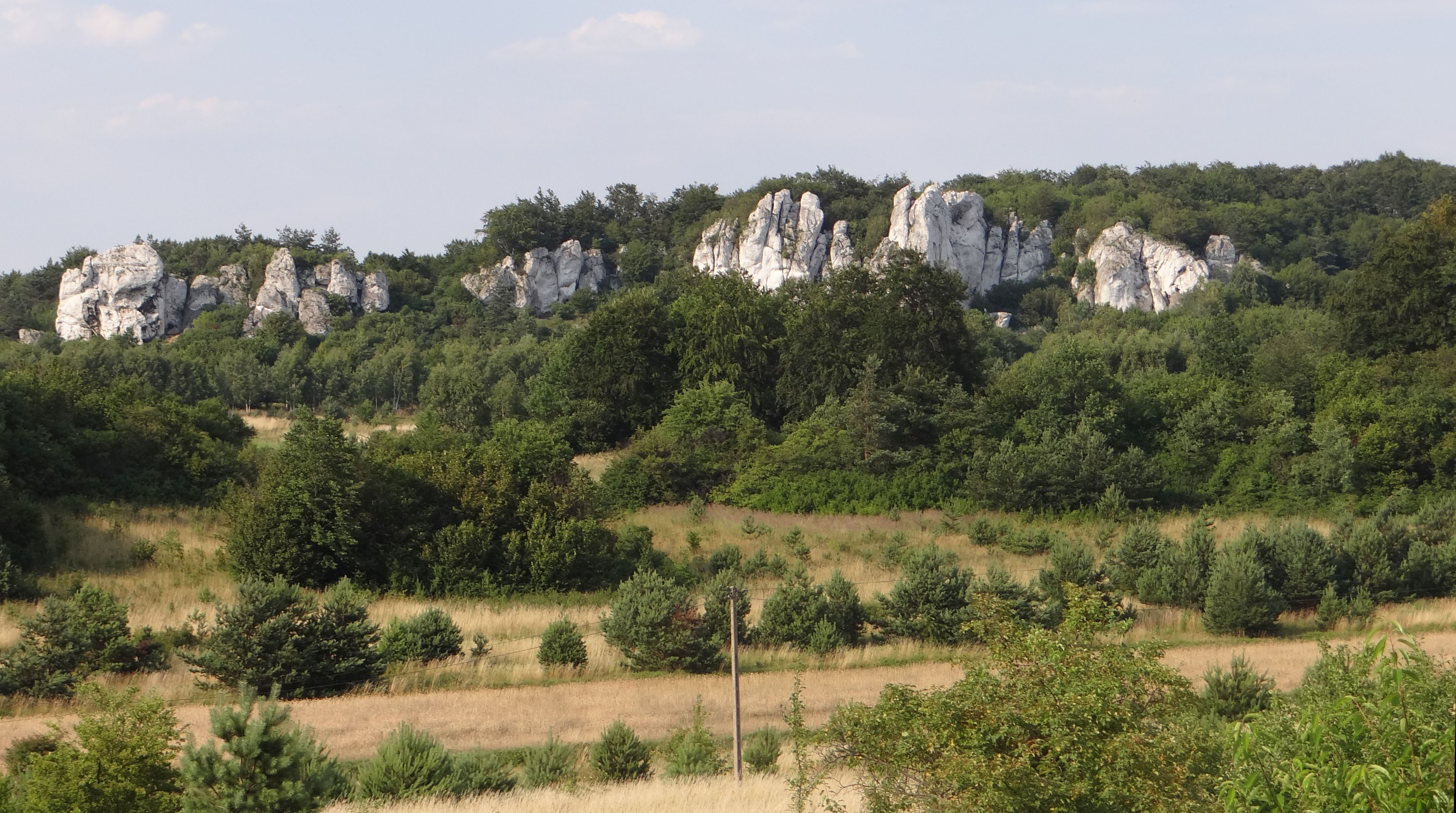
Rzędkowickie rocks

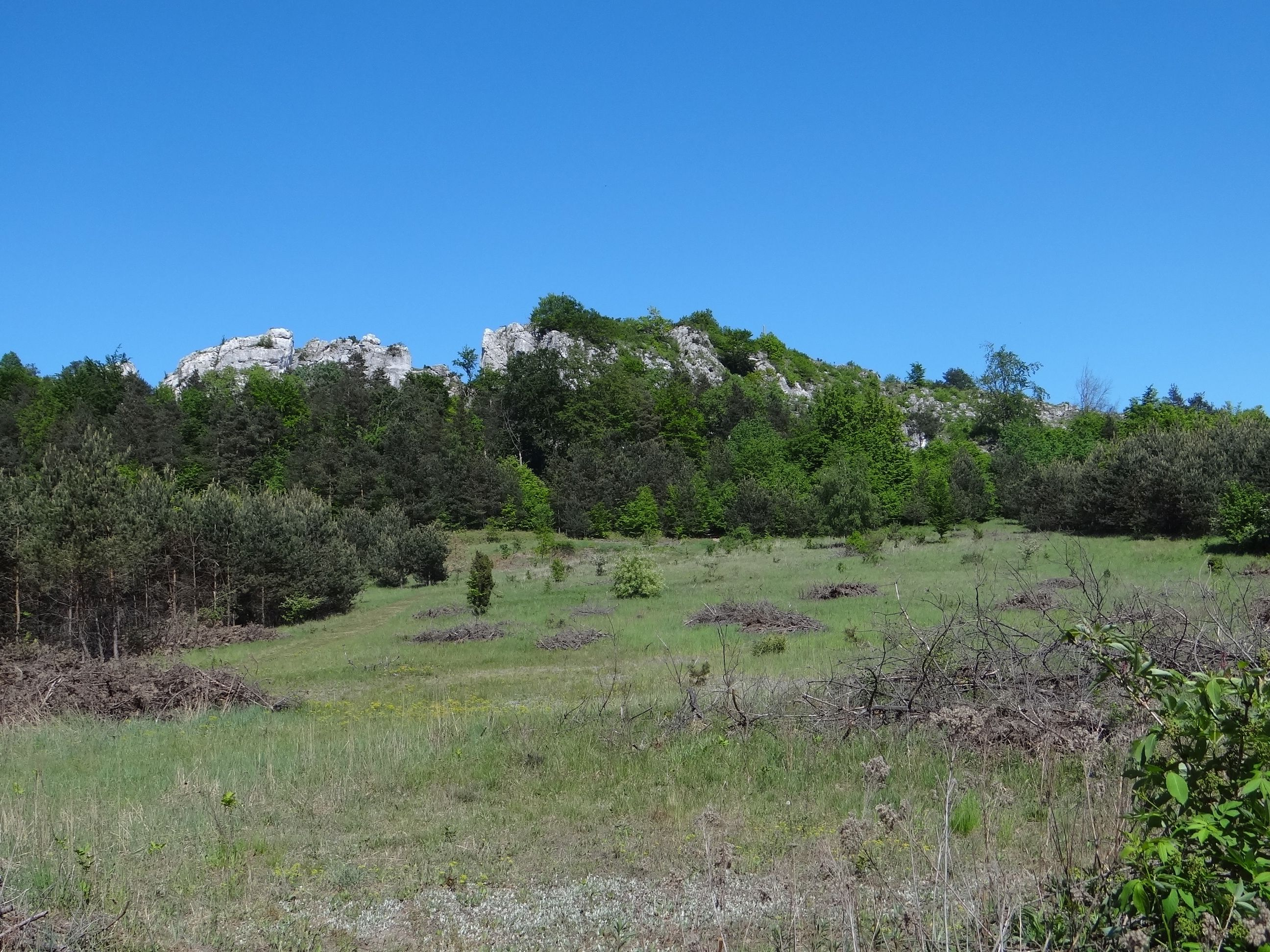
Zborów mountain nature reserve

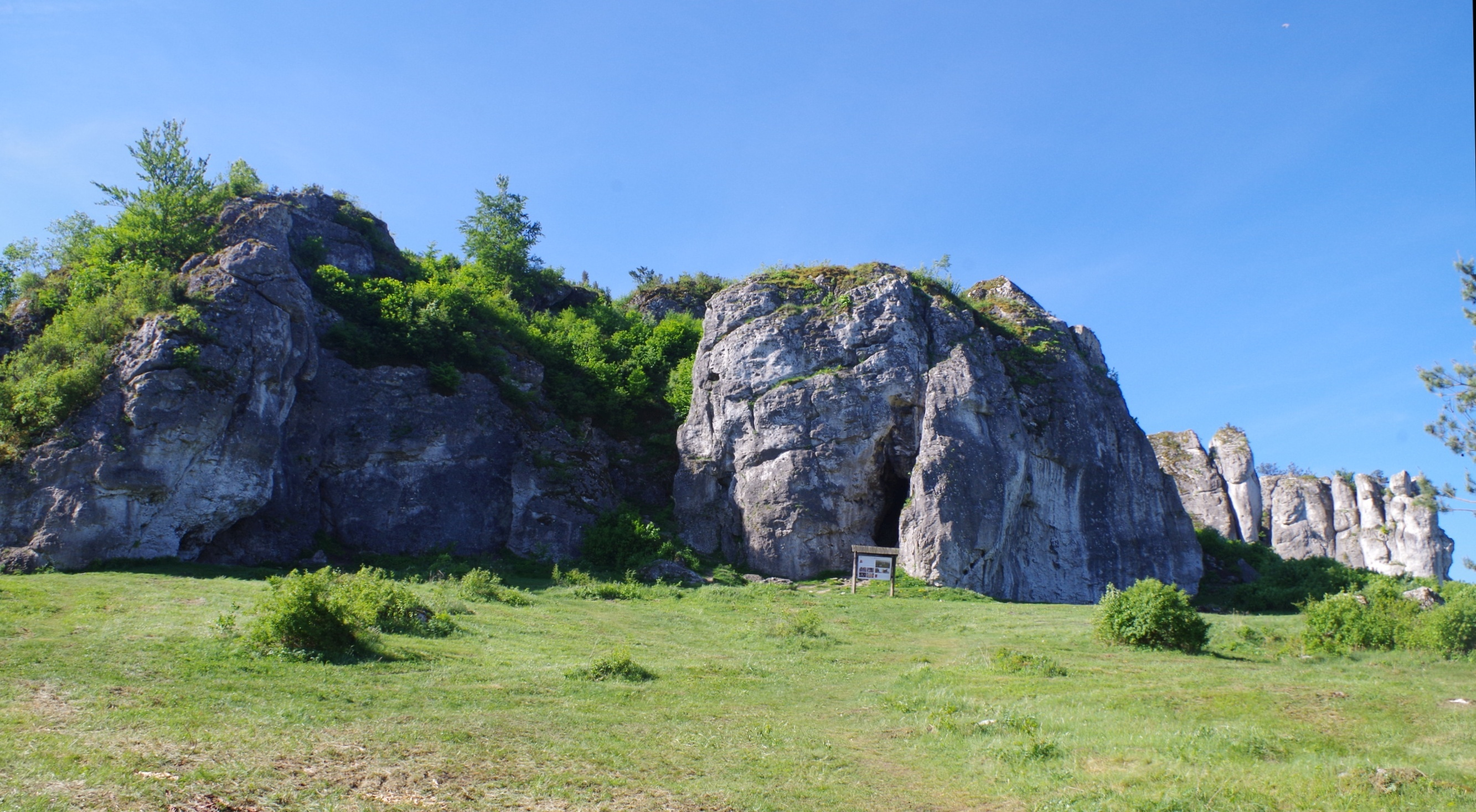
Mirowskie rocks

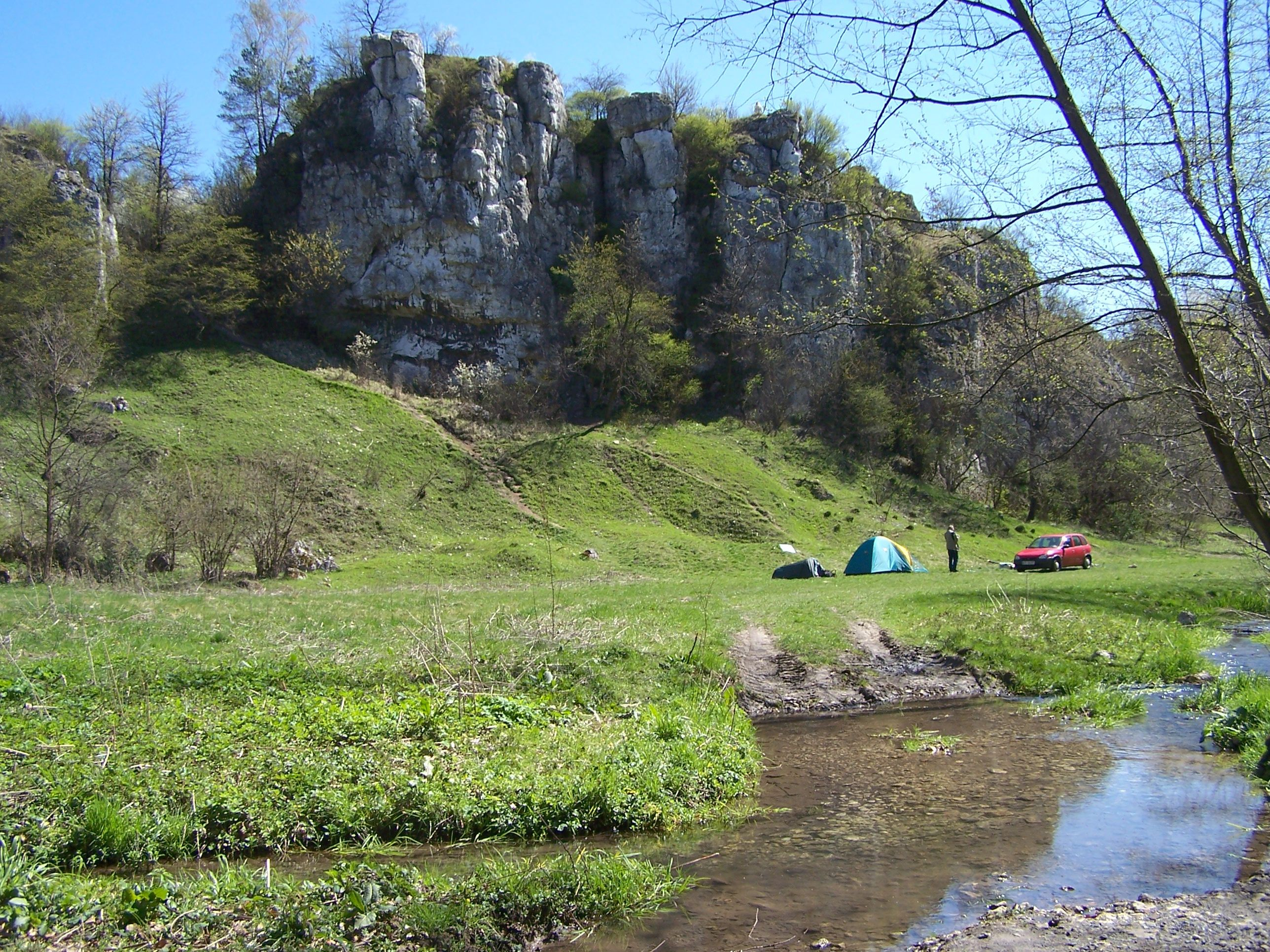
Kluczwody Valley

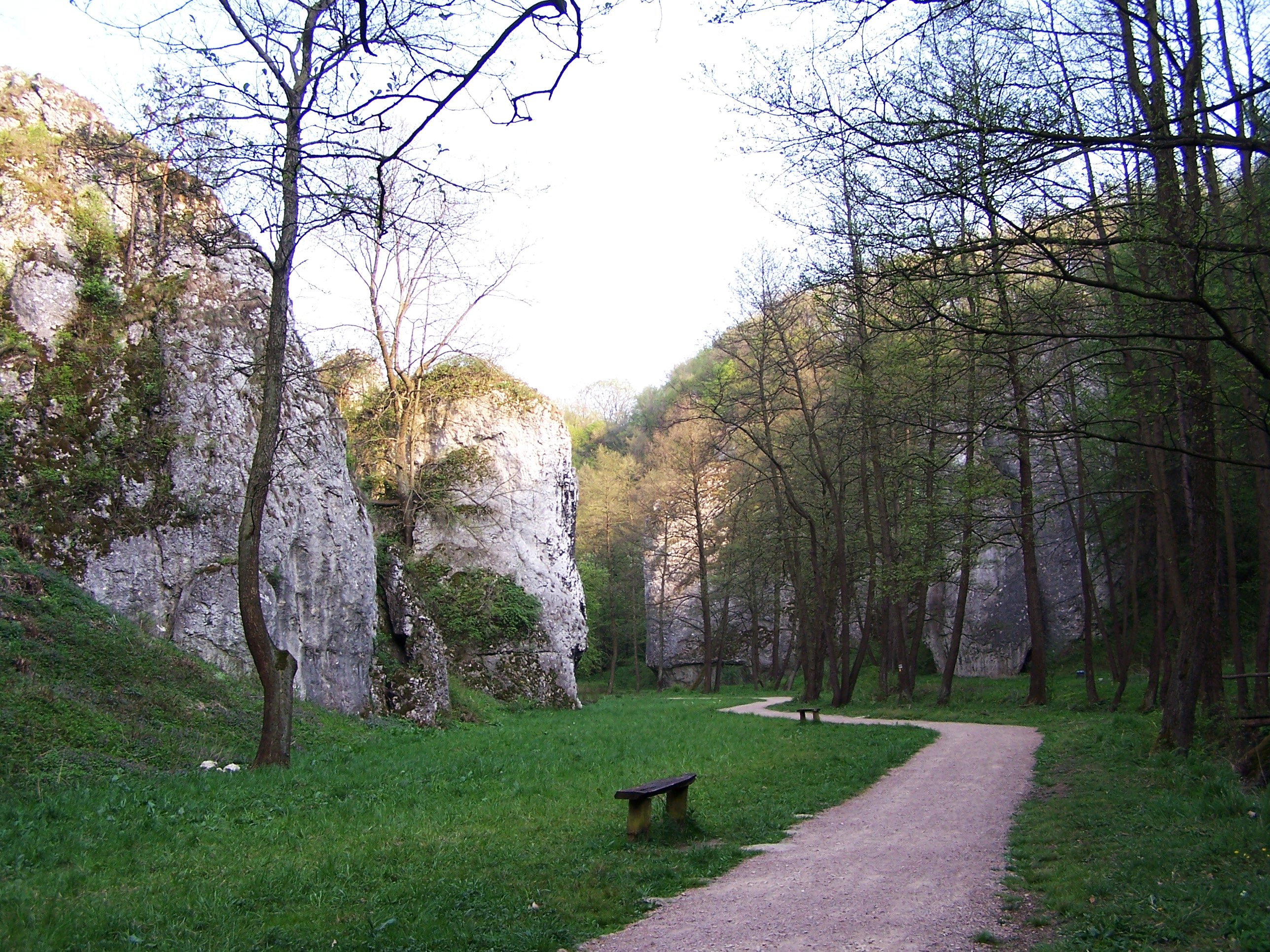
Mnikowska Valley

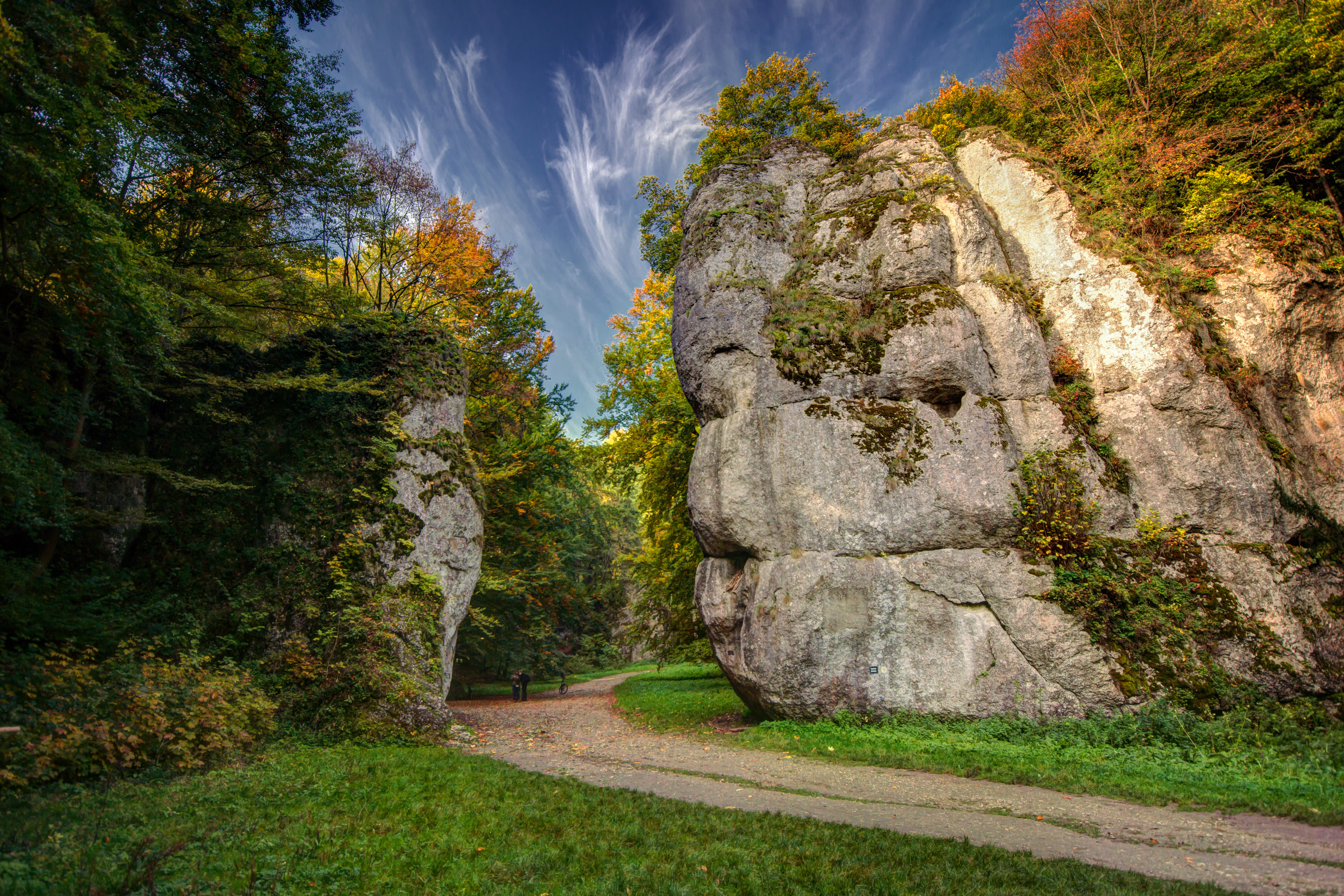
Kraków Gate

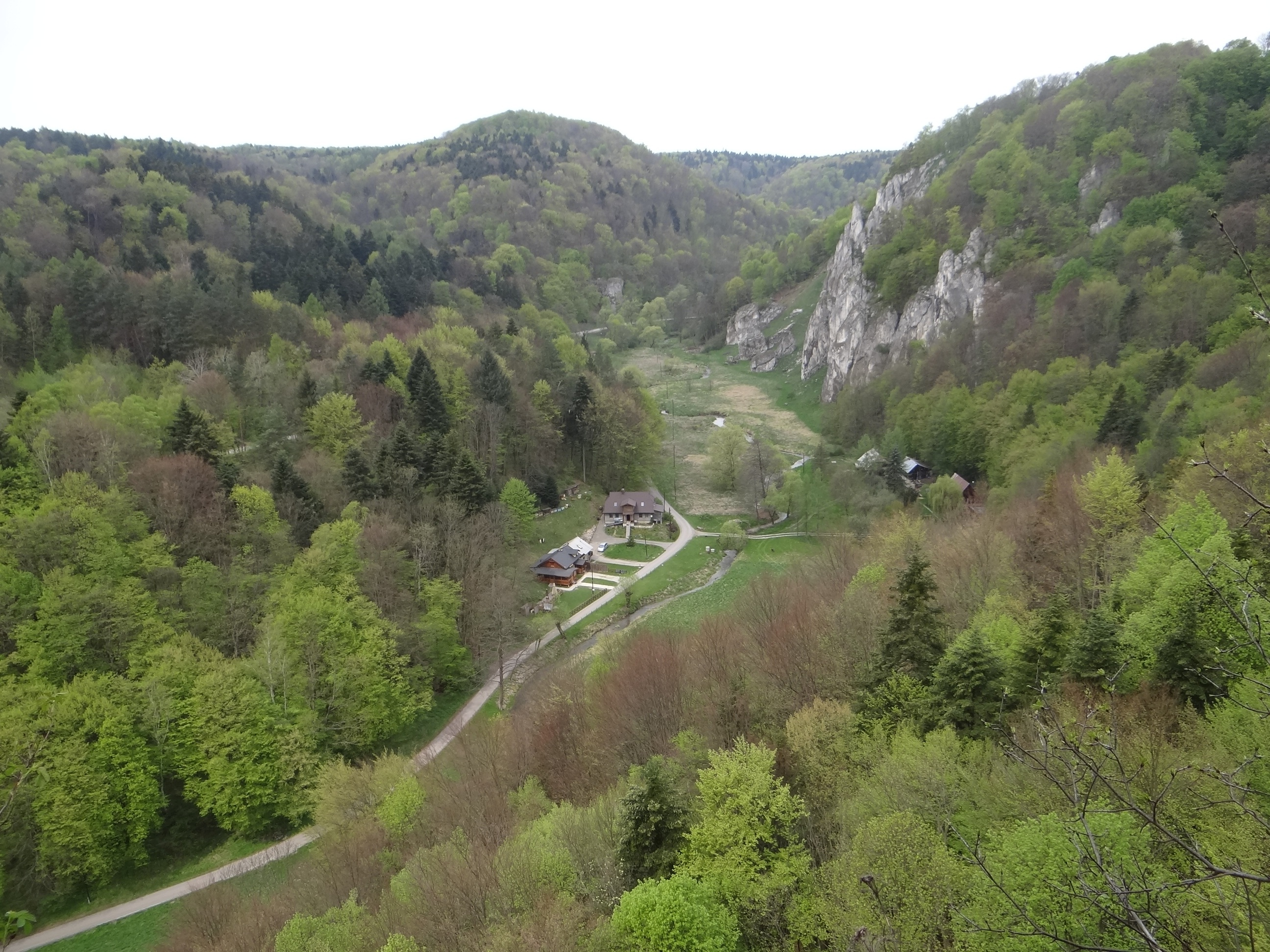
Canyon of Prądnik

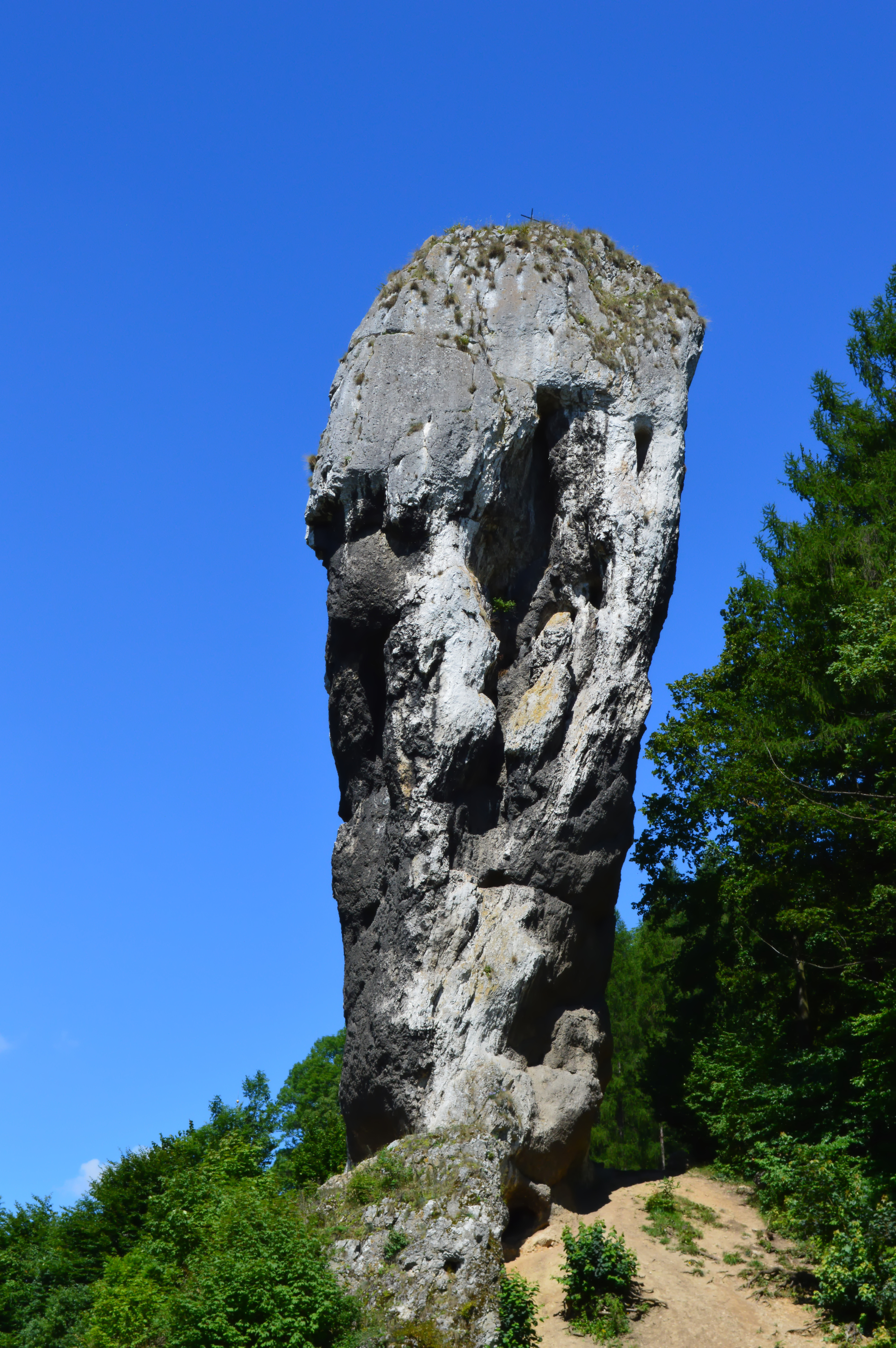
Club of Hercules

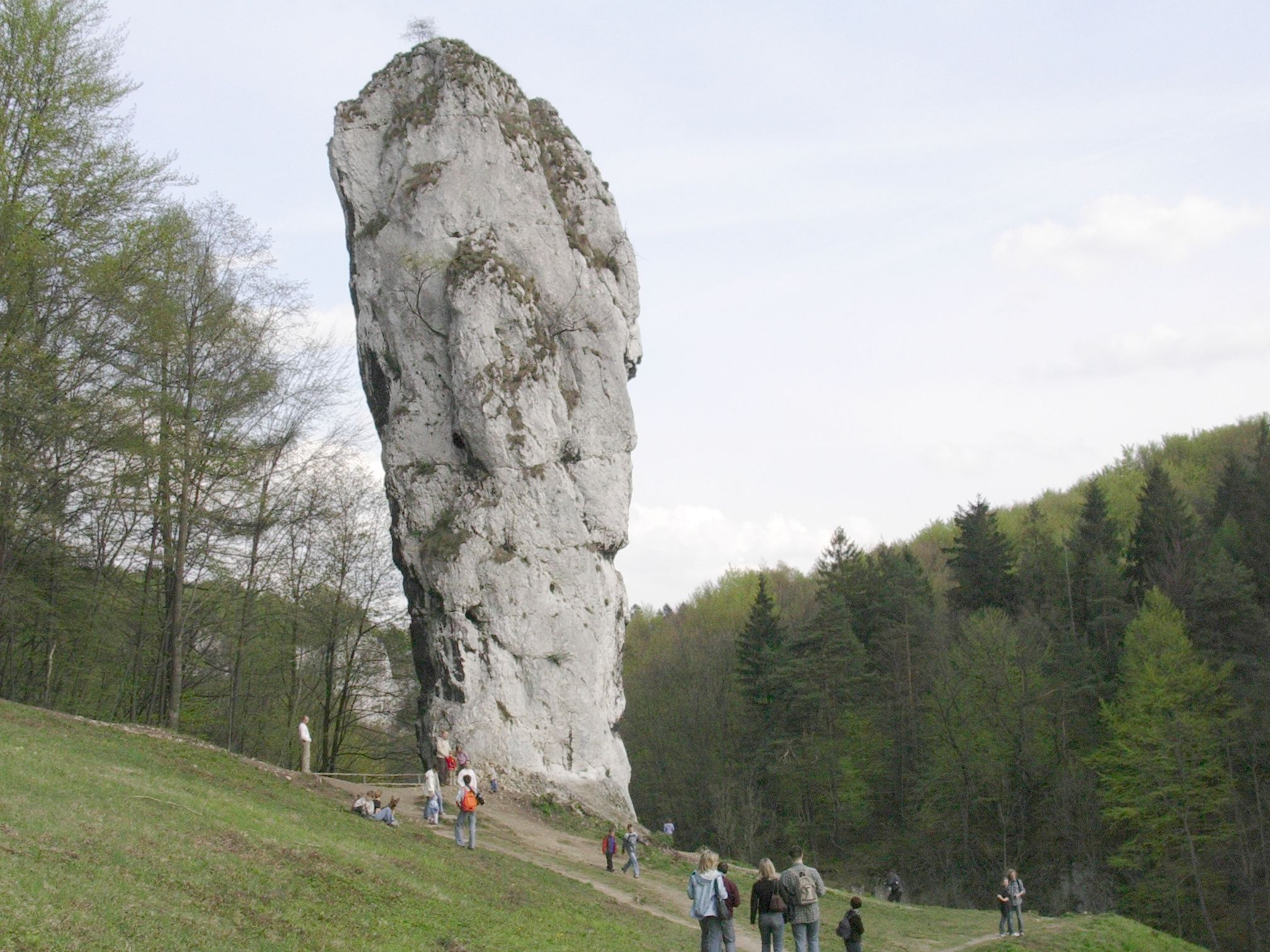
Club of Hercules

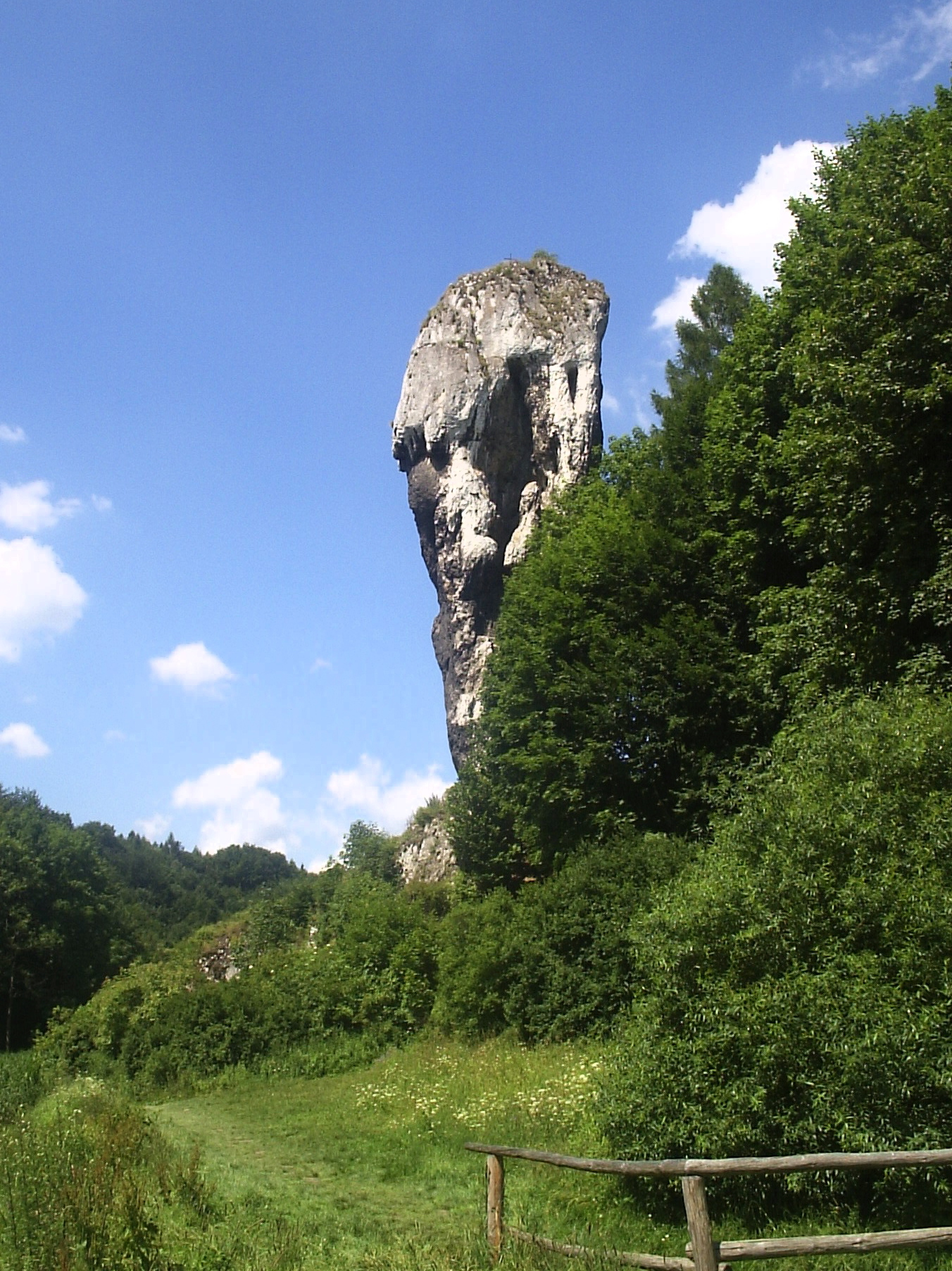
Club of Hercules

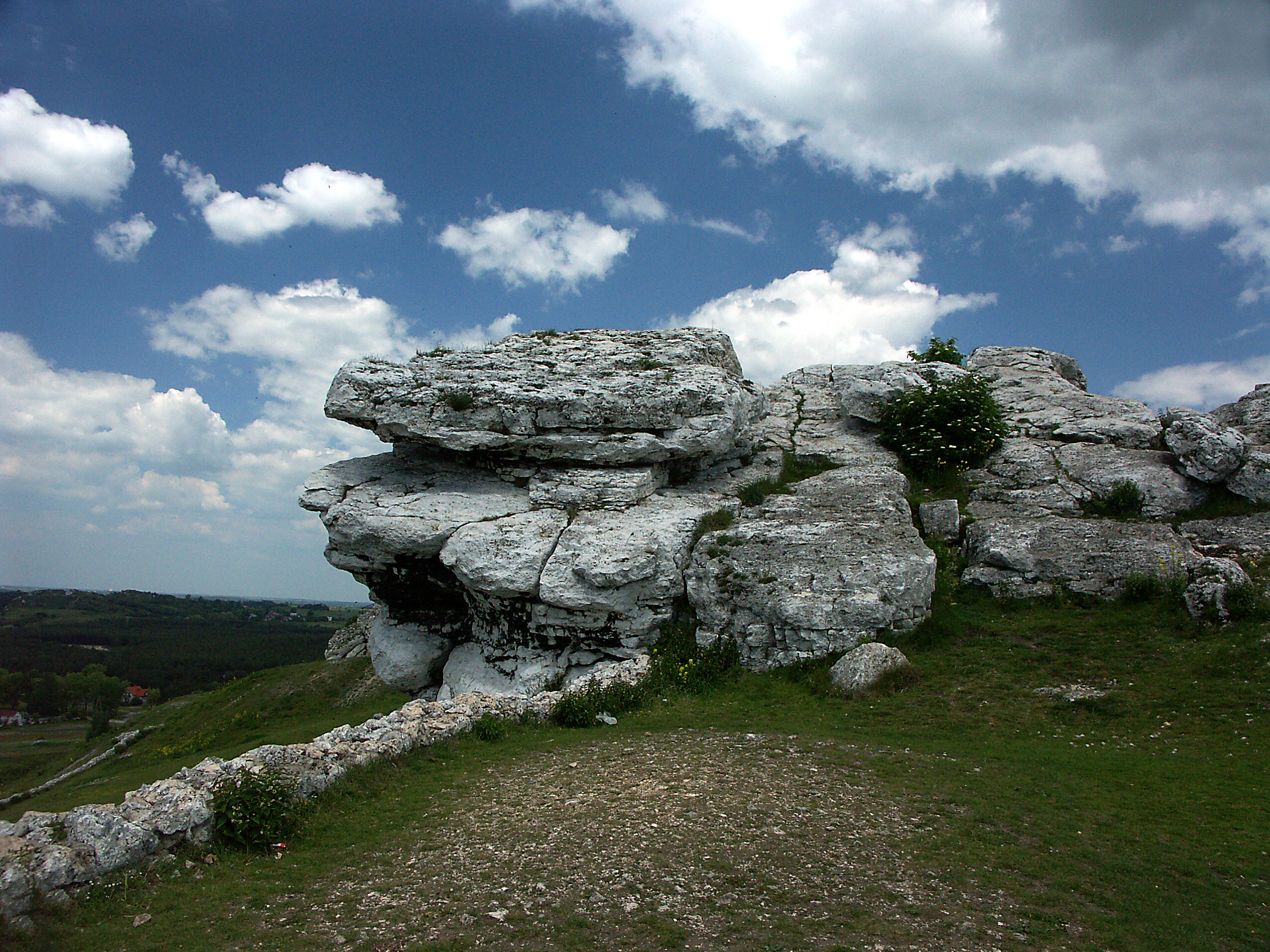
Typical landscape

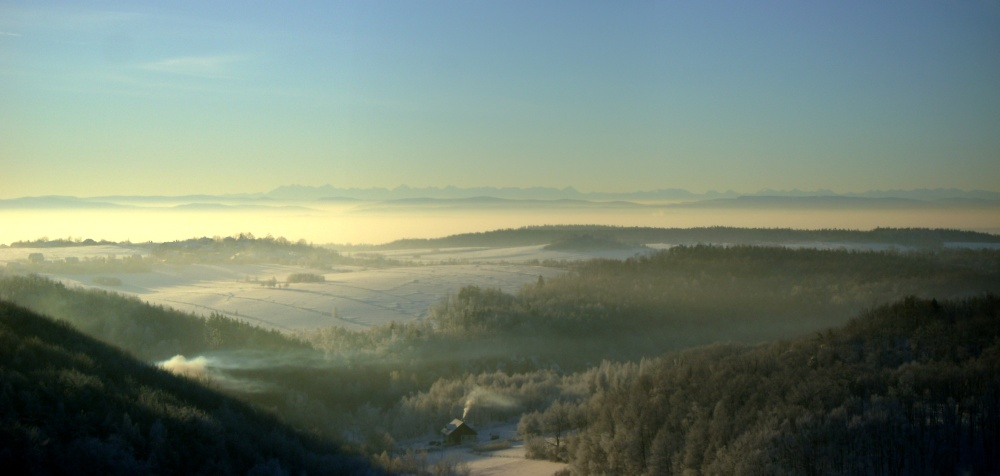
View of the Tatra Mountains, 115 km away from the ruins of Grodzisko castle near Gmina Skała

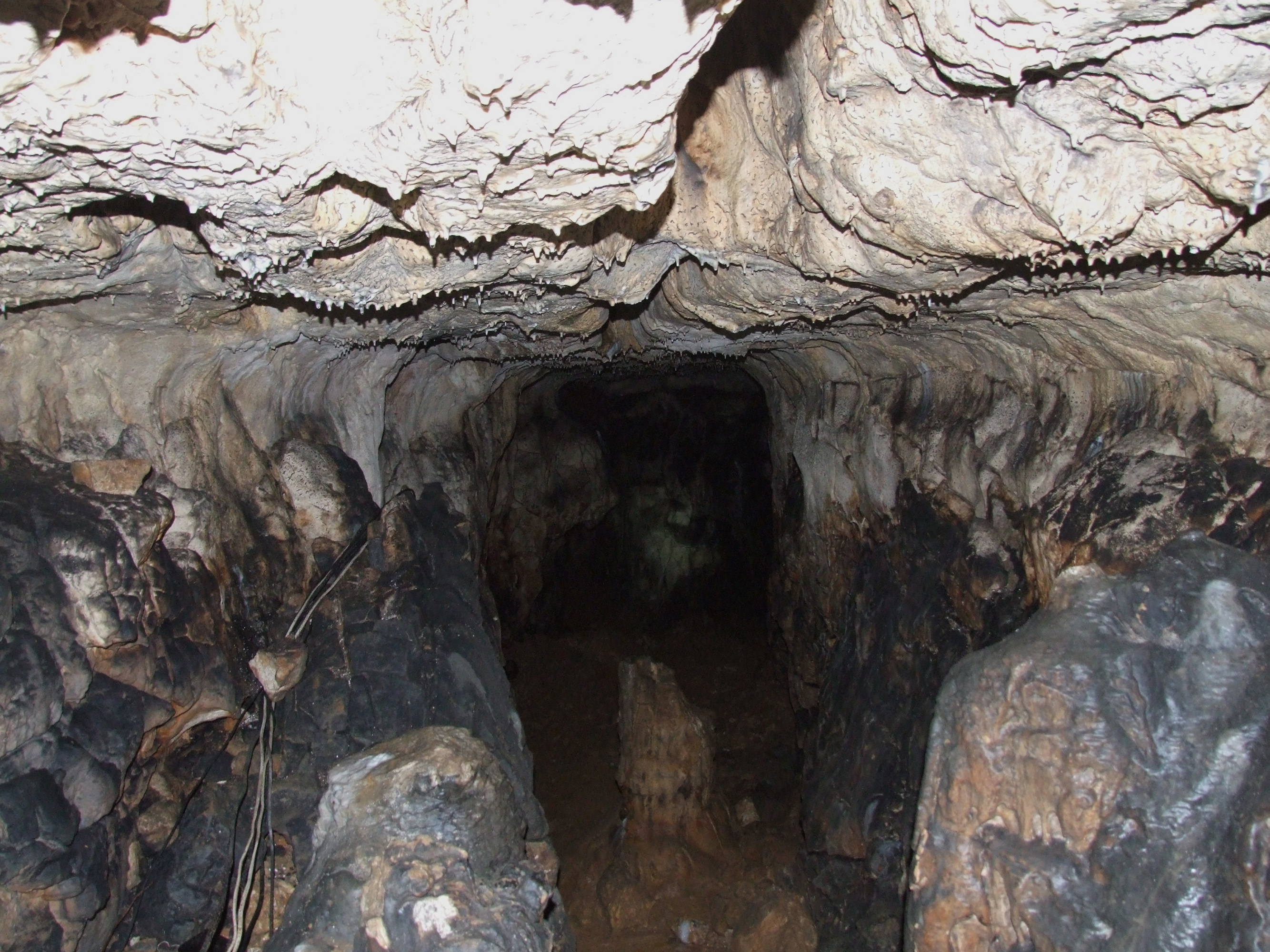
Wierzchowska Górna Cave

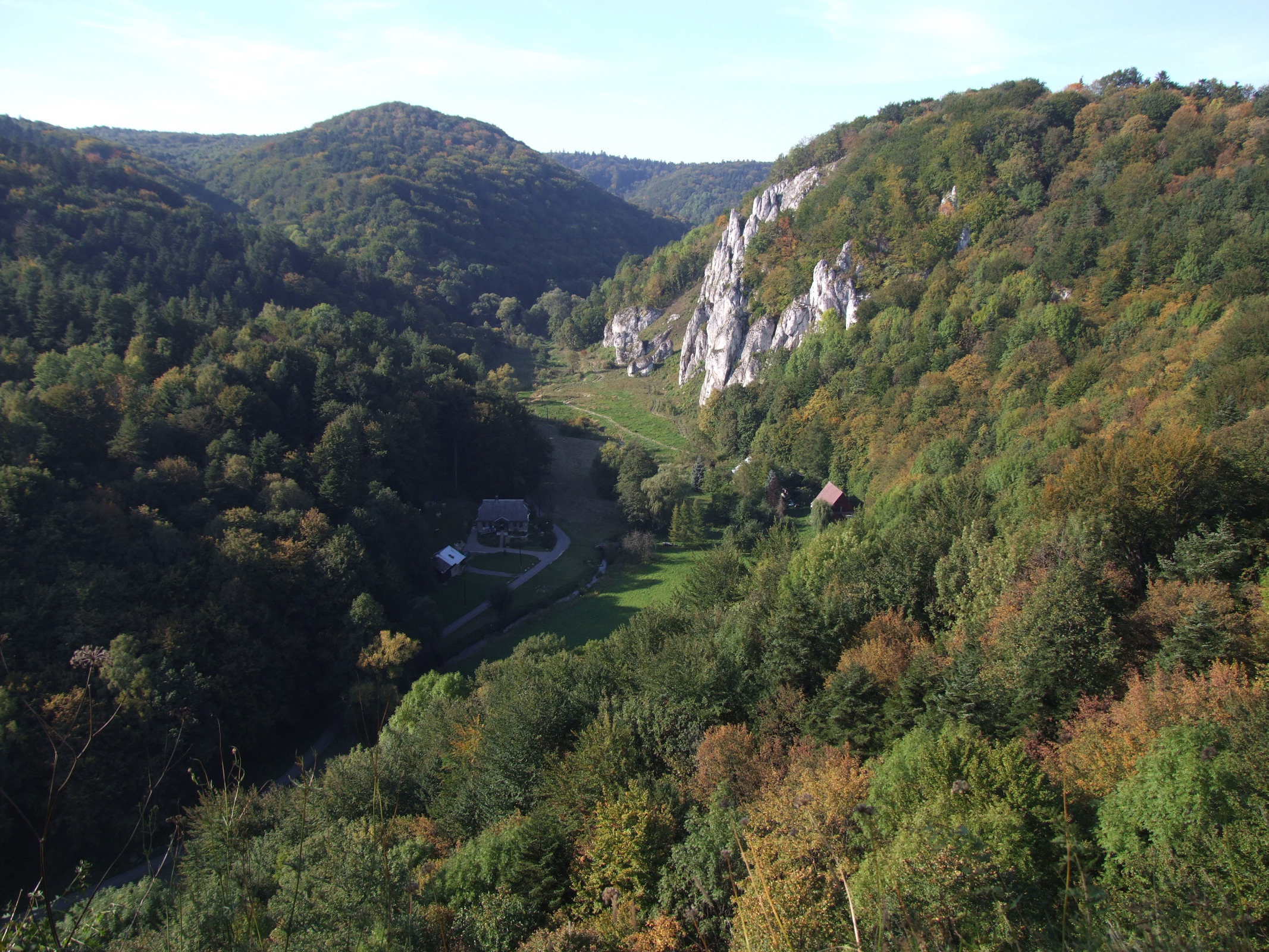
Prądnik river valley

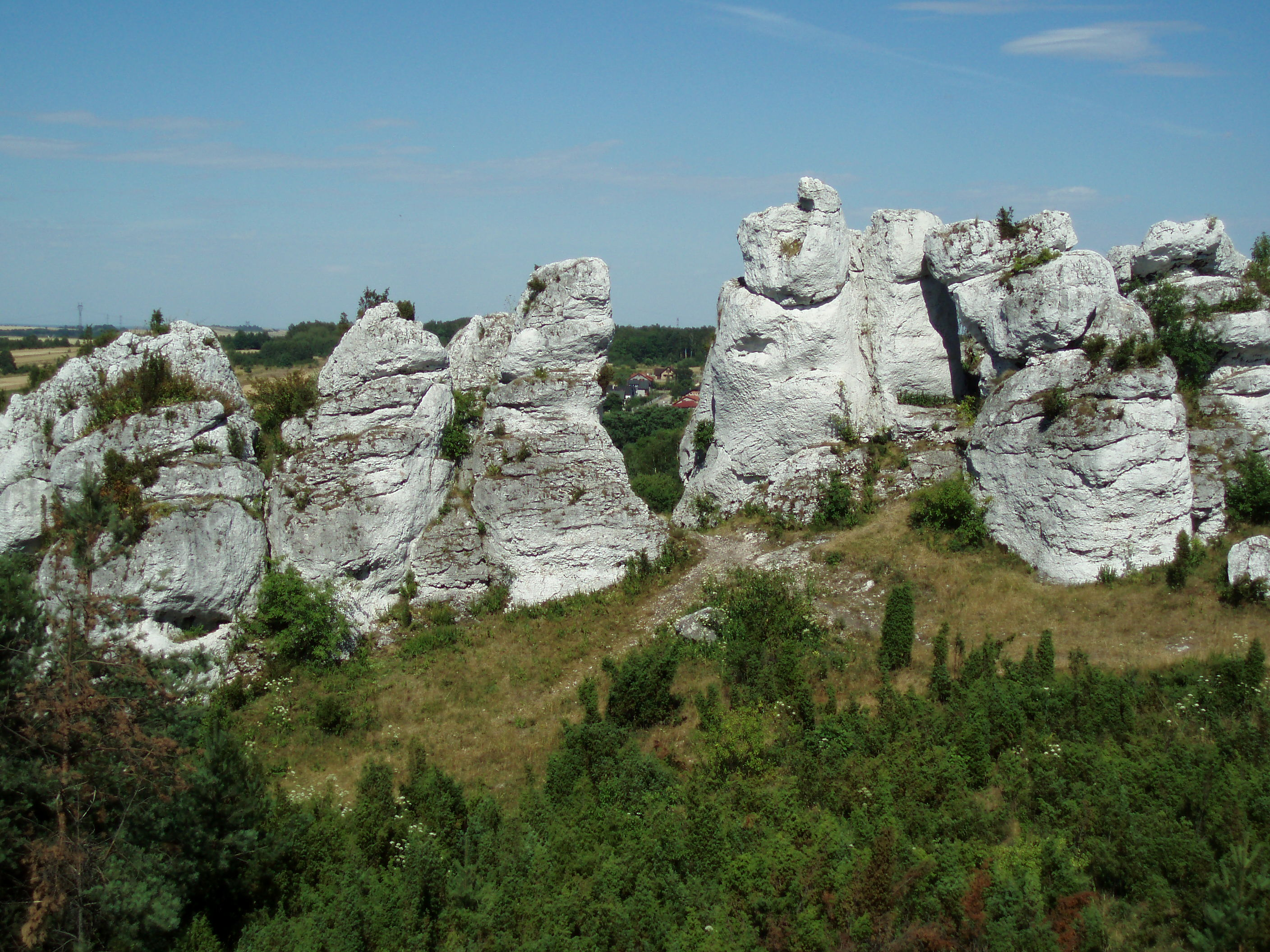
Mount Towarne

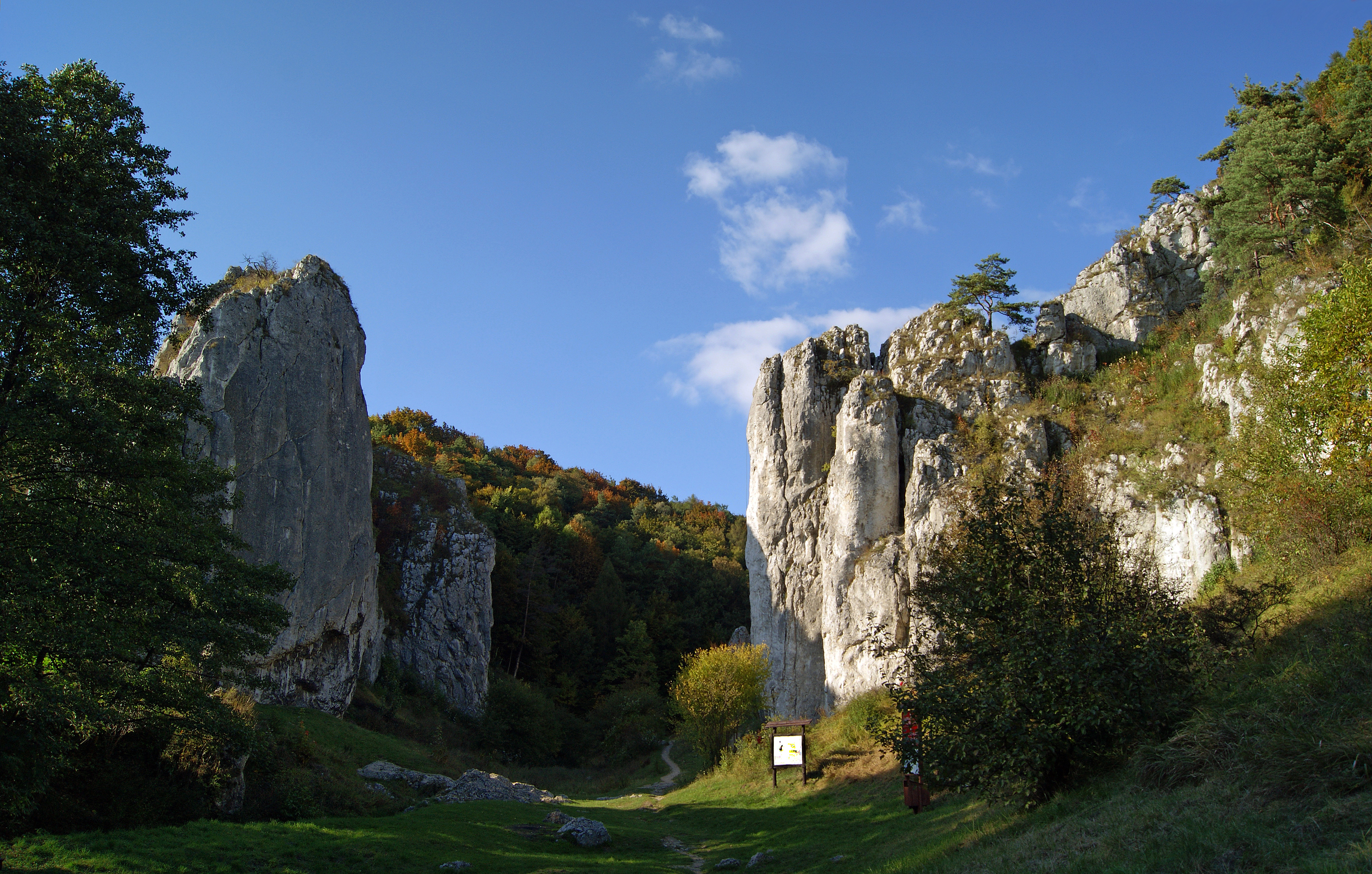
Bolechowicka Gate

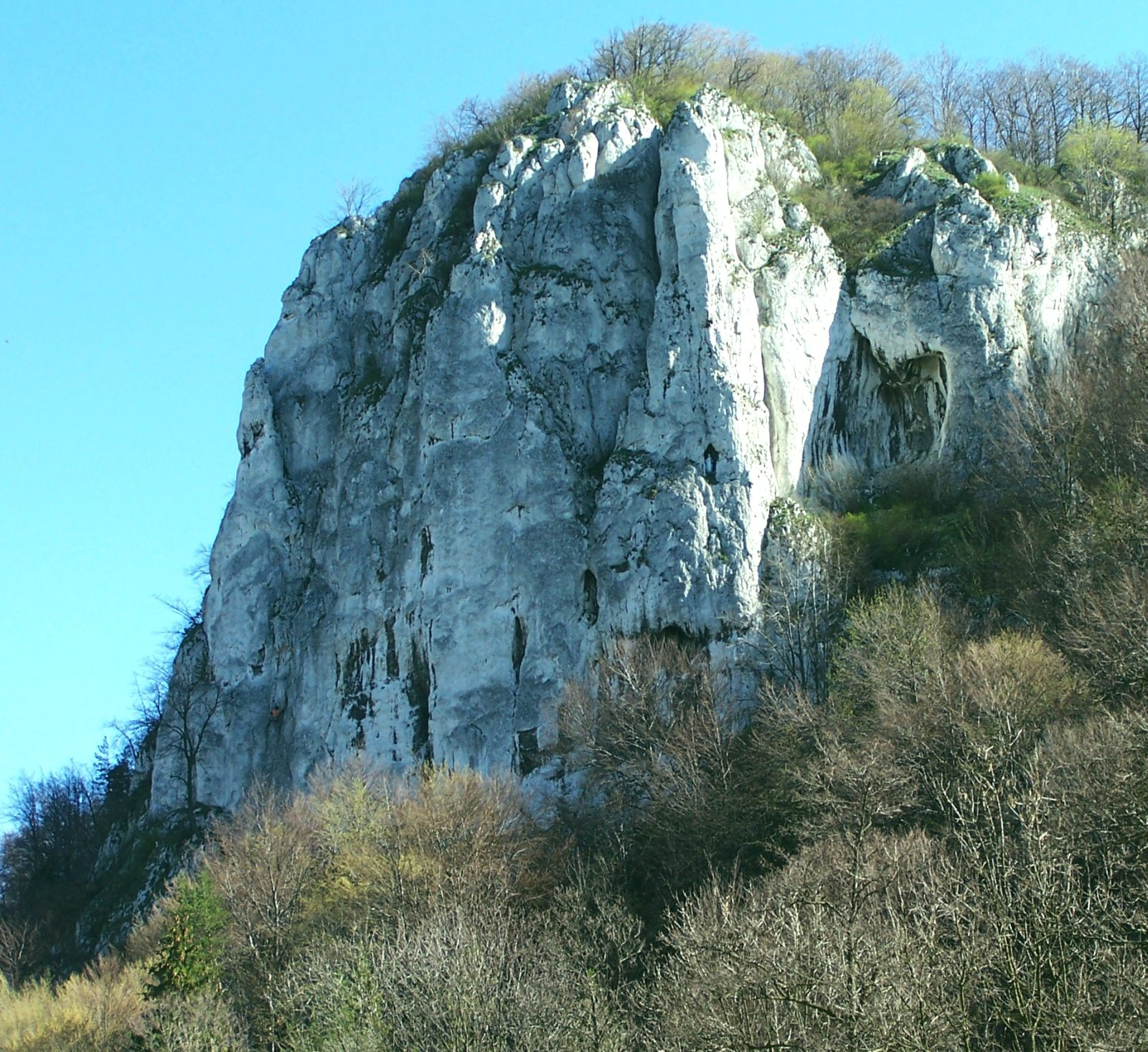
Sokolica

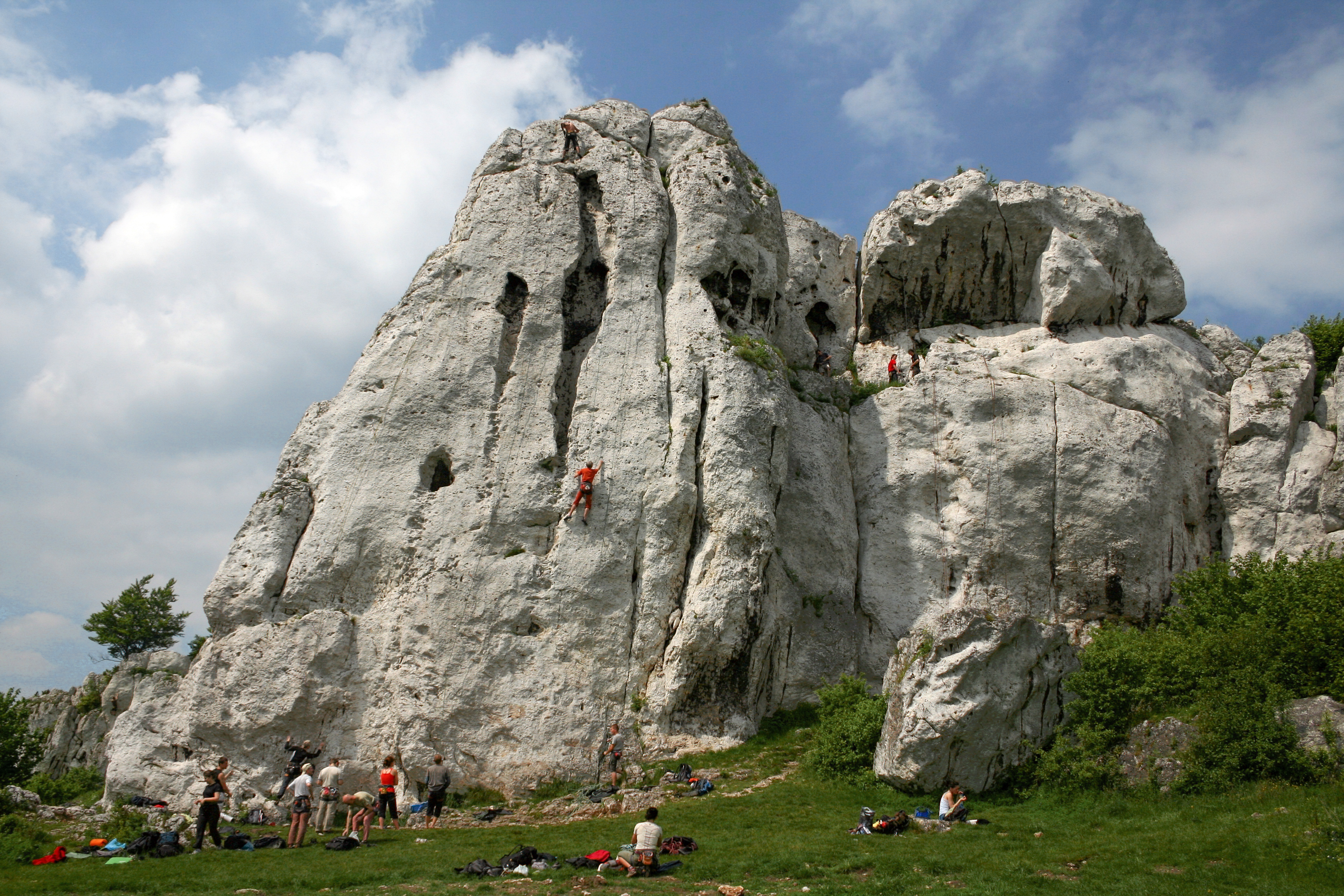
Rzędkowickie rocks

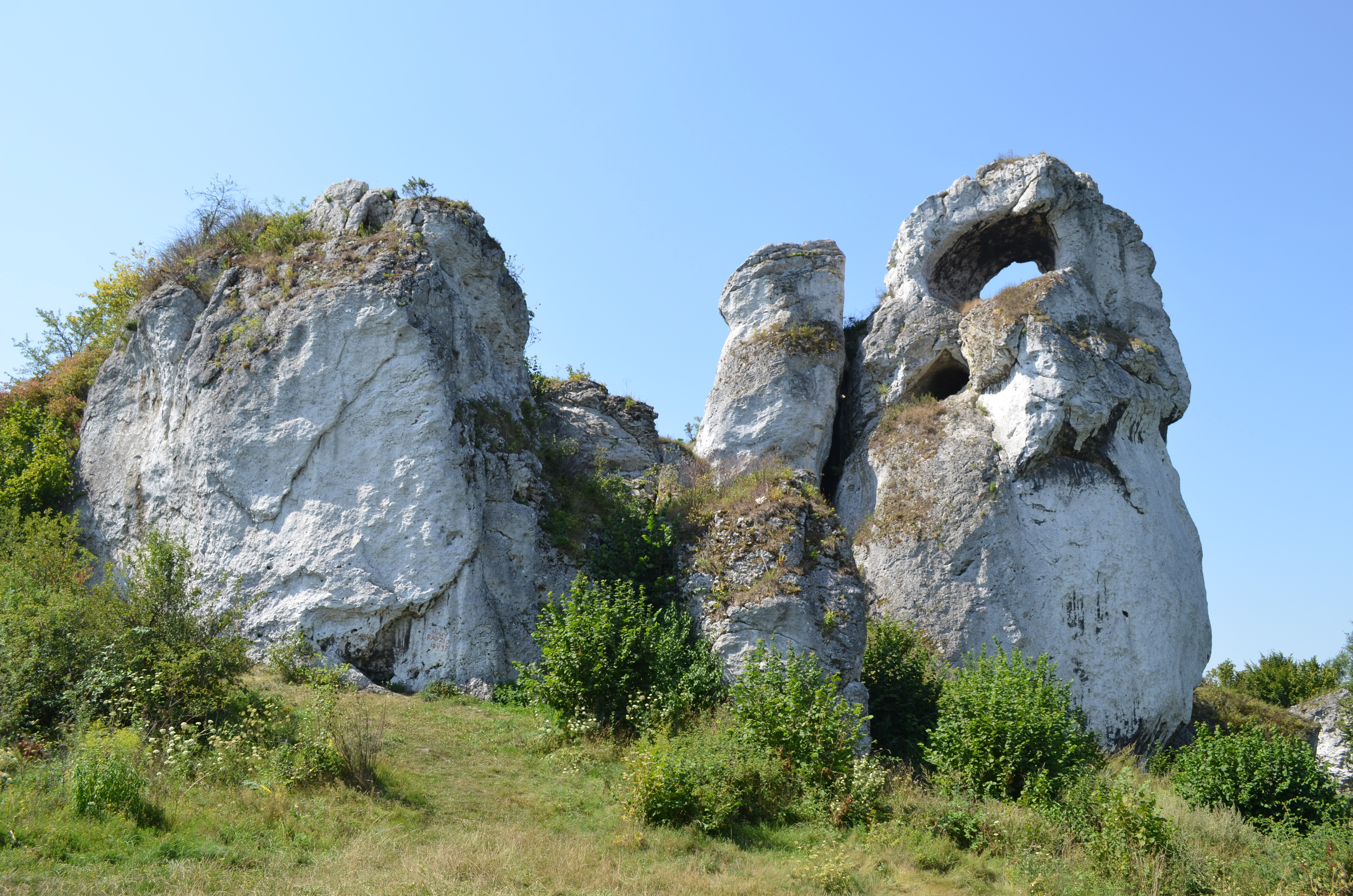
The Great Window

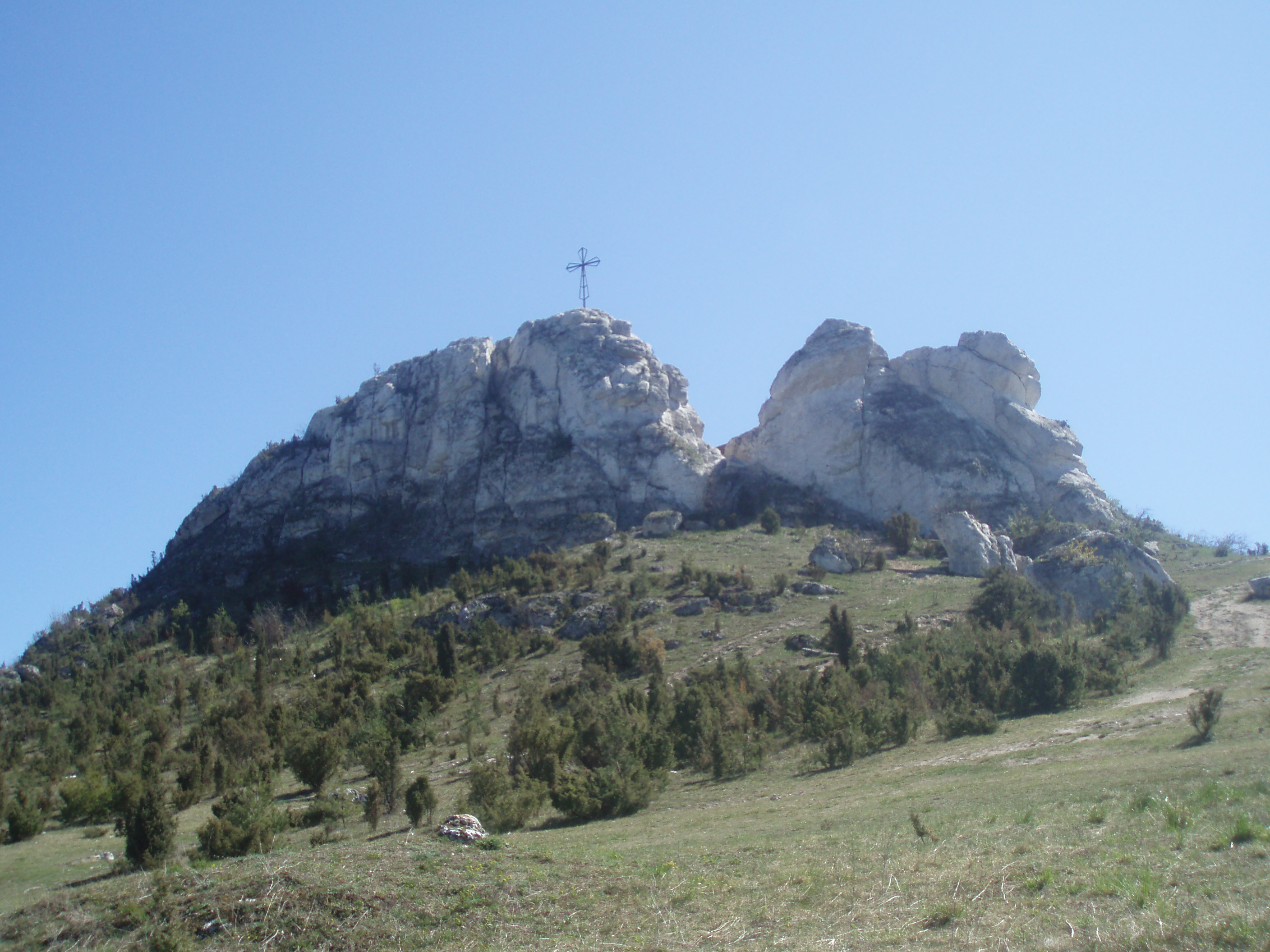

Castles

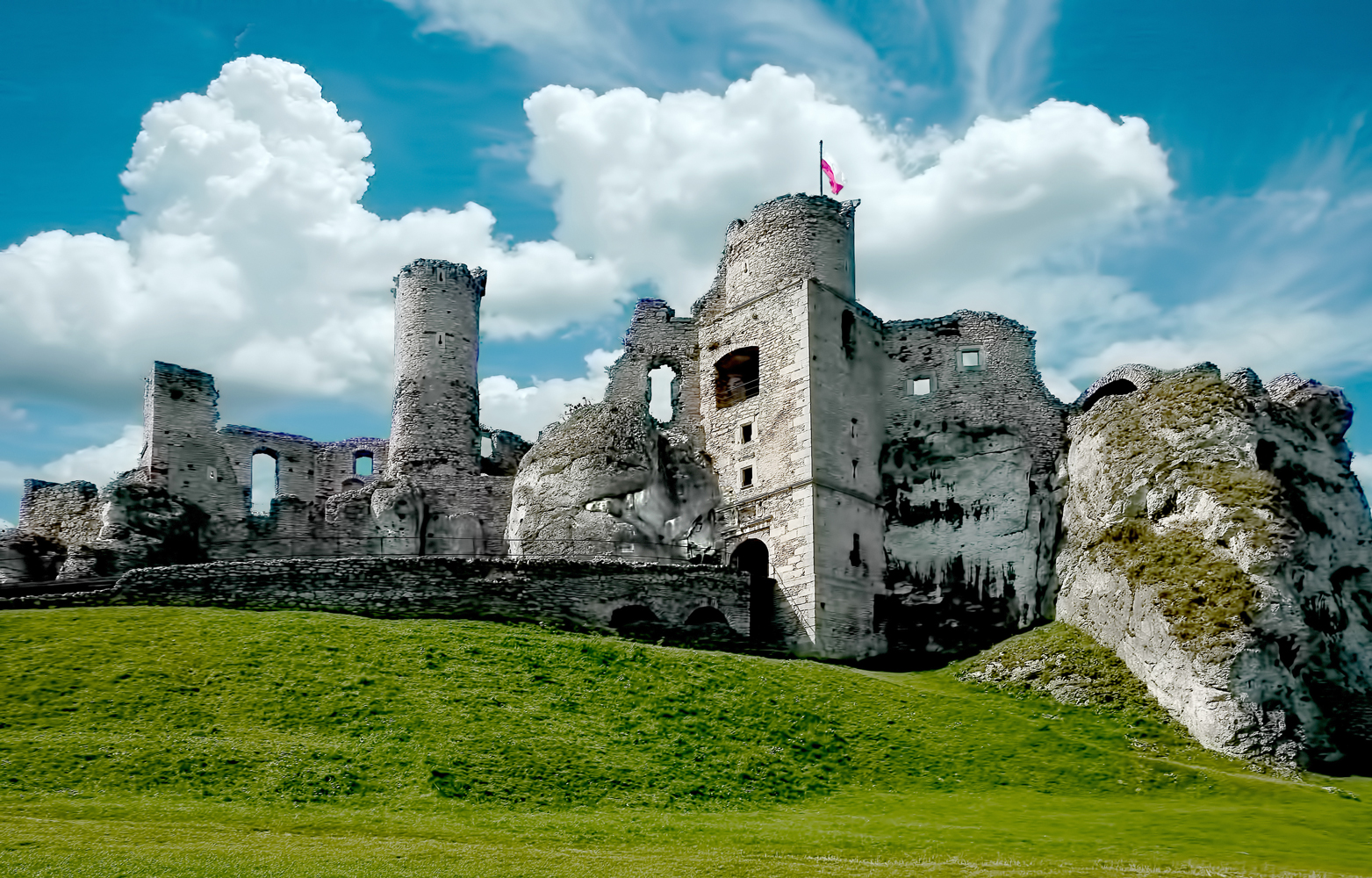
Ruins of the Ogrodzieniec Castle in Podzamcze

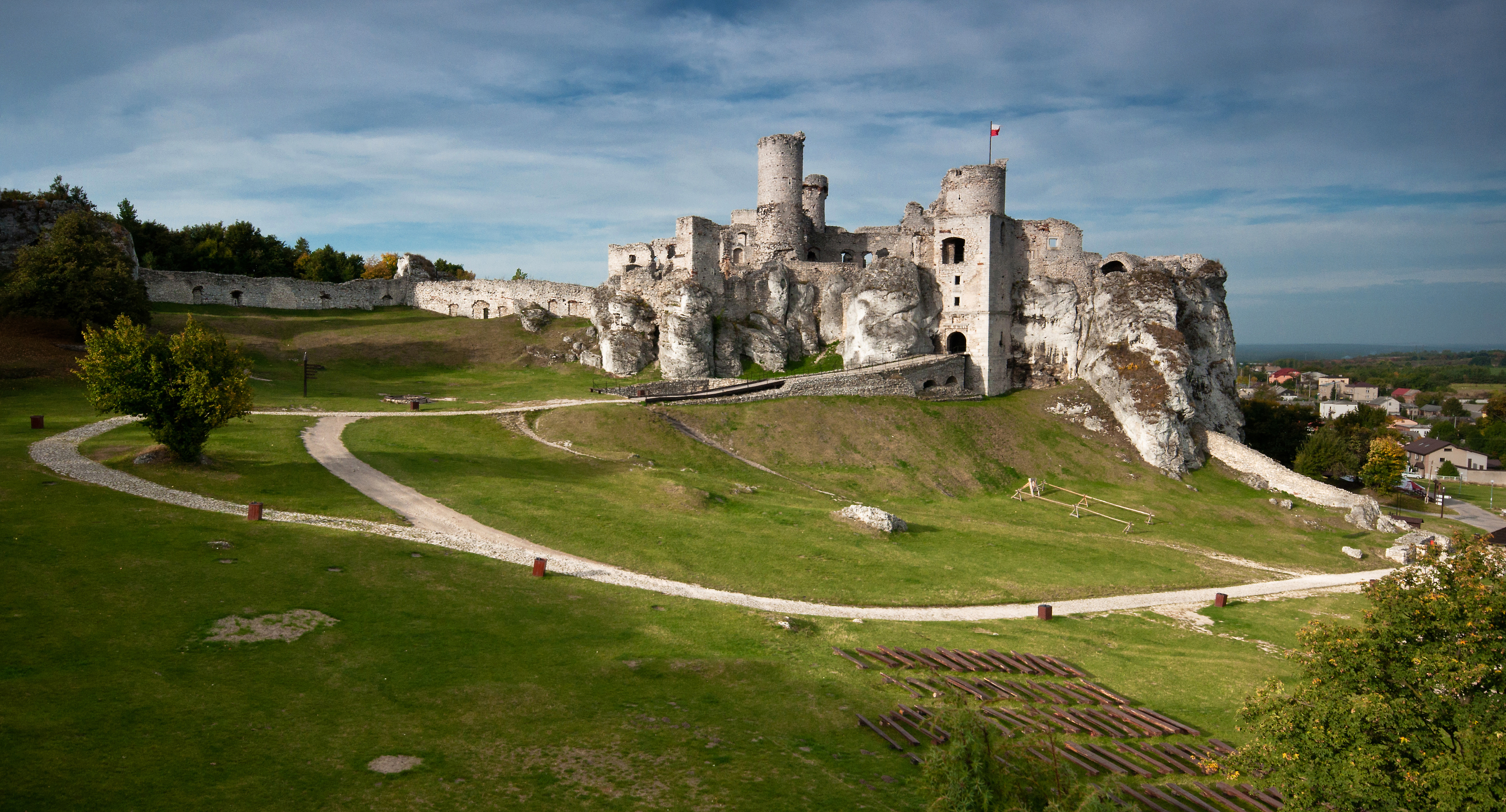
Ruins of the Ogrodzieniec Castle

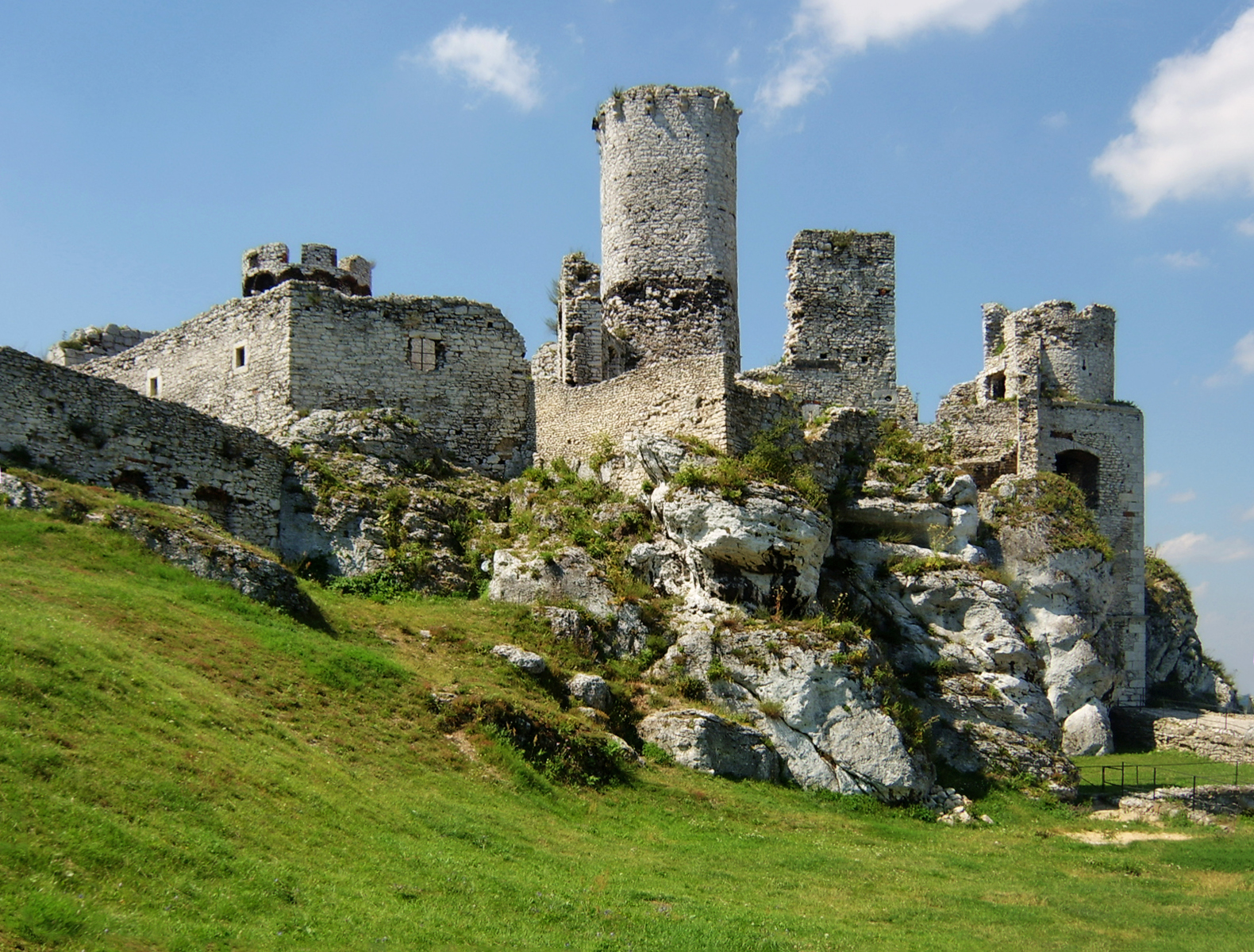
Ruins of the castle Ogrodzieniec

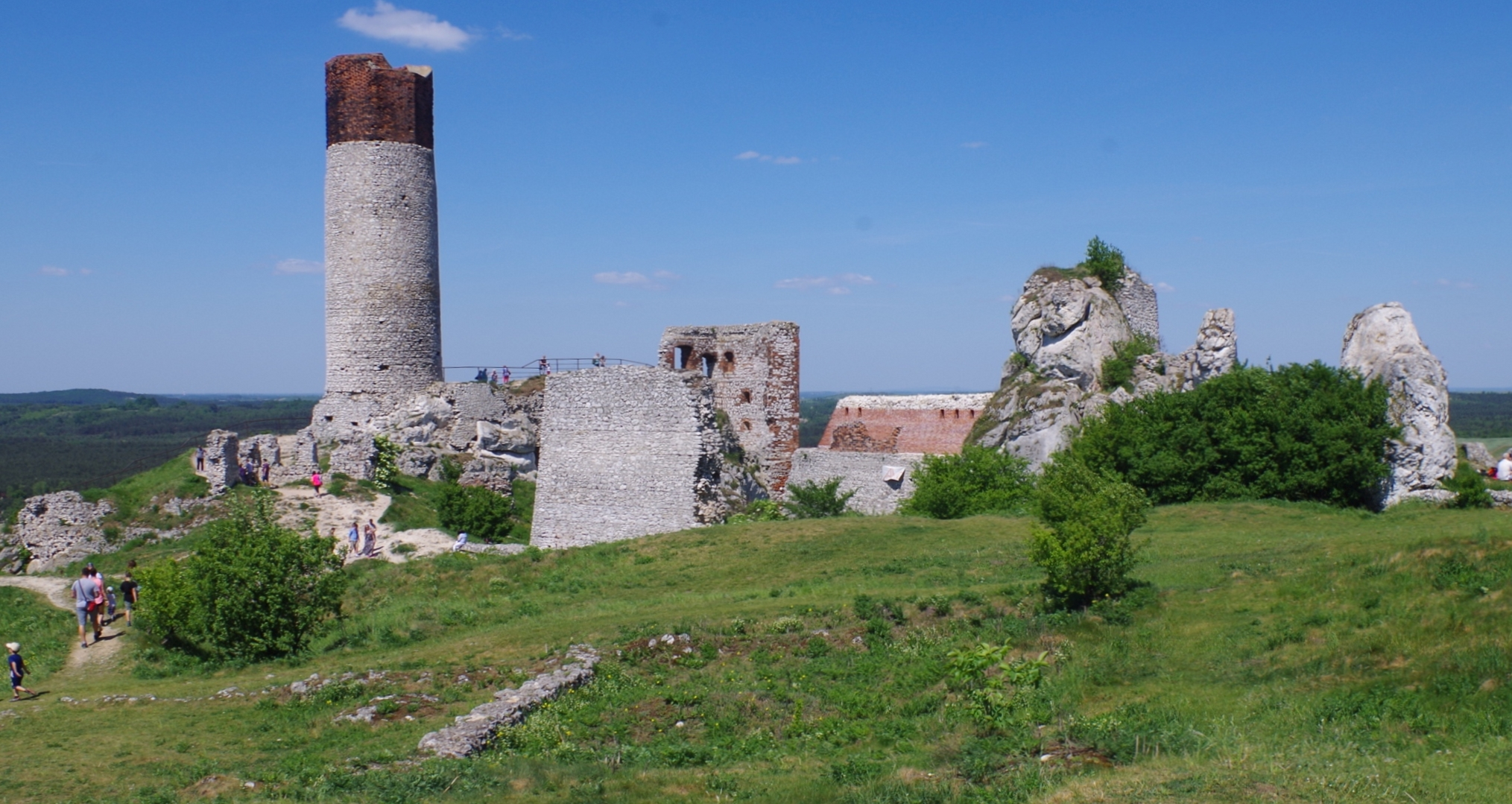
Ruins of Olsztyn Castle

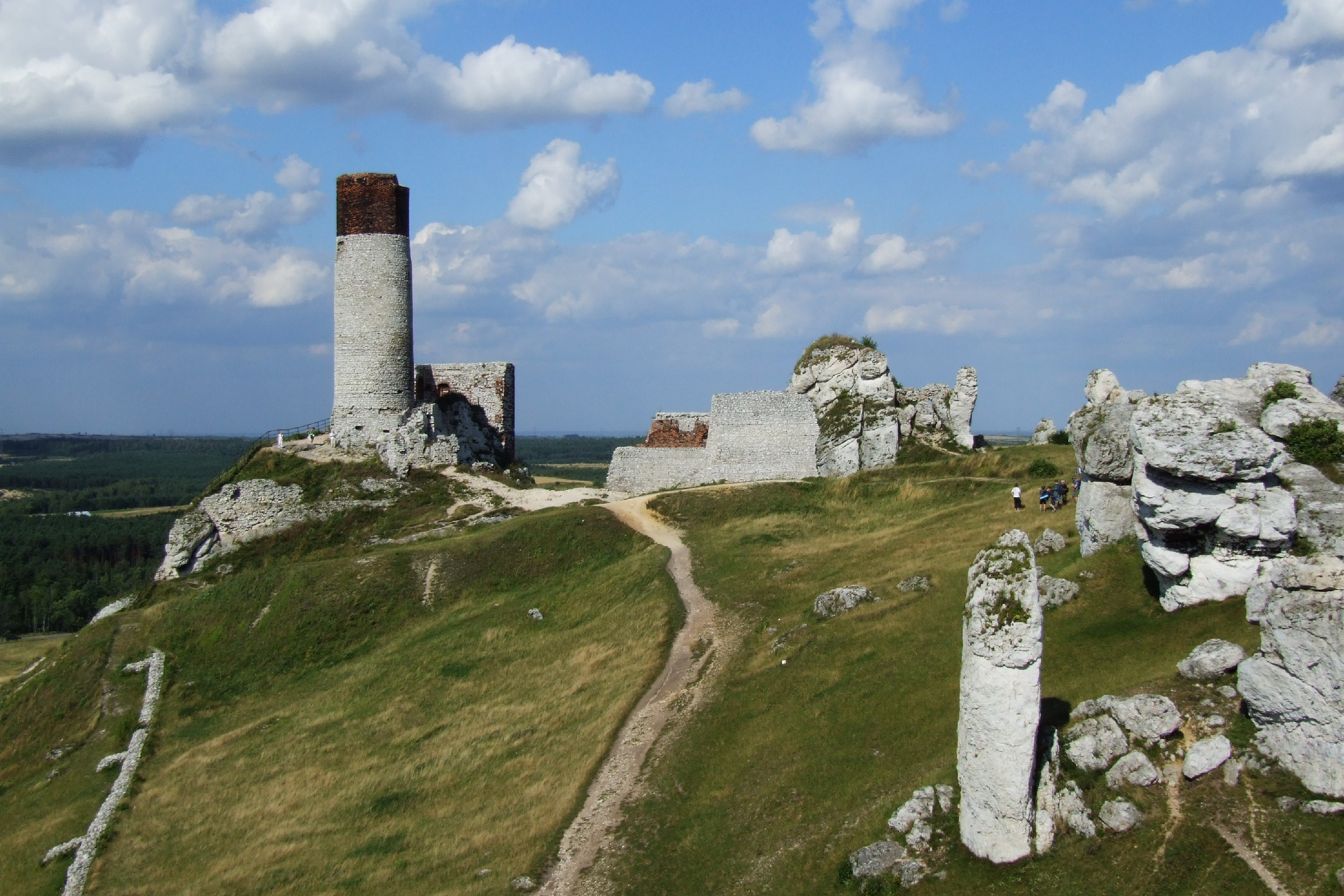
Ruins of the castle Olsztyn

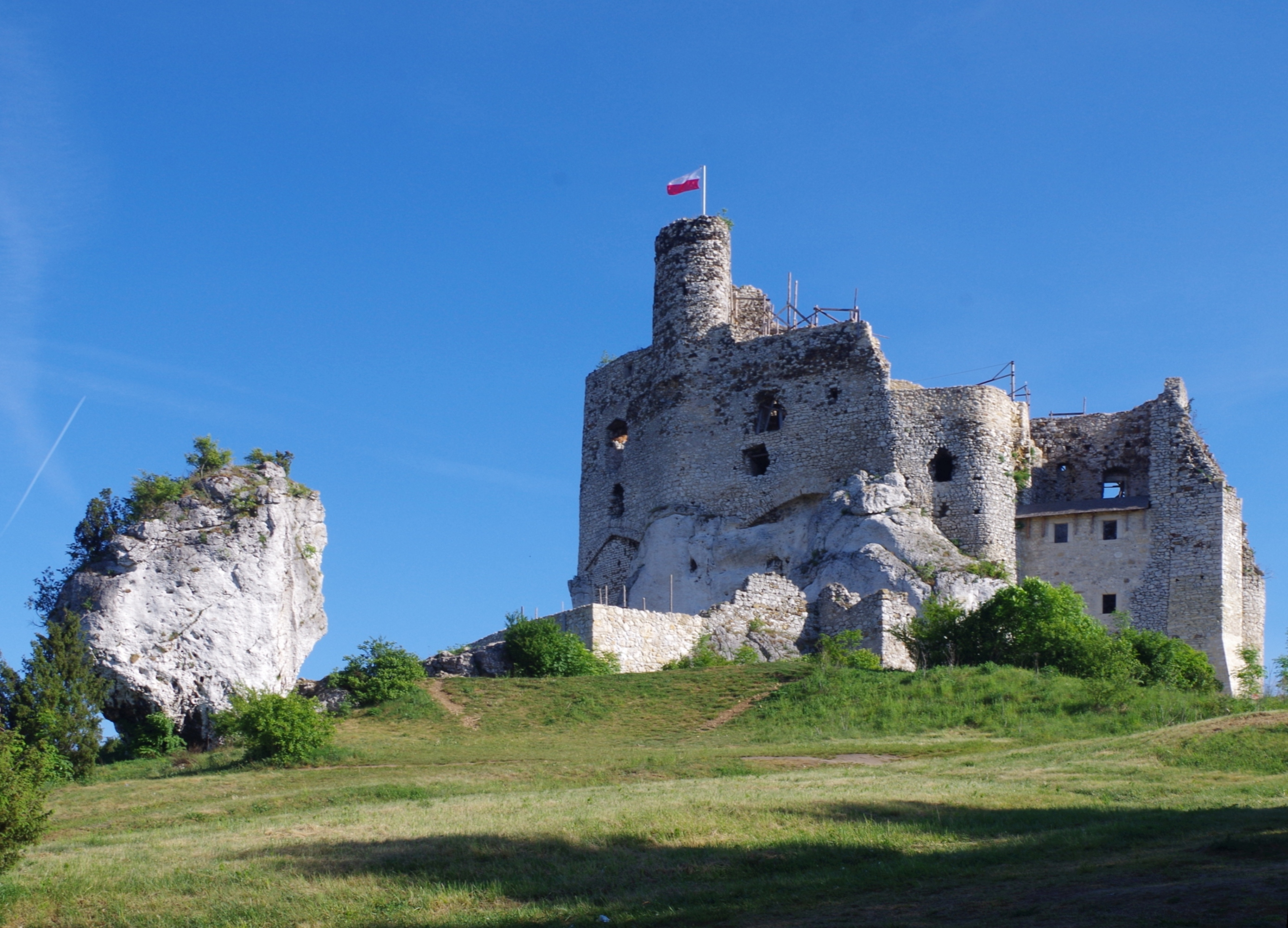
Ruins of Mirów Castle

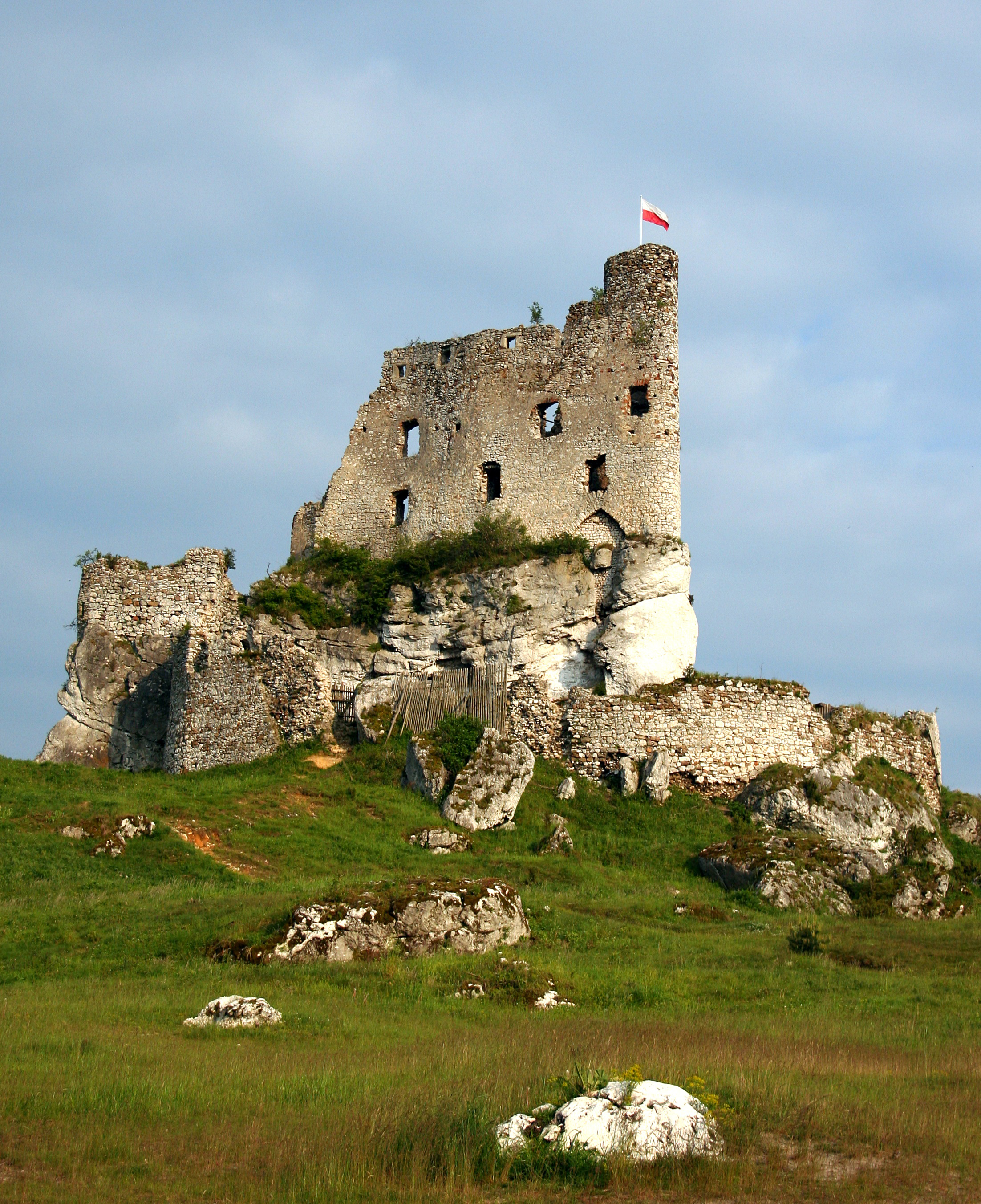
Ruins of the Mirów castle

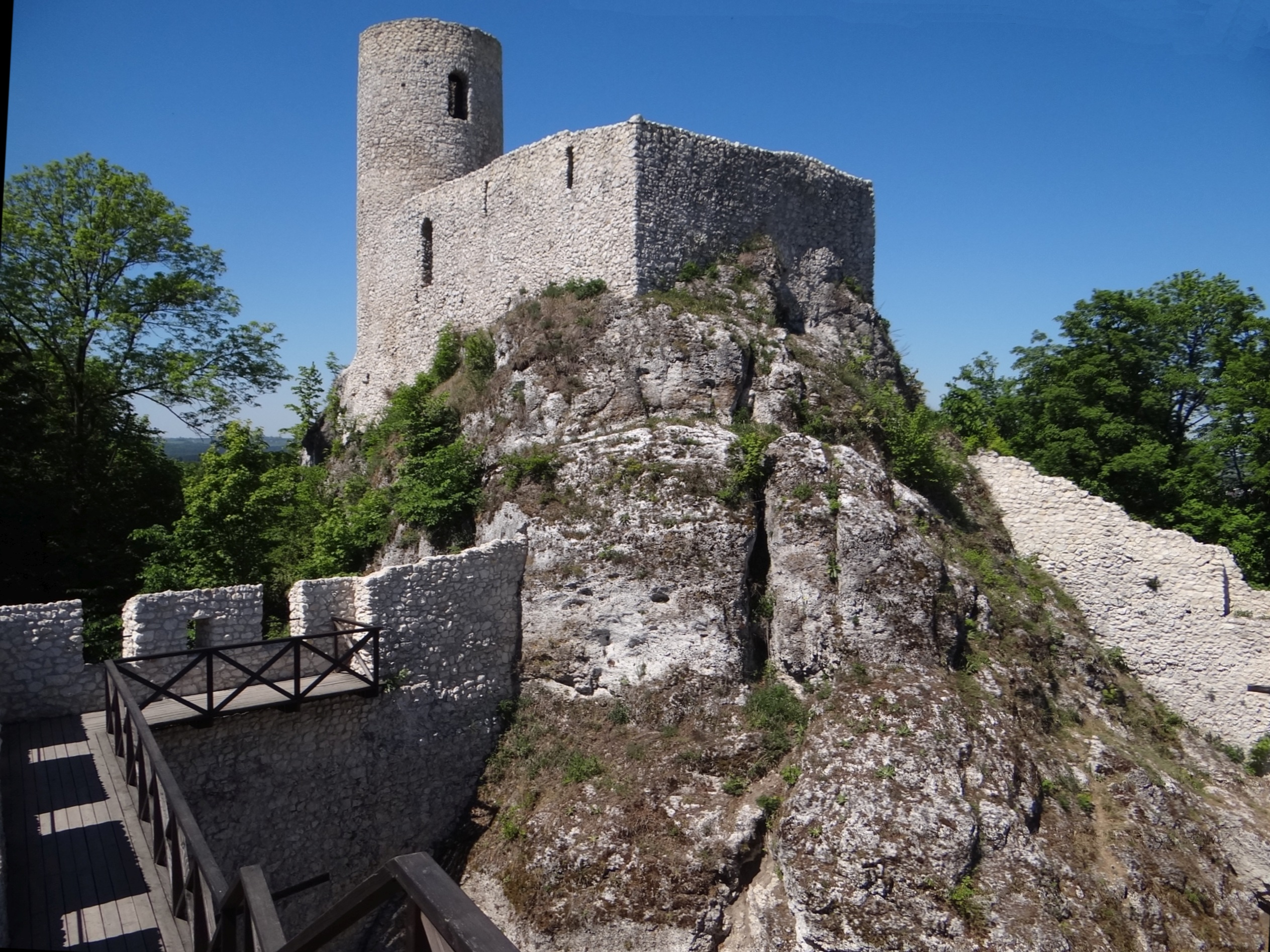
Ruins of Smoleń Castle

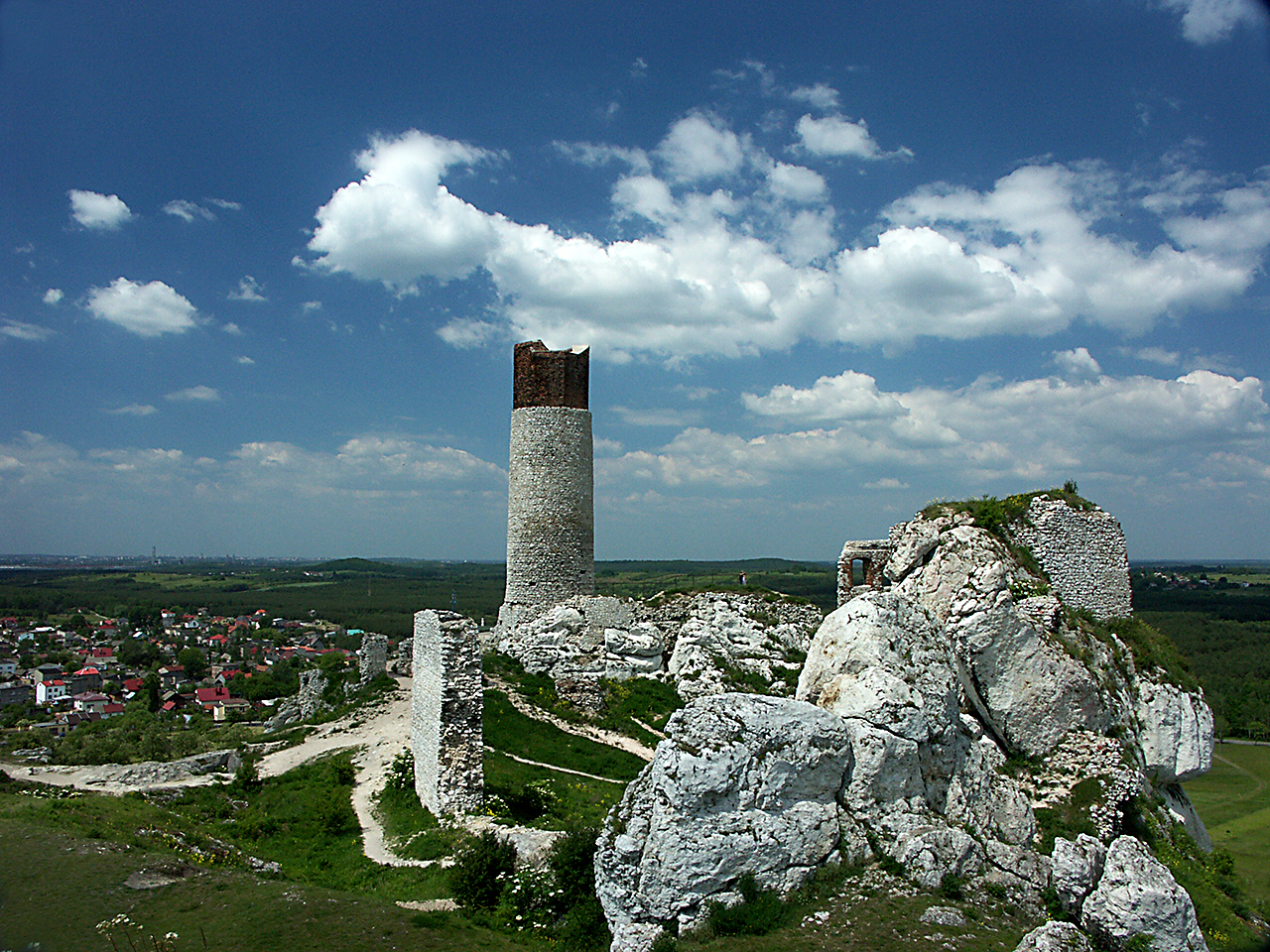
Ruins of Gmina Olsztyn

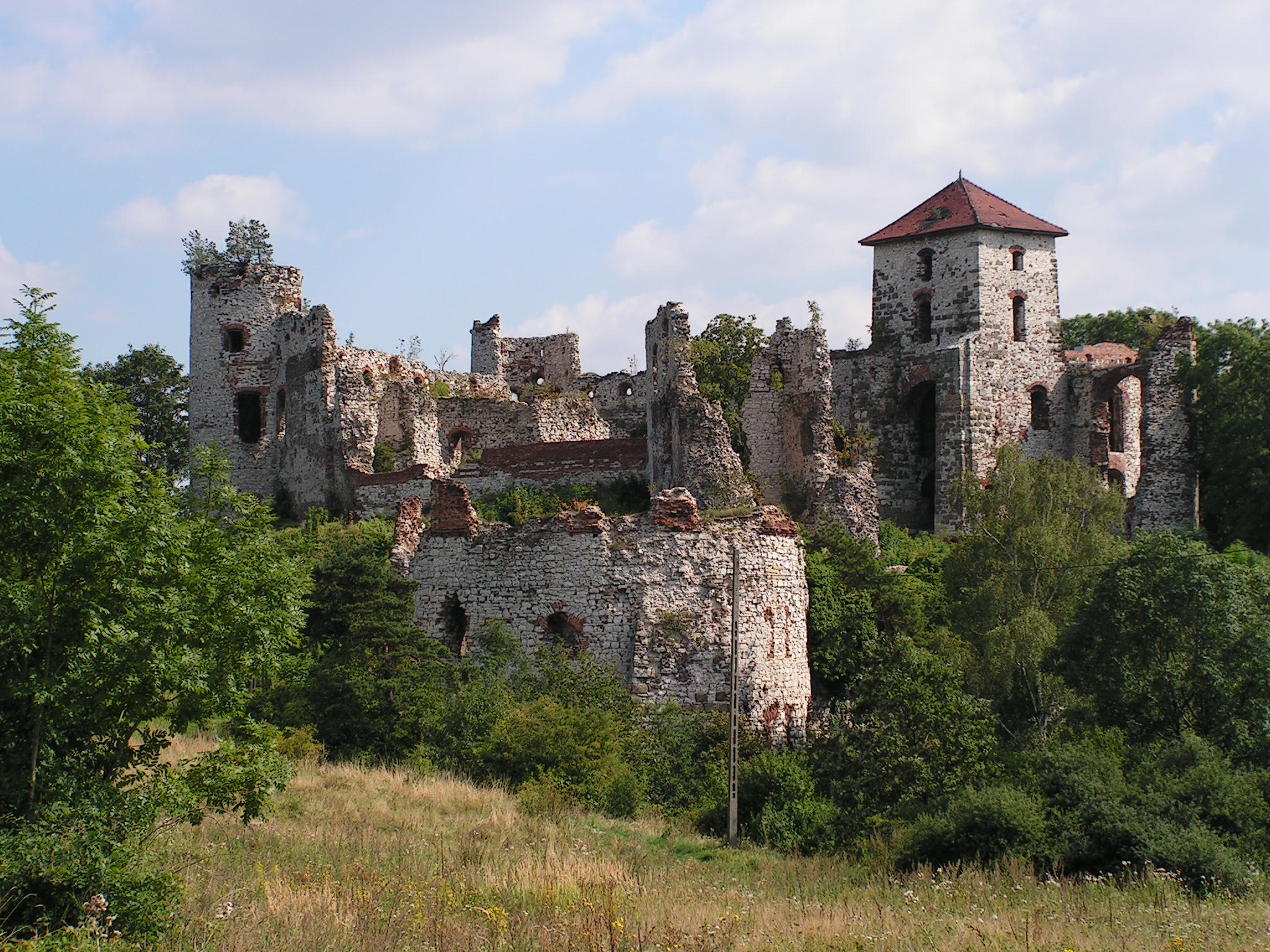
Tenczyn Castle

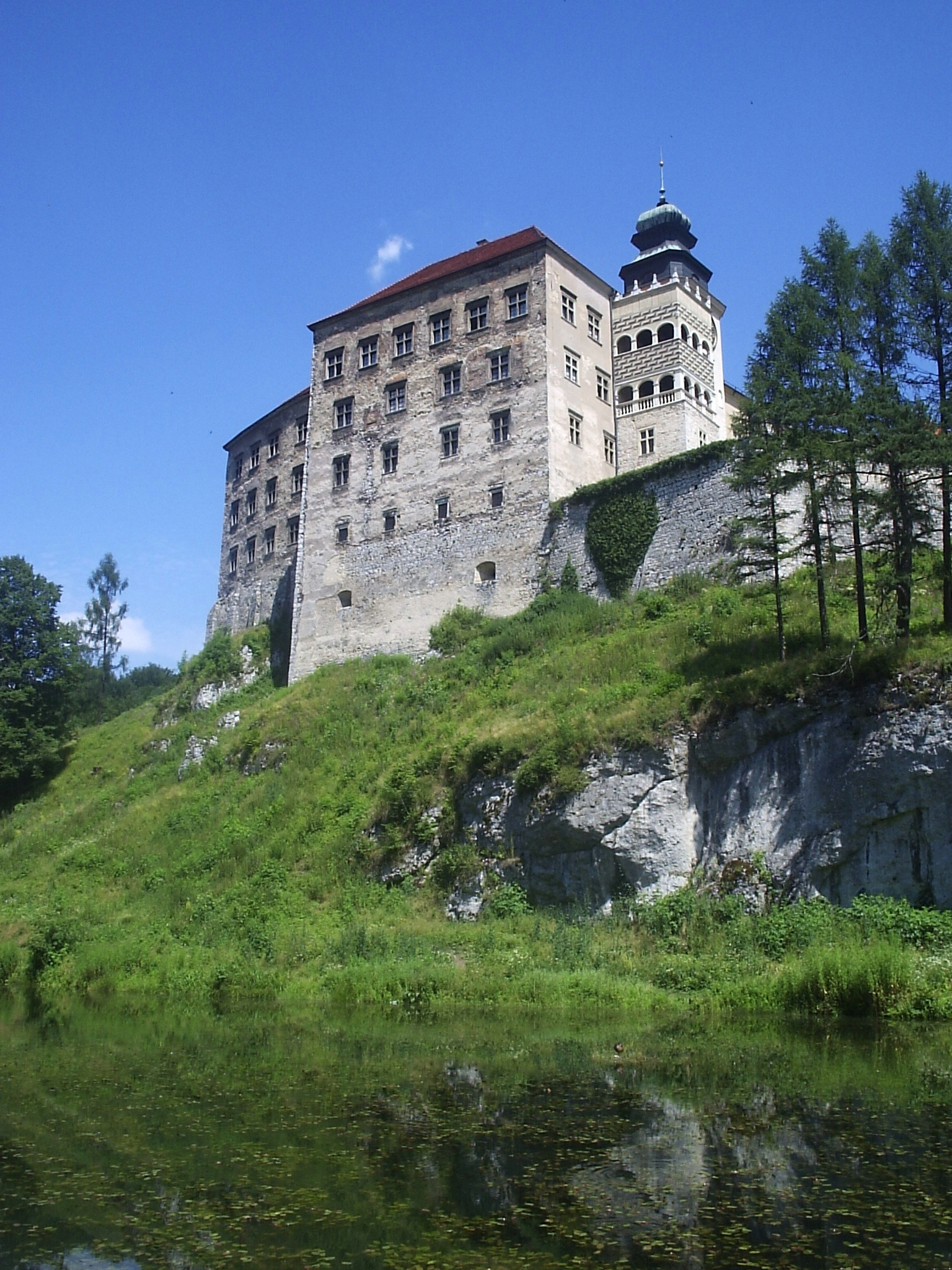
Renaissance castle Pieskowa Skała

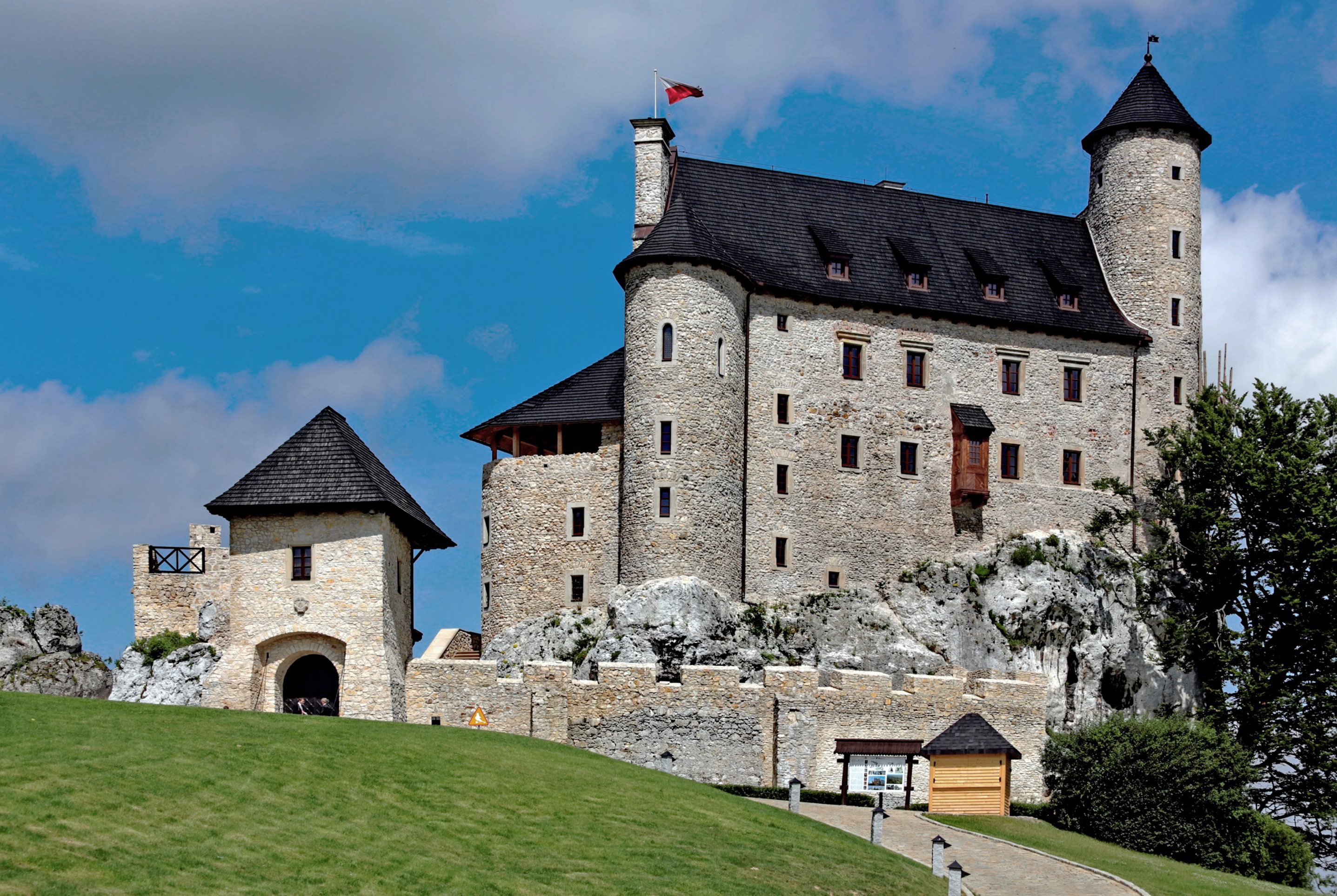
Bobolice Castle (after reconstruction in 2002–11)

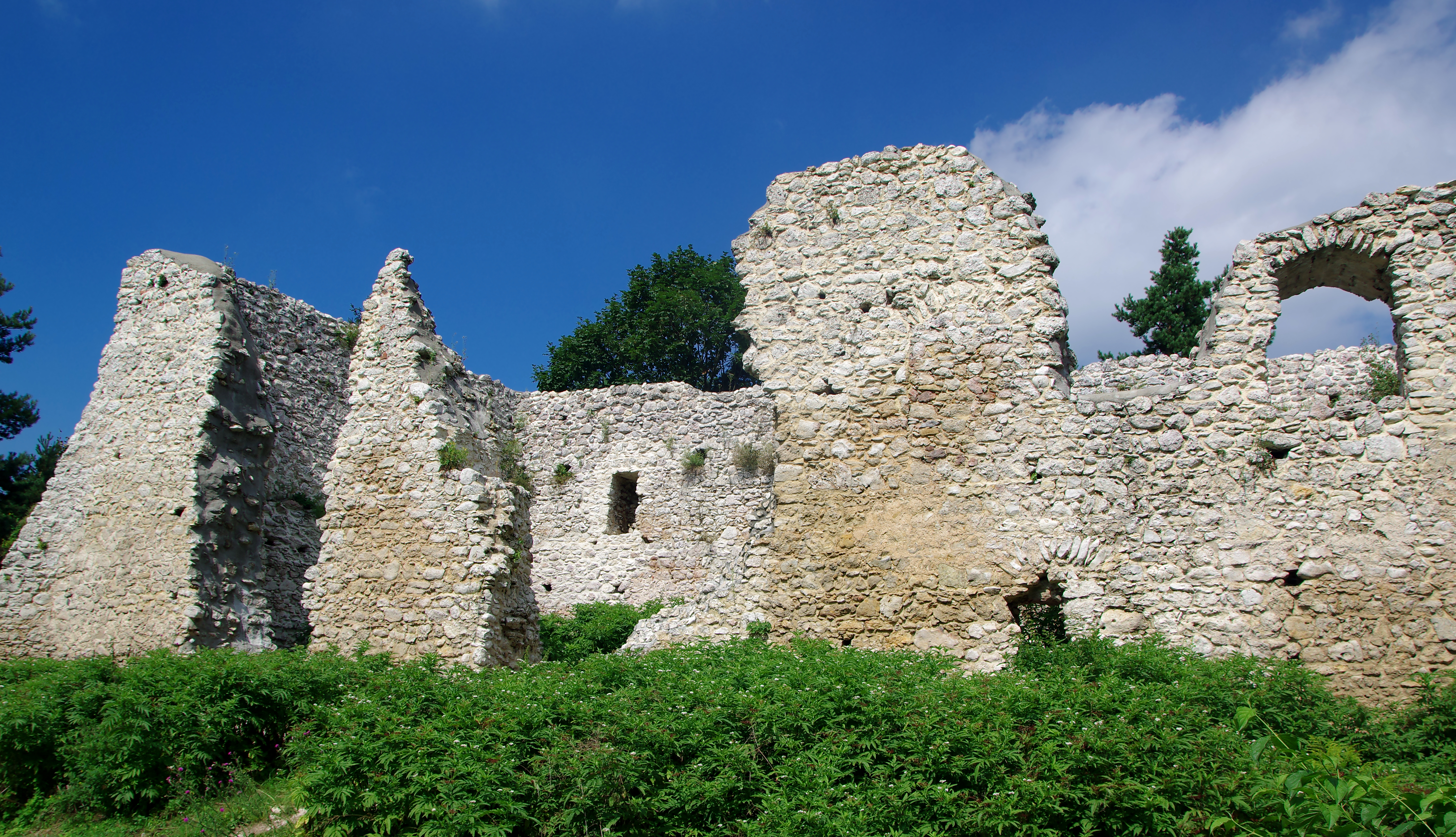
Ruins of the castle Bydlin

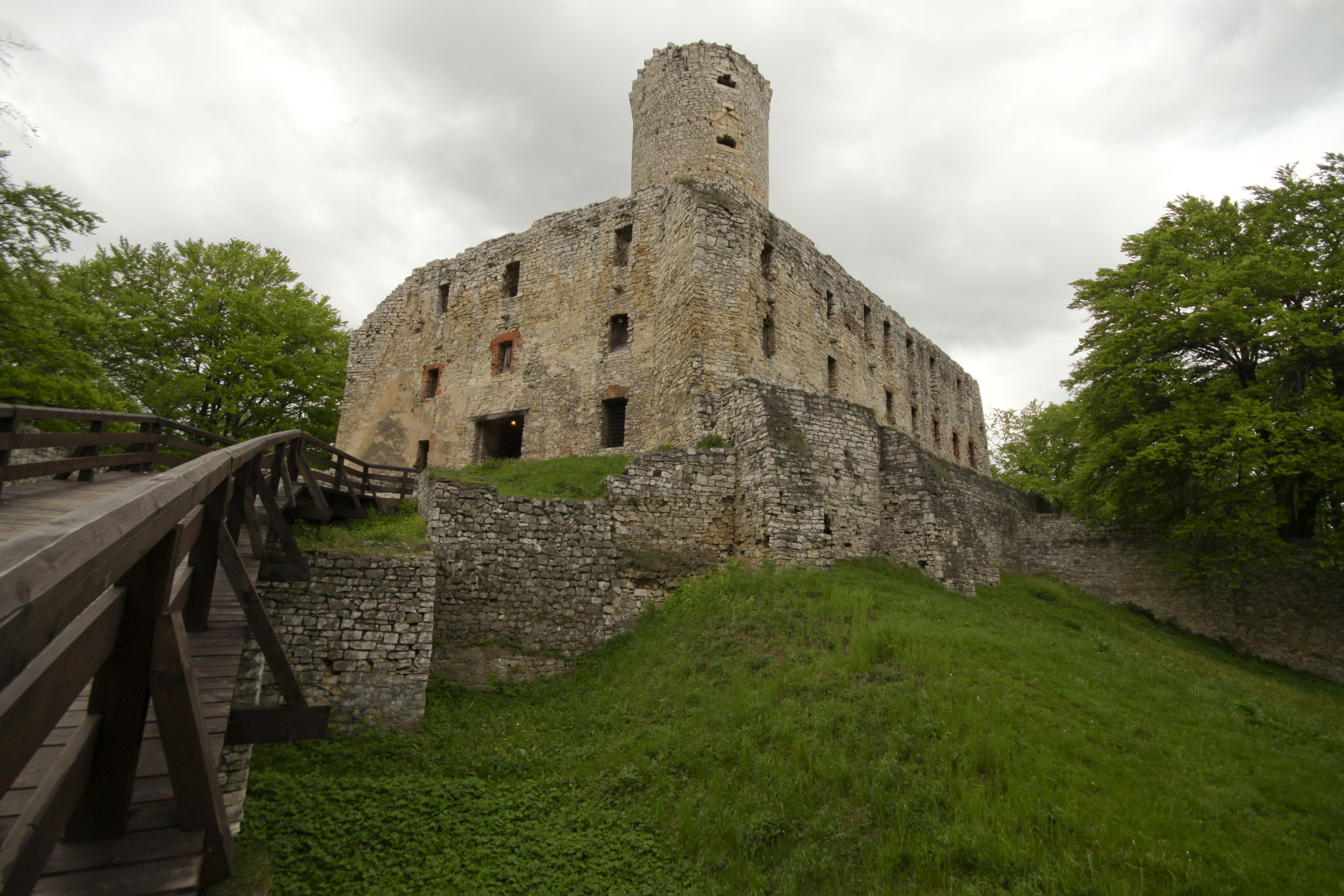
Ruins of the castle Lipowiec

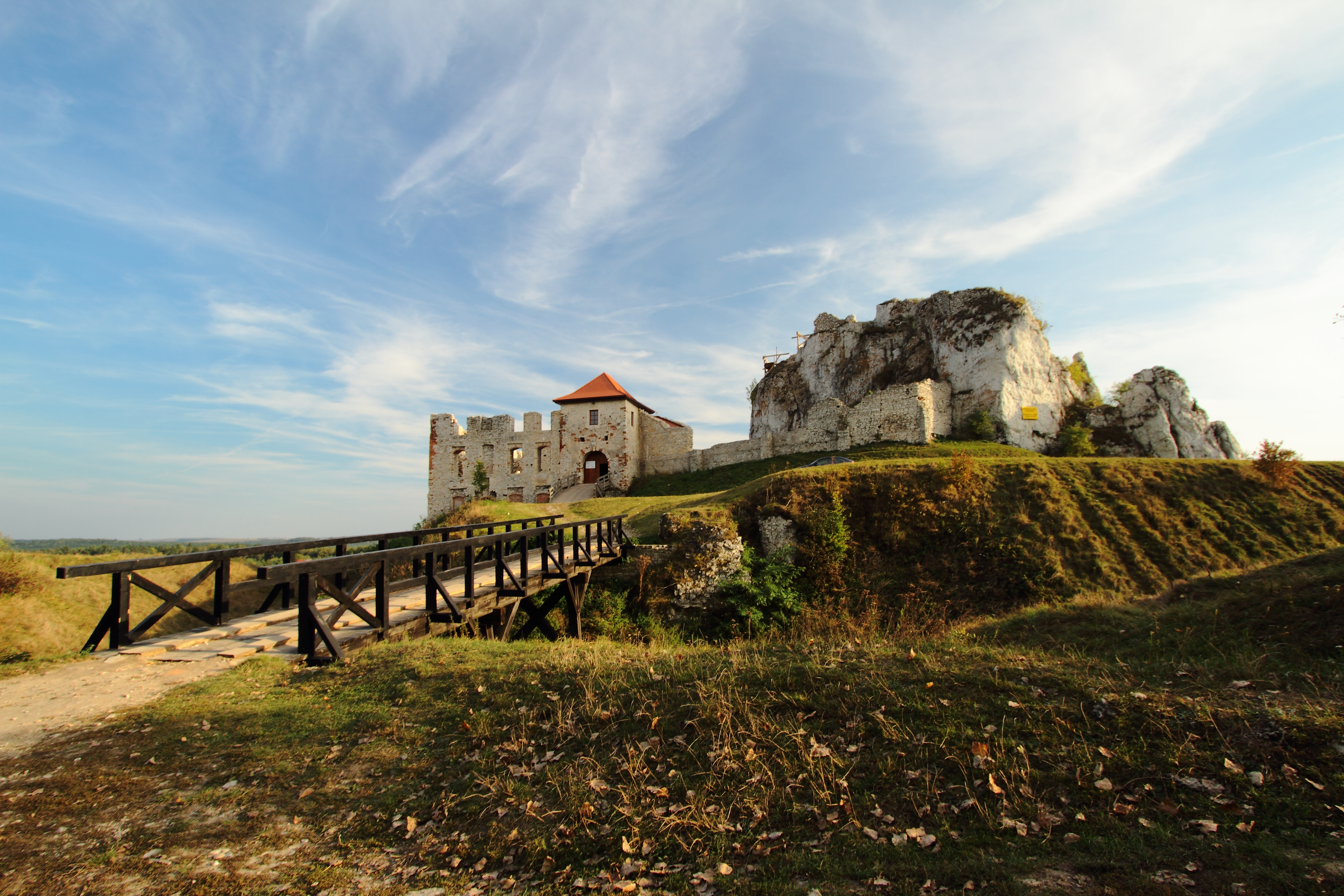
The ruins of the castle Rabsztyn

== See also ==
- Geography of Poland
