= Wioletta Grzegorzewska =

Polish poet and writer

Wioletta Grzegorzewska, Wioletta Greg
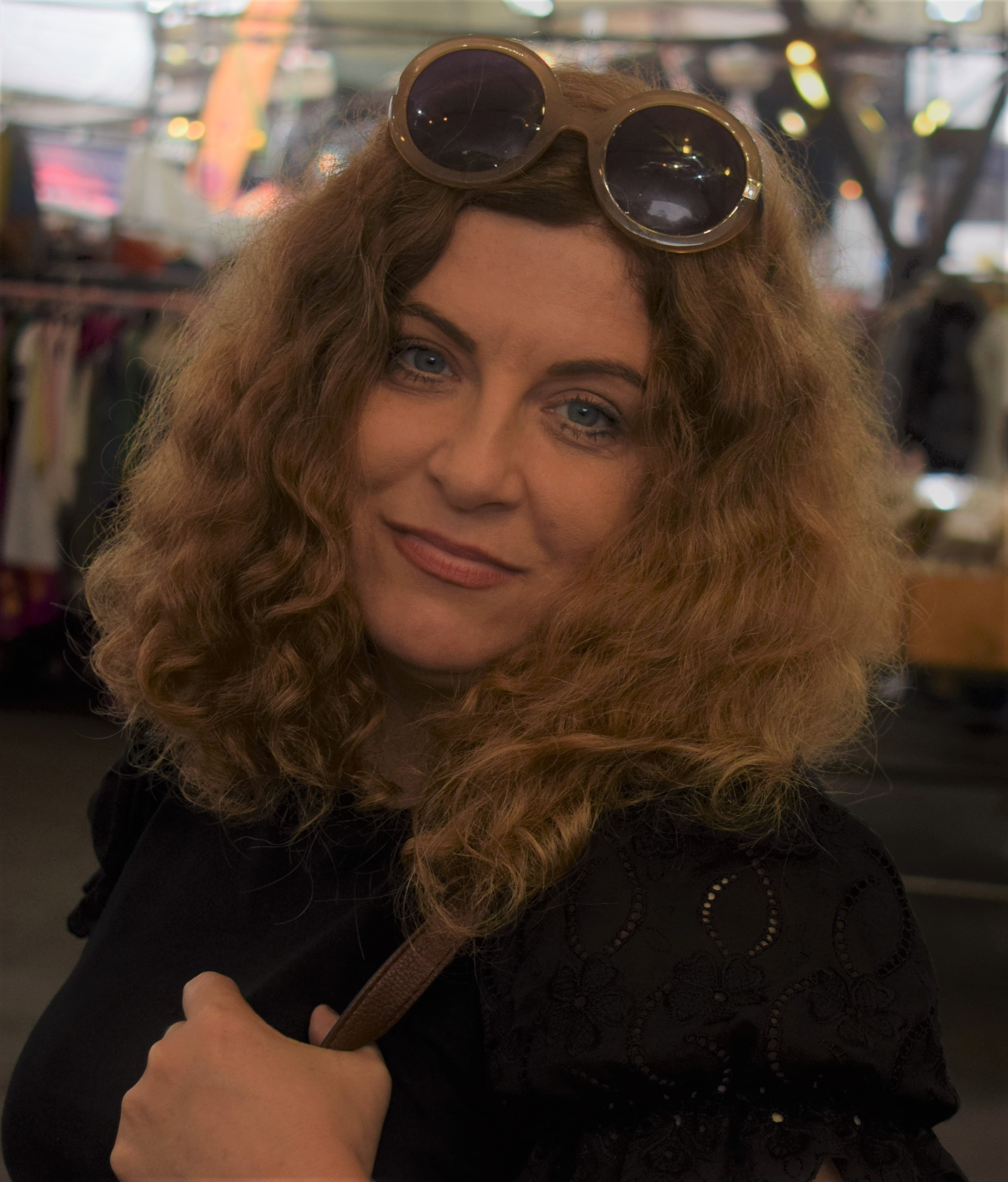
- Born: 9 February 1974; Koziegłowy, Poland
- Occupations: Poet, writer

Wioletta Grzegorzewska, or Wioletta Greg (1974) is a Polish poet and writer nominated for The Man Booker Prize.

== Life ==
Wioletta born in Koziegłowy, lived in a small village Rzeniszów in Jurassic Highland in Poland. In 2006, she left her country and moved to England, to the Isle of Wight. She spent there ten years in Ryde. She lives now in Lewes.

== Works ==
Between 1998 – 2012 she published several poetry volumes, novels as well as a novella Swallowing Mercury, in which she's covering her childhood and the experience of growing up in Communist Poland. Senior editor Max Porter from Portobello Books said:

Swallowing Mercury is an enchanting and intriguing book. Wioletta Greg is a poet and every line of this haunting autobiographical novella has its own weird, beautiful atmosphere. It reminded me of Evie Wyld, Ludmila Petrushevskaya and Herta Muller."

Greg's short stories and poems have been published in: Asymptote, The Guardian, Litro Magazine, Poetry Wales, Wasafiri, The White Review.

Her poetry book Finite Formulae & Theories of Chance has been shortlisted for the 2015 Griffin Poetry Prize. "Finite Formulae & Theories of Chance shortlisted for the Griffin Poetry Prize!"]. The judges said:

"These poems retain the force of first experience and, equally, a collection of history’s remains. Greg’s thoughts include the catastrophe of the 20th century whose marks still wobble before her eyes, and the experience of living in post-Communist Poland. This stunning collection shows us (mostly through the eyes and memories of childhood) a world of objects transported across years. ‘Tossing satin bulbs into wicker baskets,’ the child poet is at ease with the earth and the hardy objects made from it. Greg grants us the privilege of seeing what she saw before she saw more."

In 2012 an Arts Council-funded audio recording project of the British Library, Between Two Worlds: Poetry and Translation, recorded her poetry. Her poems have been translated into English, Italian, German, Catalan, Serbian, Spanish, and Welsh.

== Books ==
Poetry

- Wyobraznia kontrolowana, Częstochowa, 1998
- Parantele, Częstochowa, 2003
- Orinoko, Tychy, 2008. ISBN 83-88415-77-8
- Inne obroty, Polish-Canadian Publishing Fund and Fraza, Toronto and Rzeszów, 2010, ISBN 978-0-921724-59-9
- Ruchy Browna, Częstochowa, 2011
- Smena's Memory. Collected Poems, London: Off_Press, 2011. ISBN 978-0-9563946-8-2
- Finite Formulae and Theories of Chance, Arc Publications 2014, ISBN 978-1908376-91-6 (shortlisted for the 2015 Griffin Poetry Prize
- Czasy zespolone, Wydawnictwo Eperons-Ostrogi, Krakow 2017, ISBN 9788394647148

Prose

- Notatnik z wyspy, Częstochowa, 2012. ISBN 978-83-89401-40-3
- Swallowing Mercury, Portobello Books, London 2017 ISBN 9781846276071 (shortlisted for Man Booker International Prize, Jan Michalski Prize for Literature, The Warwick Prize for Women in Translation
- Accommodations, Transit Books
- Dodatkowa dusza, Wydawnictwo Literackie, ISBN 9788308070987
- Wilcza rzeka, Wydawnictwo W.A.B, ISBN 9788328091122
- Tajni dyrygenci chmur, Wydawnictwo W.A.B

Anthologies

- Scattering the Dark: An Anthology of Polish Women Poets, ed. Karen Kovacik, Buffalo, New York: White Pine Press, 2015. ISBN 978-1935210825

== Awards for books ==
- Longlisted for The Man Booker International Prize;

Swallowing Mercury (Portobello Books, translated by Eliza Marciniak);

- Shortlisted for The National Translation Award, Swallowing Mercury, trans. by Eliza Marciniak;
- Shortlisted for The Griffin Poetry Prize in Canada, Finite Formulae and Theories of Chance (Arc Publications, translated by Marek Kazmierski);
- Shortlisted for The Warwick Prize for Women in Translation in the United

Kingdom, Swallowing Mercury;

- Shortlisted for The Michalski Prize in Switzerland, Swallowing Mercury;
- Shortlisted for The Nike Award in Poland, Guguły;
- Shortlisted for The Gdynia Award in Poland, Guguły;
- Shortlisted for The Prix Pierre-François Caillé in France, Les Fruits encore

verts (the Editions Intervalles, translated by Nathalie Le Marchand):

- Award of the City Czestochowa in Poland in the fields of culture.
