= Jadwiga Wiśniewska =

Polish politician (born 1963)

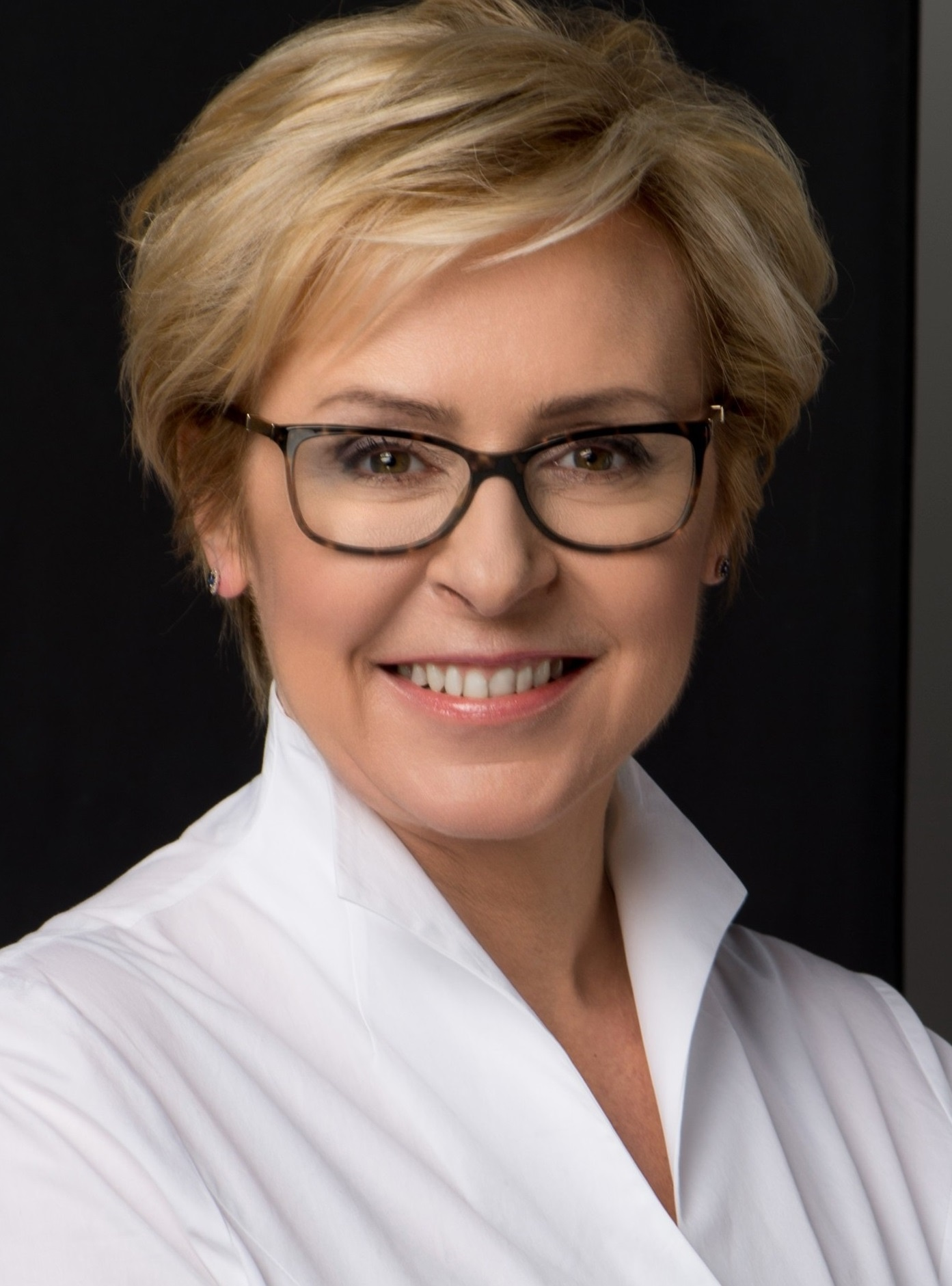

Member of European Parliament
- Incumbent
- Assumed office 2014

Member of Sejm
- In office 2005–2014

Personal details
- Born: 2 July 1963 (age 63) Myszków
- Party: Law and Justice
- Children: 1 (daughter)
- Education: Jan Długosz University
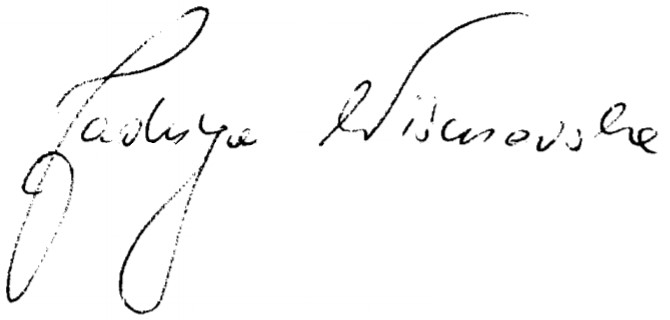
- Signature

Jadwiga Maria Wiśniewska (born 2 July 1963 in Myszków) is a Polish politician and teacher.

== Biography ==
She graduated from the Higher Pedagogical School in Częstochowa. For many years she worked as a teacher and then headmaster of a primary school in Gniazdów.

From 2002 she was a member of the council of Myszków County. In parliamentary election in 2005 she was elected to Sejm from the Law and Justice list. She received re-election in 2007 and 2011.

She became the vice-chairperson of the Law and Justice in Częstochowa district and a member of the party's political council. In the elections to the European Parliament in 2014, she was elected from the Law and Justice list from Silesian Voivodeship. In the European Parliament elections in 2019, she successfully applied for re-election, obtaining the third best result in the country (409 373 votes).
