= Rosochacz =

- Part of a town
- Location within Poland
- Coordinates: 50°38′N 19°10′E
- Country: Poland
- Voivodeship: Silesian
- County: Myszków
- Gmina: Koziegłowy

Rosochacz – a part of the town of Koziegłowy, formerly a village in Poland placed in the Voivodeship of Silesia, in the Myszków district in the Koziegłowy Gmina.

On January 1, a new cluster of Wylągi was created from part of Rosochacz.

The Rosochacz cluster was abolished on January 1, 1950 in connection with granting the Koziegłowy gmina the status of a city, which made Rosochacz an urban area and an integral part of Koziegłowy.
