= Oczko =

- Village
- Location within Poland
- Coordinates: 50°37′6″N 19°14′31″E
- Country: Poland
- Voivodeship: Silesian
- County: Myszków
- Gmina: Koziegłowy

Oczko [ˈɔt͡ʂkɔ] is a village in the administrative district of Gmina Koziegłowy, within Myszków County, Silesian Voivodeship, in southern Poland.
