= Gmina Poraj =

Gmina Poraj Poraj Commune
- Gmina
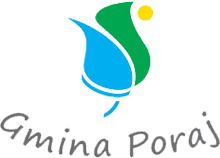
- Coat of arms
- Interactive map of Gmina Poraj
- Coordinates (Poraj): 50°40′44″N 19°12′58″E
- Country: Poland
- Voivodeship: Silesian
- County: Myszków
- Seat: Poraj

Area
  - Total: 58.53 km^{2} (22.60 sq mi)

Population (2019-06-30)
  - Total: 10,902
  - Density: 186.3/km^{2} (482.4/sq mi)
- Website: http://www.ugporaj.pl

Gmina Poraj is a rural gmina (administrative district) in Myszków County, Silesian Voivodeship, in southern Poland. Its seat is the village of Poraj, which lies approximately 13 kilometres (8 mi) north-west of Myszków and 50 km (31 mi) north of the regional capital Katowice.

The gmina covers an area of 58.53 square kilometres (22.6 sq mi), and as of 2019 its total population is 10,902.

== Villages ==
Gmina Poraj contains the villages and settlements of Choroń, Choroń-Baranowizna, Choroń-Rajczykowizna, Dębowiec, Gęzyn, Jastrząb, Kuźnica Stara, Kuźnica-Folwark, Masłońskie, Poraj, Pustkowie Gęzyńskie and Żarki-Letnisko.

== Neighbouring gminas ==
Gmina Poraj is bordered by the town of Myszków and by the gminas of Kamienica Polska, Koziegłowy, Olsztyn and Żarki.

== Twin towns – sister cities ==
Gmina Poraj is twinned with:

- Belá-Dulice, Slovakia
- Pohořelice, Czech Republic
- Vilnius District Municipality, Lithuania
