= Żywiec Zdrój =

Polish beverage company

Żywiec Zdrój S.A.
- Type: Subsidiary
- Industry: Beverage manufacturing
- Founded: 1992; 34 years ago
- Headquarters: Cięcina, Poland
- Owner: Frédéric Guichard
- Number of employees: 600
- Parent: Danone
- Website: www.zywiec-zdroj.pl

Żywiec Zdrój (Poland)

Żywiec Zdrój S.A. is a bottled water and drinks joint-stock company owned by Danone and based in Cięcina, Poland. Its main product is bottled water, drawn from the water source coming from the Abrahamów mountain ridge in Żywiec Landscape Park. It was established in 1992.

== History ==
The company was founded by brothers Mieczysław and Stanisław Bizoń in late 1992. After obtaining the necessary permits and completing the machine Park, the first bottle of still spring water came off the production line on April 23, 1993. In the same year, Żywiec Zdrój also started the production of carbonated water. The period of the greatest changes and the most dynamic development was from 1994 to 2001. In July 1998, a second production plant was opened in Strzeczno, and two years later the company started production of carbonated water in the factory in Mirosławiec. Later in 2001, the company was transformed into a joint-stock company and joined the Danone group of companies. In 2005, another factory was opened in Jeleśnia. In the same year, Żywiec Zdrój Smako-Łyk, which is the first drink in the company's offer, also entered the market. Then in 2010 Żywiec Zdrój opened its fourth factory in Rzeniszów.

At first, the figure from the label Żywiec Zdrój referred to the image of Emperor Franz Joseph, who was strongly associated with the Żywiec region (this was to emphasize the origin of water from these areas). In the following years, his share of the logo dwindled in favor of The Hill of Abraham, until he finally disappeared from it altogether.

== Products ==
- Żywiec Zdrój Still Water
- Żywiec Zdrój Carbonated Water (Highly carbonated or slightly carbonated)
- Żywiec Zdrój in a glass bottle (Still or Carbonated)
- Żywiec Zdrój Kids (Głupawka, Maskotka lub Zdrojek)
- Żywiec Zdrój Fruit Flavoured (Peach, Lime, Raspberry or Strawberry)
- Żywiec Zdrój with a hint of fruit (Orange and Mango, lime and Mint, Strawberry, Lemon, Apple, Cherry, Raspberry, Lime, Strawberry or Peach)
- Żywiec Zdrój Ice Tea (Green tea and Pear, Green tea and Mint, Black tea lemon and Lime or Black tea peach and Orange)
- Żywiec Zdrój Lemonade (Lemon, Lime or Watermelon)
- Żywiec Zdrój Juicy (Strawberry or Apple)
- Żywiec Zdrój Essence (Lemon and Basil, Mandarin and Lemongrass OR Cucumber and Lime)
- Żywiec Zdrój Sparkles (Green Lime, Garden Berries or Virgin mint)
- Żywiec Zdrój Carbonated Water (Lemon/Orange)
