= Antolka, Silesian Voivodeship =

Antolka
- Village
- Location within Poland
- Coordinates: 50°37′48″N 19°31′45″E
- Country: Poland
- Voivodeship: Silesian
- County: Myszków
- Gmina: Niegowa

Antolka [anˈtɔlka] is a village in the administrative district of Gmina Niegowa, within Myszków County, Silesian Voivodeship, in southern Poland.
