= Lgota-Nadwarcie =

- Village
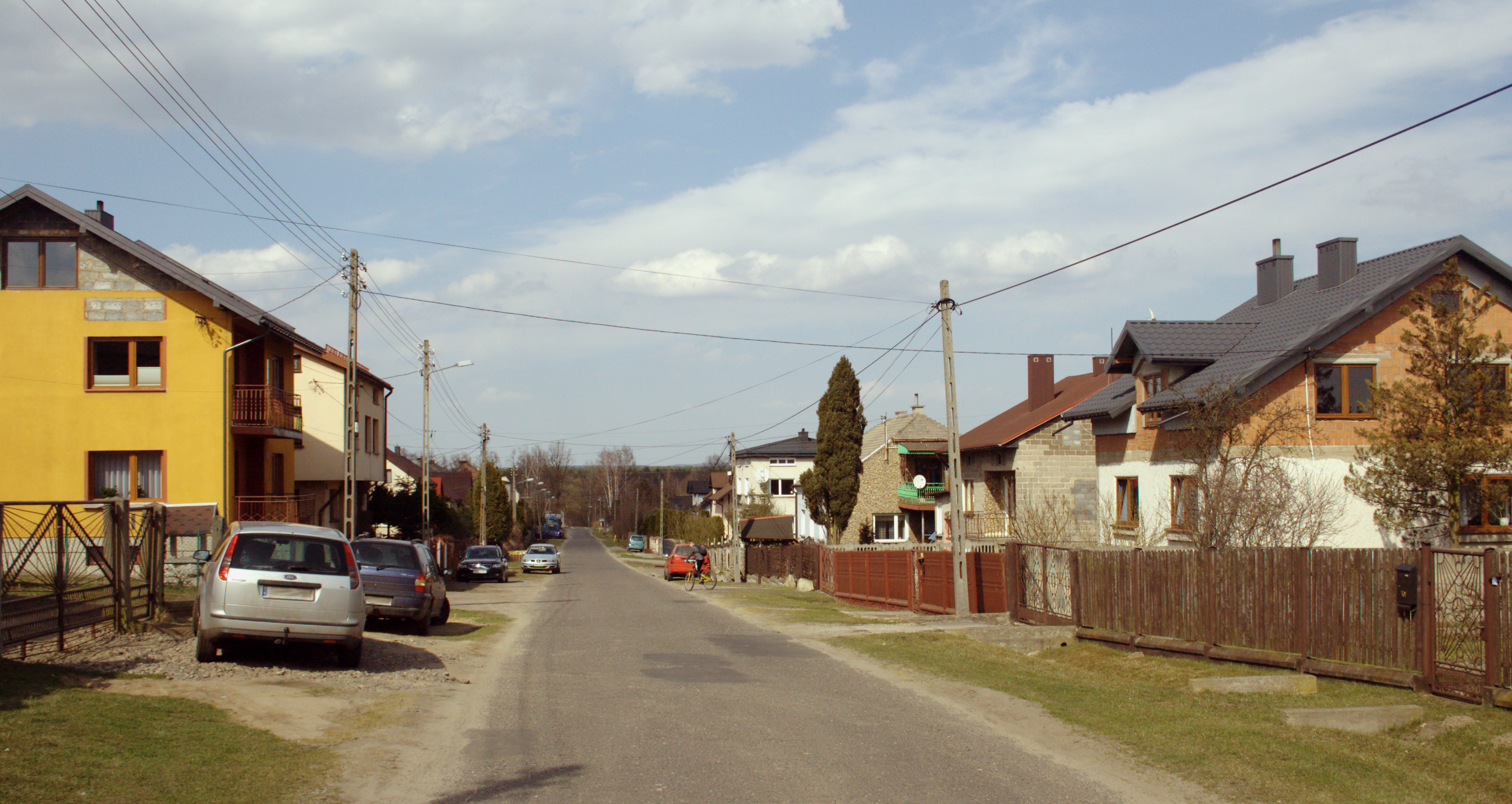

- Location within Poland
- Coordinates: 50°36′24″N 19°15′4″E
- Country: Poland
- Voivodeship: Silesian
- County: Myszków
- Gmina: Koziegłowy

Lgota-Nadwarcie [ˈlɡɔta nadˈvart͡ɕɛ] is a village in the administrative district of Gmina Koziegłowy, within Myszków County, Silesian Voivodeship, in southern Poland.
