= Pustkowie Gęzyńskie =

- Settlement
- Location within Poland
- Coordinates: 50°37′51″N 19°11′27″E
- Country: Poland
- Voivodeship: Silesian
- County: Myszków
- Gmina: Poraj

Pustkowie Gęzyńskie [pustˈkɔvjɛ ɡɛ̃ˈzɨɲskʲɛ] is a settlement in the administrative district of Gmina Poraj, within Myszków County, Silesian Voivodeship, in southern Poland.
