= Trzebniów =

- Village
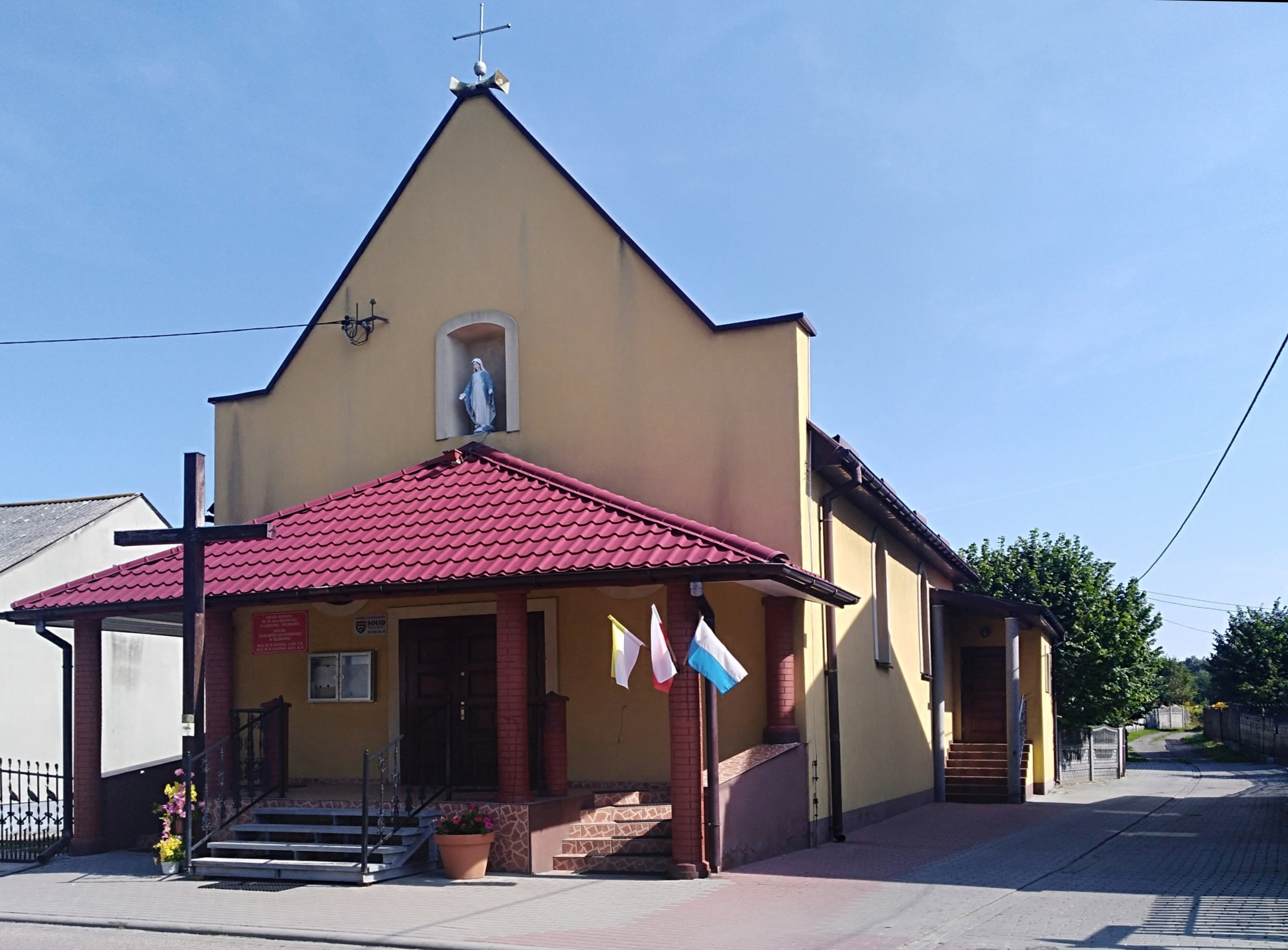
- Catholic church

- Location within Poland
- Coordinates: 50°40′N 19°26′E
- Country: Poland
- Voivodeship: Silesian
- County: Myszków
- Gmina: Niegowa

Trzebniów [ˈtʂɛbɲuf] is a village in the administrative district of Gmina Niegowa, within Myszków County, Silesian Voivodeship, in southern Poland.
