= Miłość, Silesian Voivodeship =

Miłość
- Village
- Location within Poland
- Coordinates: 50°36′N 19°12′E
- Country: Poland
- Voivodeship: Silesian
- County: Myszków
- Gmina: Koziegłowy

Miłość [ˈmiwɔɕt͡ɕ] is a village in the administrative district of Gmina Koziegłowy, within Myszków County, Silesian Voivodeship, in southern Poland.

In Polish the word Miłość mean love.
