= Jastrząb, Silesian Voivodeship =

Jastrząb
- Village
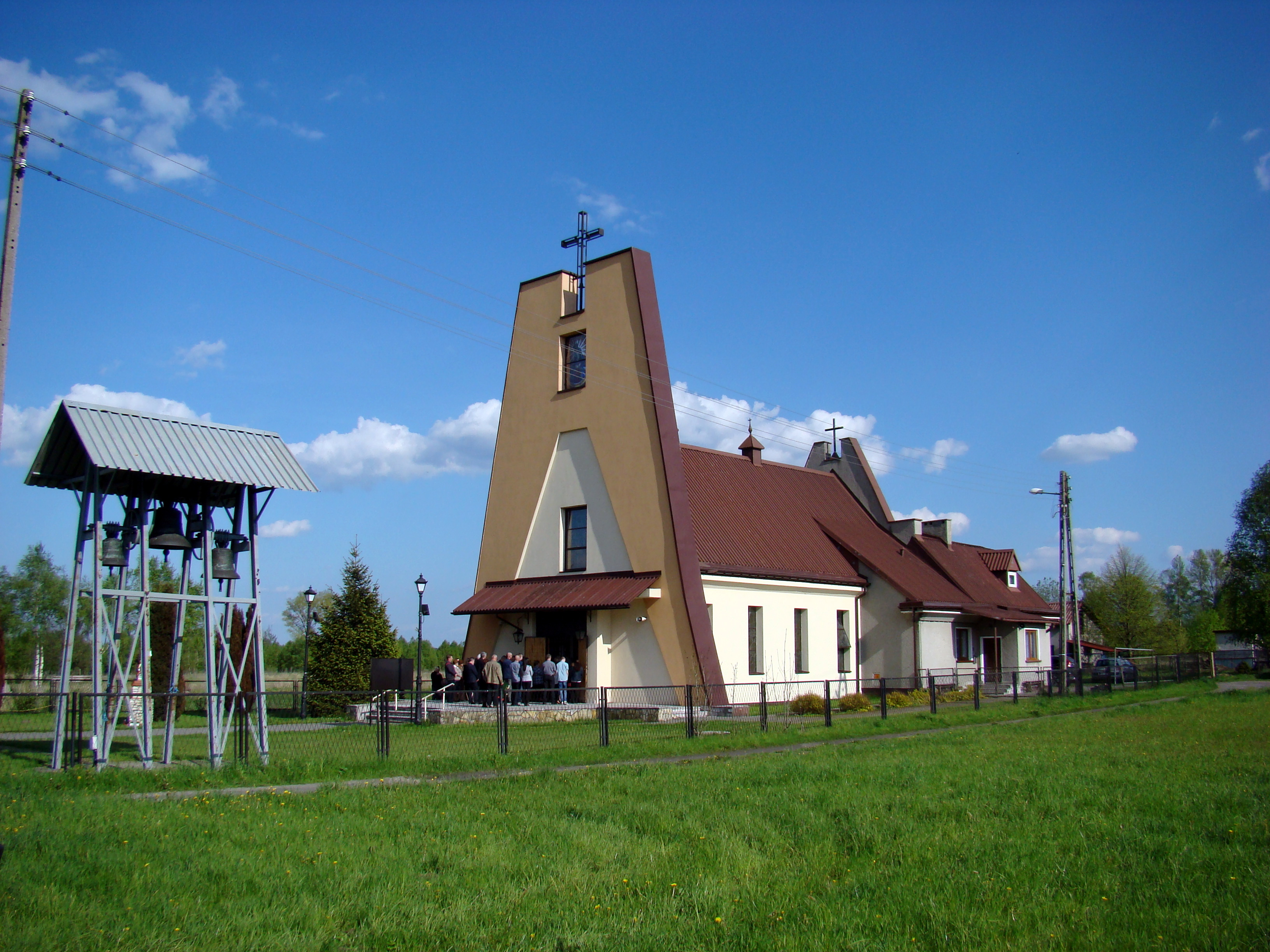
- Church of Our Lady of Mercy

- Location within Poland
- Coordinates: 50°40′N 19°11′E
- Country: Poland
- Voivodeship: Silesian
- County: Myszków
- Gmina: Poraj

Jastrząb [ˈjastʂɔmp] is a village in the administrative district of Gmina Poraj, within Myszków County, Silesian Voivodeship, in southern Poland.
