= Zagórze, Myszków County =

Zagórze
- Village
- Location within Poland
- Coordinates: 50°37′N 19°36′E
- Country: Poland
- Voivodeship: Silesian
- County: Myszków
- Gmina: Niegowa
- Population: 110

Zagórze [zaˈɡuʐɛ] is a village in the administrative district of Gmina Niegowa, within Myszków County, Silesian Voivodeship, in southern Poland.
