= Stara Huta, Silesian Voivodeship =

Village in Silesia

Stara Huta
- Village
- Location within Poland
- Coordinates: 50°32′35″N 19°15′28″E
- Country: Poland
- Voivodeship: Silesian
- County: Myszków
- Gmina: Koziegłowy

Stara Huta [ˈstara ˈxuta] is a village in the administrative district of Gmina Koziegłowy, within Myszków County, Silesian Voivodeship, in southern Poland.
