= Gorzków Nowy =

- Village
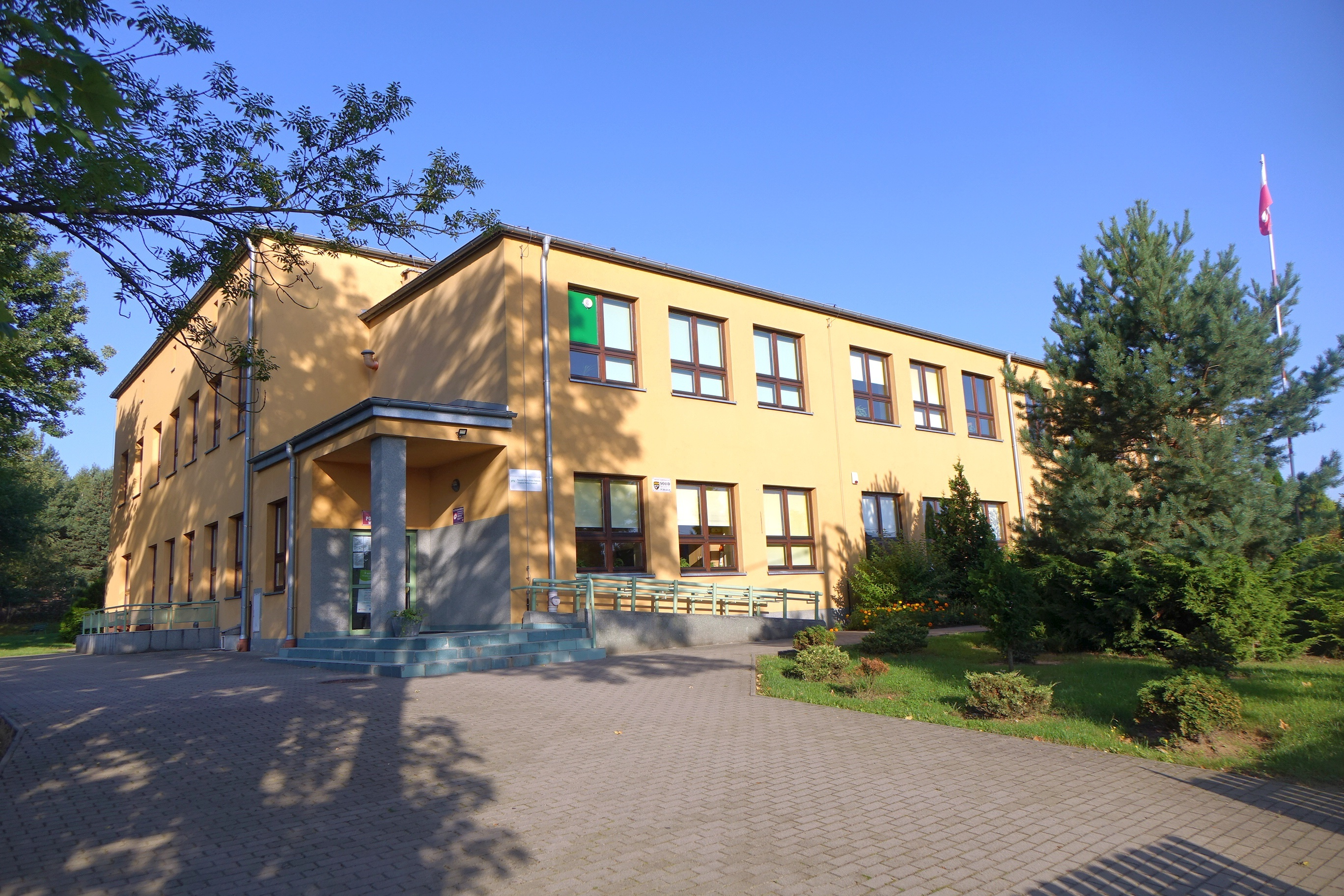
- School

- Location within Poland
- Coordinates: 50°40′43″N 19°28′14″E
- Country: Poland
- Voivodeship: Silesian
- County: Myszków
- Gmina: Niegowa
- Population: 320

Gorzków Nowy [ˈɡɔʂkuf ˈnɔvɨ] is a village in the administrative district of Gmina Niegowa, within Myszków County, Silesian Voivodeship, in southern Poland.
