= Żarki-Letnisko =

- Village
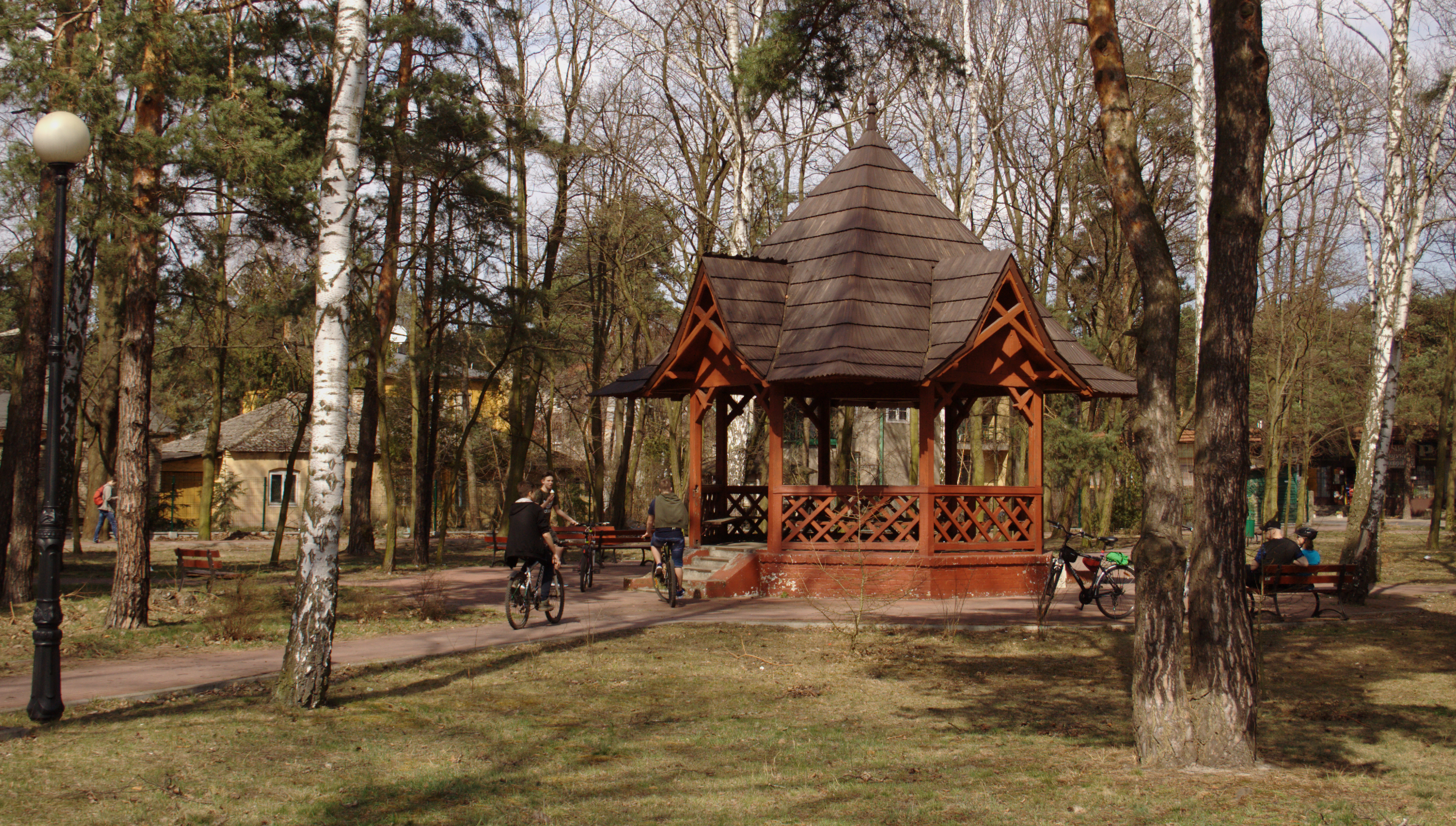

- Location within Poland
- Coordinates: 50°37′N 19°16′E
- Country: Poland
- Voivodeship: Silesian
- County: Myszków
- Gmina: Poraj
- Population: 1,980
- Website: https://www.zarkiletnisko.pl

Żarki-Letnisko [ˈʐarki lɛtˈniskɔ] is a village in the administrative district of Gmina Poraj, within Myszków County, Silesian Voivodeship, in southern Poland.
