= Ludwinów, Myszków County =

Ludwinów
- Village
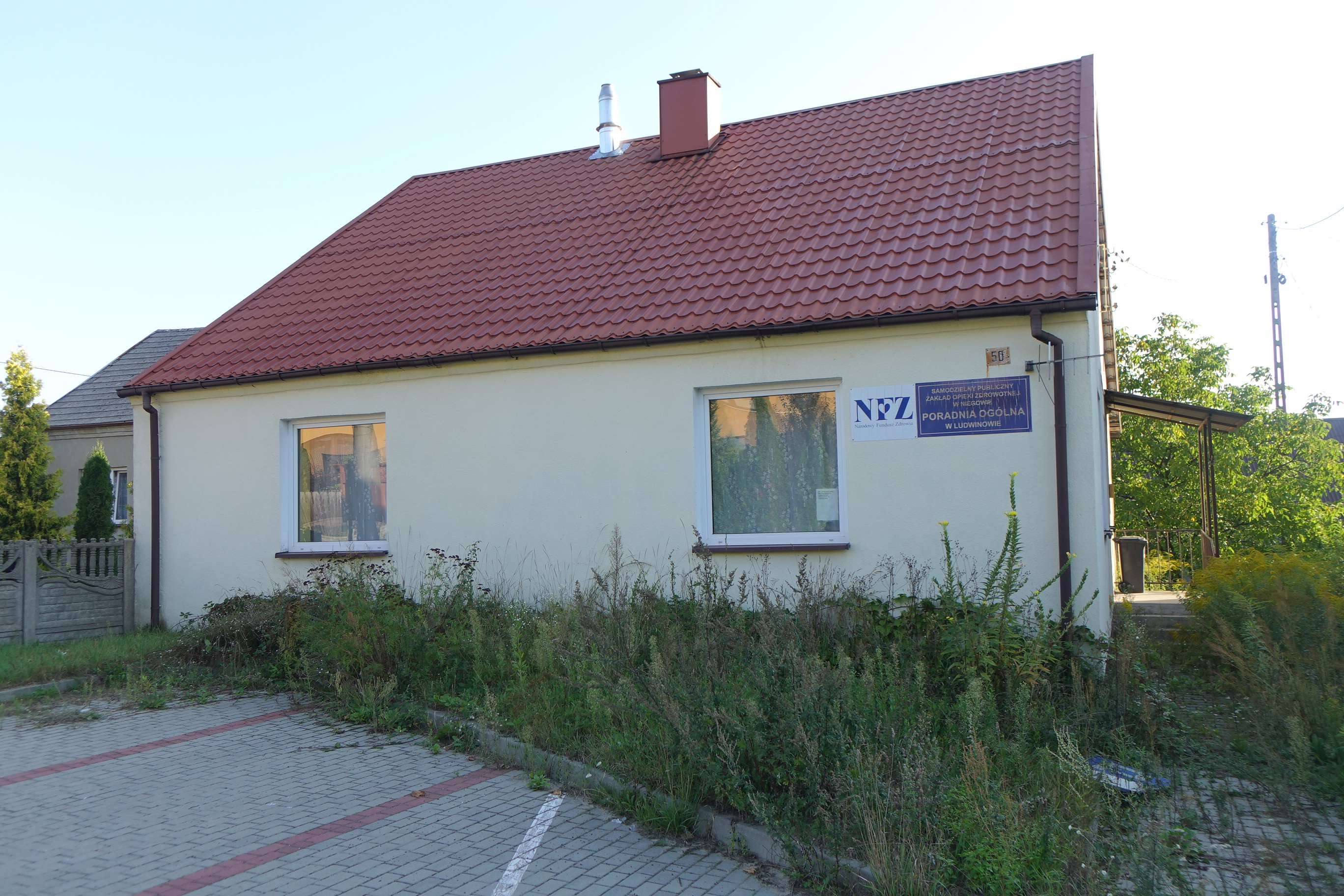

- Location within Poland
- Coordinates: 50°40′39″N 19°26′37″E
- Country: Poland
- Voivodeship: Silesian
- County: Myszków
- Gmina: Niegowa

Ludwinów (Polish pronunciation: [ludˈvinuf]) is a village in the administrative district of Gmina Niegowa, within Myszków County, Silesian Voivodeship, in southern Poland.
