= Sokolniki, Silesian Voivodeship =

Sokolniki
- Village
- Location within Poland
- Coordinates: 50°38′21″N 19°35′55″E
- Country: Poland
- Voivodeship: Silesian
- County: Myszków
- Gmina: Niegowa
- Population: 980

Sokolniki [sɔkɔlˈɲikʲi] is a village in the administrative district of Gmina Niegowa, within Myszków County, Silesian Voivodeship, in southern Poland.
