= Gliniana Góra =

- Village
- Location within Poland
- Coordinates: 50°35′17″N 19°13′31″E
- Country: Poland
- Voivodeship: Silesian
- County: Myszków
- Gmina: Koziegłowy

Gliniana Góra [ɡliˈɲana ˈɡura] is a village in the administrative district of Gmina Koziegłowy, within Myszków County, Silesian Voivodeship, in southern Poland.
