= Cynków, Silesian Voivodeship =

Cynków
- Village
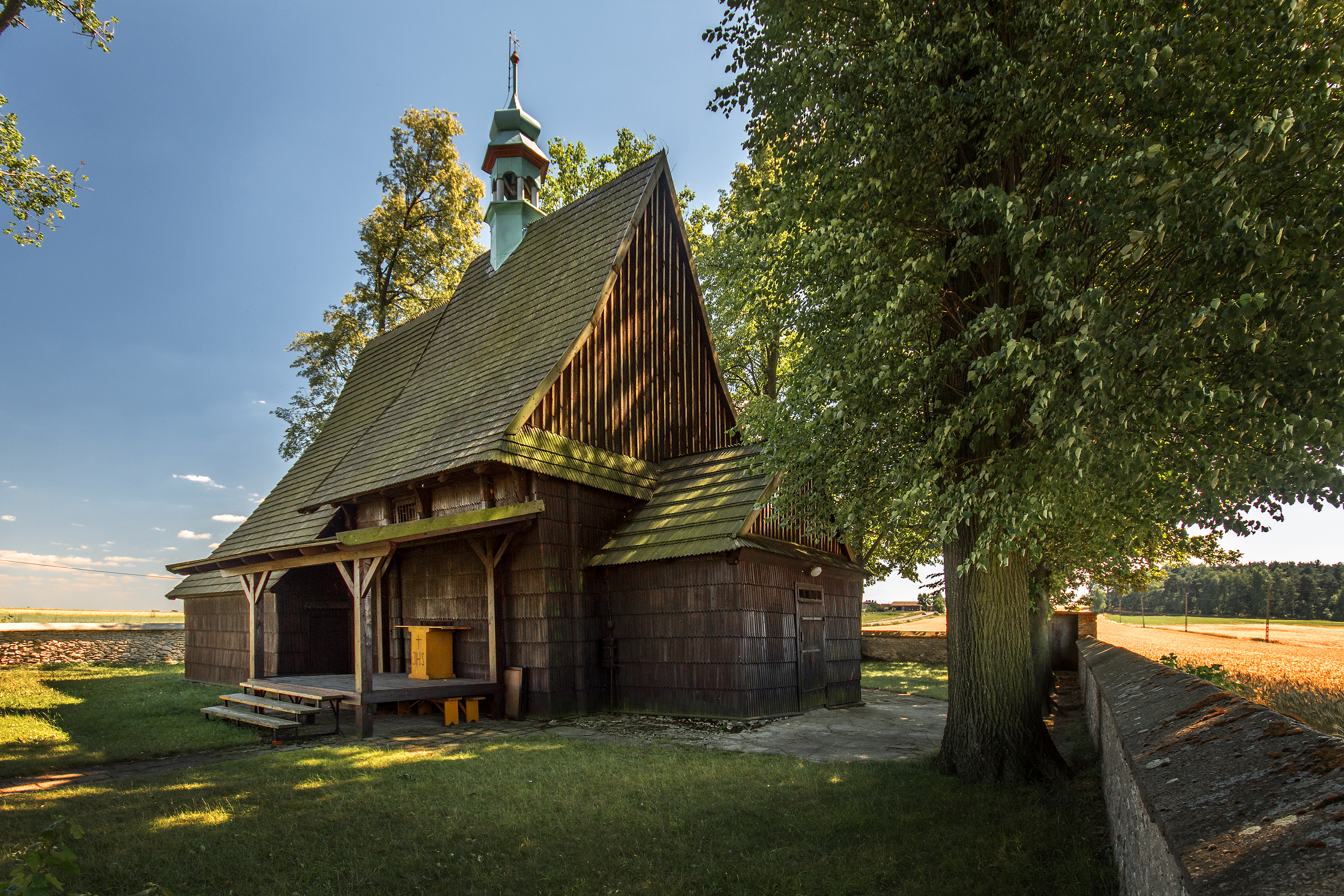
- Church of Saint Lawrence

- Location within Poland
- Coordinates: 50°33′41″N 19°7′9″E
- Country: Poland
- Voivodeship: Silesian
- County: Myszków
- Gmina: Koziegłowy

Cynków [ˈt͡sɨnkuf] is a village in the administrative district of Gmina Koziegłowy, within Myszków County, Silesian Voivodeship, in southern Poland.
