= Mzurów =

- Village
- Location within Poland
- Coordinates: 50°39′42″N 19°30′24″E
- Country: Poland
- Voivodeship: Silesian
- County: Myszków
- Gmina: Niegowa

Mzurów [ˈmzuruf] is a village in the administrative district of Gmina Niegowa, within Myszków County, Silesian Voivodeship, in southern Poland.
