= Kuźnica Stara =

- Village
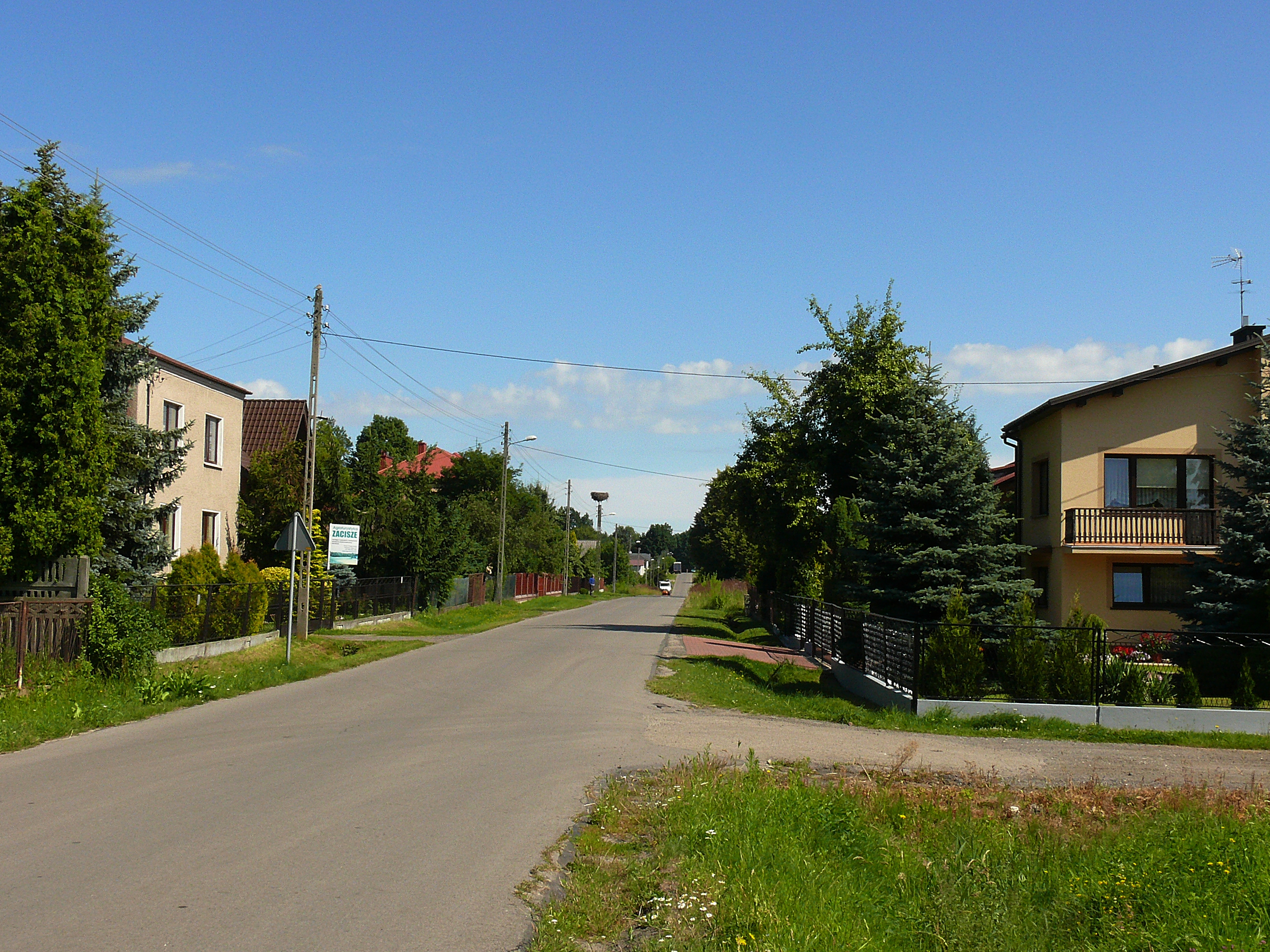

- Location within Poland
- Coordinates: 50°39′N 19°13′E
- Country: Poland
- Voivodeship: Silesian
- County: Myszków
- Gmina: Poraj
- Population: 150

Kuźnica Stara (Polish pronunciation: [kuʑˈɲit͡sa ˈstara]) is a village in the administrative district of Gmina Poraj, within Myszków County, Silesian Voivodeship, in southern Poland.
