= Choroń =

- Village
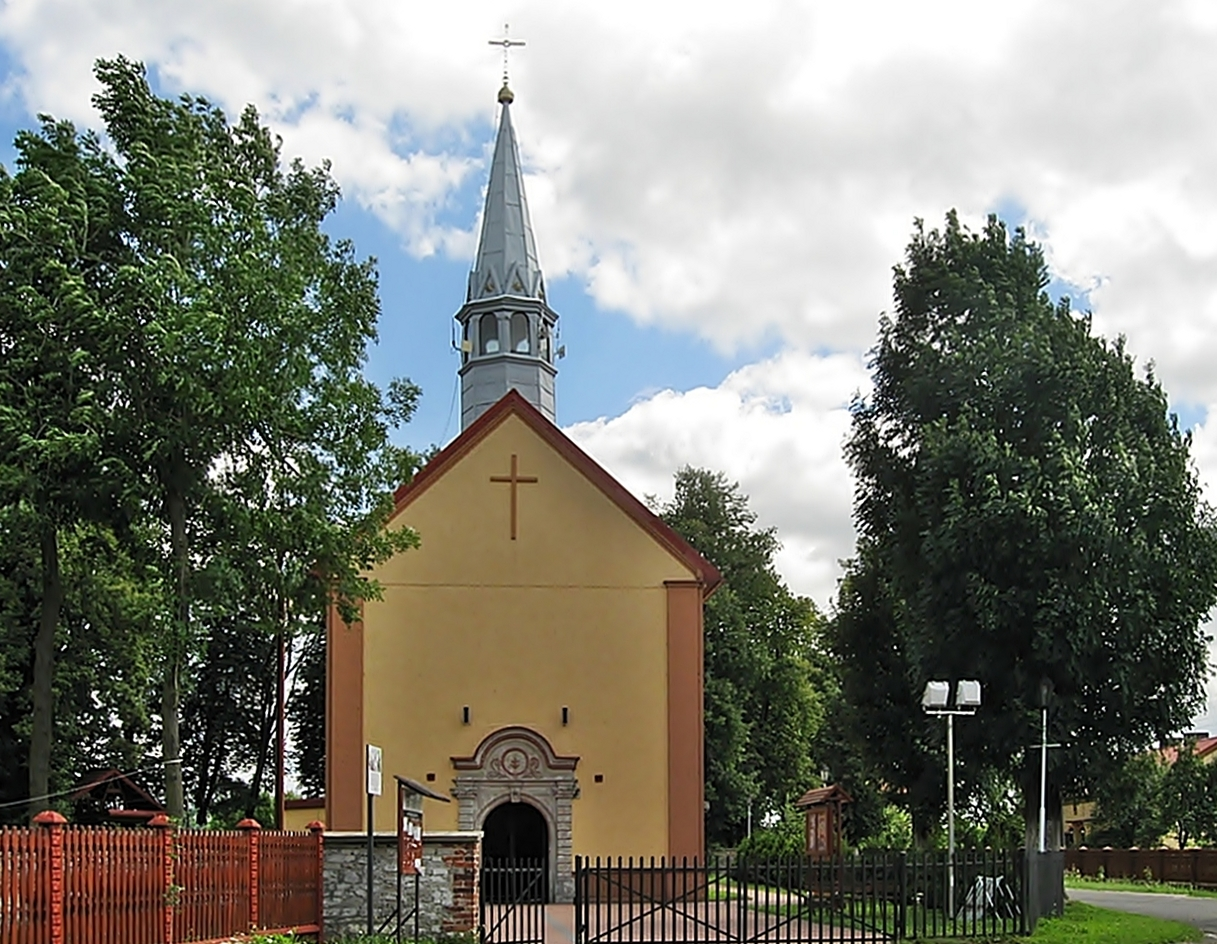
- Church of Saint John the Baptist

- Location within Poland
- Coordinates: 50°41′N 19°16′E
- Country: Poland
- Voivodeship: Silesian
- County: Myszków
- Gmina: Poraj

Population
  - Total: 1,438
- Website: http://www.choron.lua.pl

Choroń [ˈxɔrɔɲ] is a village in the administrative district of Gmina Poraj, within Myszków County, Silesian Voivodeship, in southern Poland.
