= Pińczyce =

Village in Silesian Voivodeship, Poland

- Village
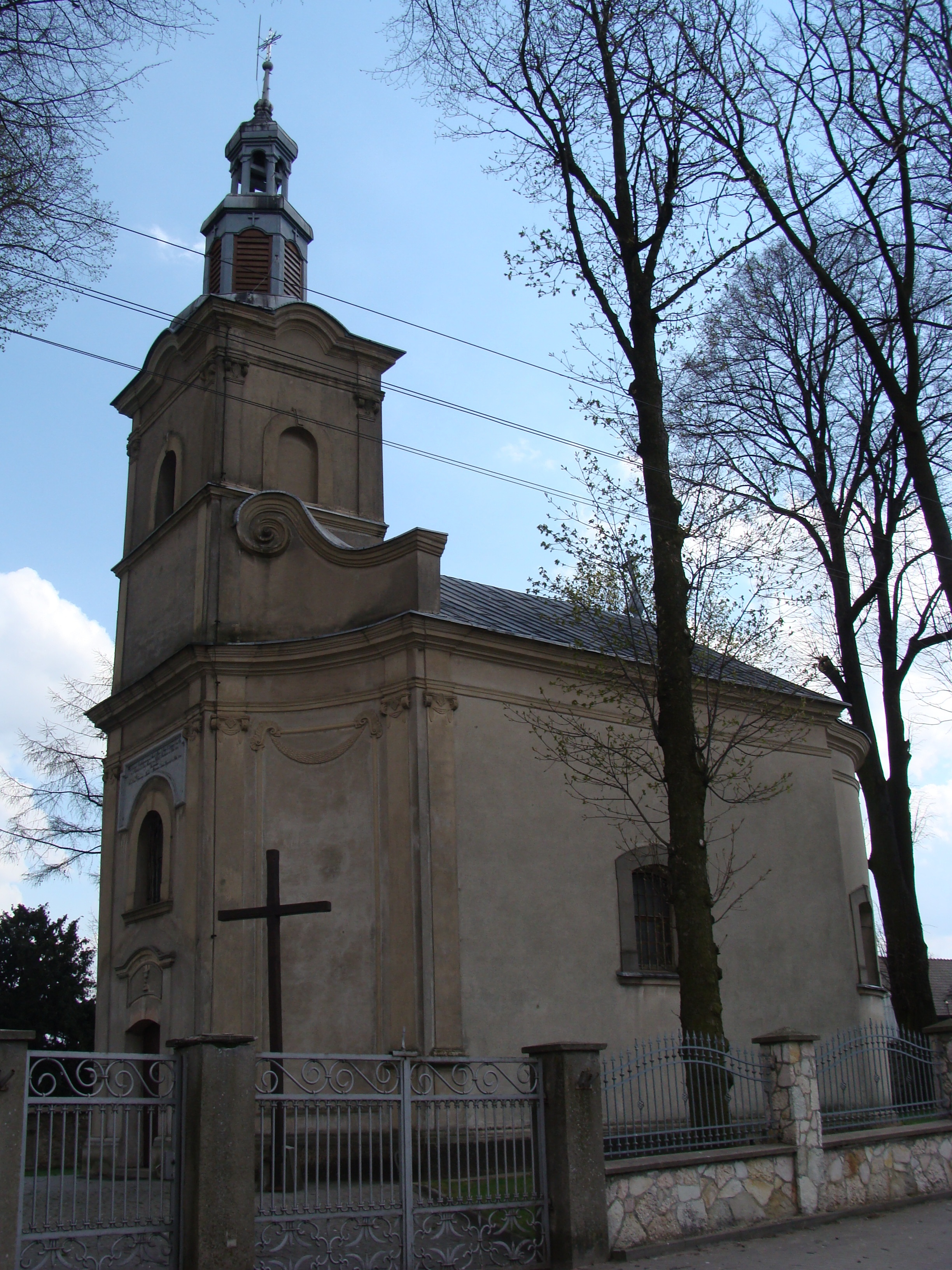
- Saint Michael Archangel church in Pińczyce

- Location within Poland
- Coordinates: 50°33′N 19°15′E
- Country: Poland
- Voivodeship: Silesian Voivodeship
- County: Myszków
- Gmina: Koziegłowy

Population
  - Total: 1,000
- Time zone: UTC+1 (CET)
  - Summer (DST): UTC+2 (CEST)
- Vehicle registration: SMY

Pińczyce [piɲˈt͡ʂɨt͡sɛ] is a village in the administrative district of Gmina Koziegłowy, within Myszków County, Silesian Voivodeship, in southern Poland.

== History ==
During the German invasion of Poland which started World War II, on September 3, 1939, German troops carried out a massacre of 20 Poles (see Nazi crimes against the Polish nation).
