= Siedlec Duży =

- Village
- Location within Poland
- Coordinates: 50°38′N 19°7′E
- Country: Poland
- Voivodeship: Silesian
- County: Myszków
- Gmina: Koziegłowy
- Population: 860

Siedlec Duży [ˈɕɛdlɛt͡s ˈduʐɨ] is a village in the administrative district of Gmina Koziegłowy, within Myszków County, Silesian Voivodeship, in southern Poland.
