= Nowa Kuźnica, Myszków County =

Nowa Kuźnica
- Village
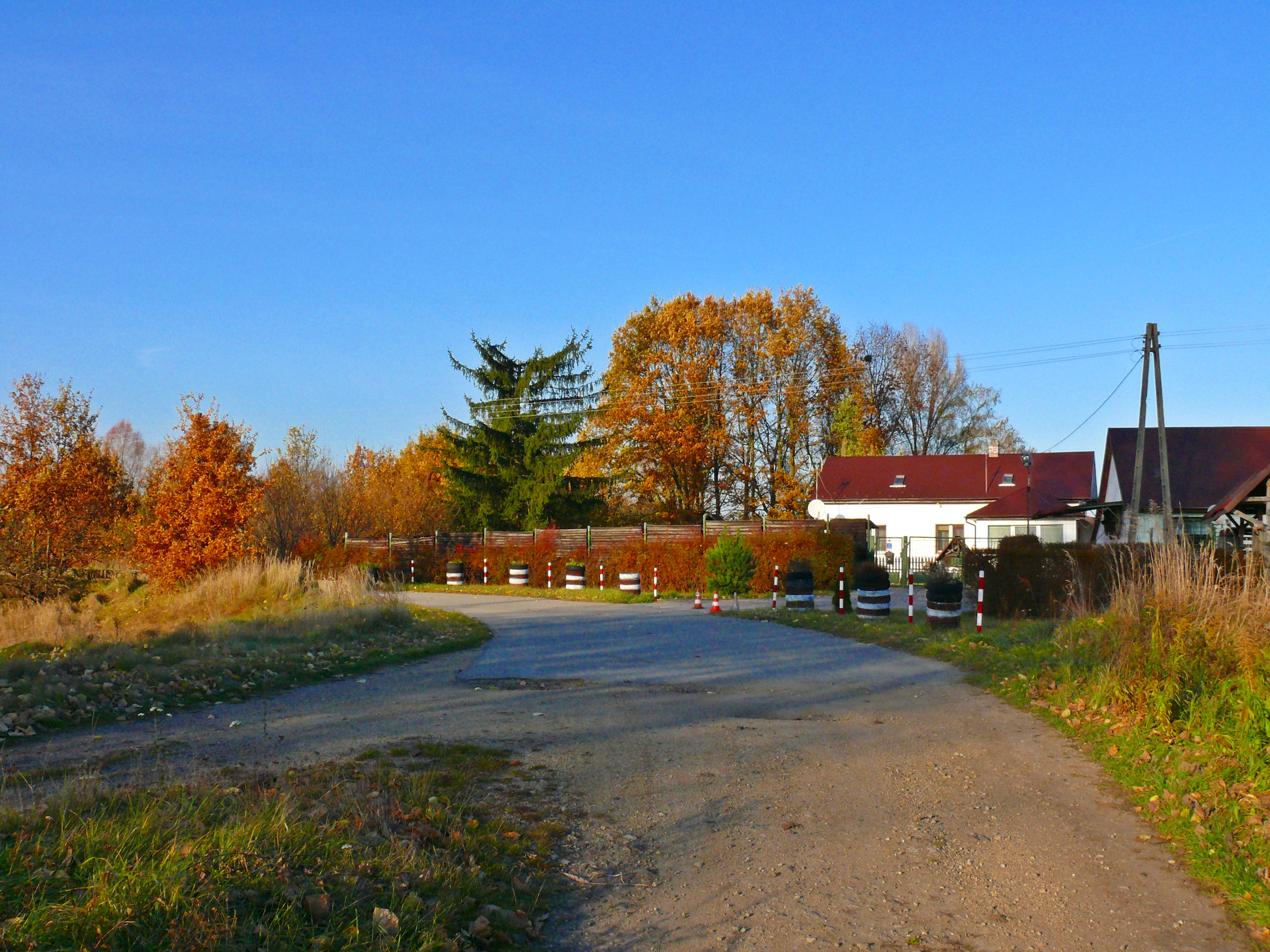

- Location within Poland
- Coordinates: 50°37′14″N 19°13′27″E
- Country: Poland
- Voivodeship: Silesian
- County: Myszków
- Gmina: Koziegłowy

Nowa Kuźnica (Polish pronunciation: [ˈnɔva kuʑˈɲit͡sa]) is a village in the administrative district of Gmina Koziegłowy, within Myszków County, Silesian Voivodeship, in southern Poland.
