= Brzeziny, Myszków County =

Brzeziny
- Village
- Location within Poland
- Coordinates: 50°39′43″N 19°27′53″E
- Country: Poland
- Voivodeship: Silesian
- County: Myszków
- Gmina: Niegowa

Brzeziny [bʐɛˈʑinɨ] is a village in the administrative district of Gmina Niegowa, within Myszków County, Silesian Voivodeship, in southern Poland.
