= Mzyki, Myszków County =

Mzyki
- Village
- Location within Poland
- Coordinates: 50°36′50″N 19°5′32″E
- Country: Poland
- Voivodeship: Silesian
- County: Myszków
- Gmina: Koziegłowy

Mzyki [ˈmzɨki] is a village in the administrative district of Gmina Koziegłowy, within Myszków County, Silesian Voivodeship, in southern Poland.
