= Dąbrowno, Silesian Voivodeship =

Dąbrowno
- Village
- Location within Poland
- Coordinates: 50°40′19″N 19°32′28″E
- Country: Poland
- Voivodeship: Silesian
- County: Myszków
- Gmina: Niegowa

Dąbrowno [dɔmˈbrɔvnɔ] is a village in the administrative district of Gmina Niegowa, within Myszków County, Silesian Voivodeship, in southern Poland.
