= Dębowiec, Myszków County =

Dębowiec
- Village
- Location within Poland
- Coordinates: 50°42′0″N 19°14′31″E
- Country: Poland
- Voivodeship: Silesian
- County: Myszków
- Gmina: Poraj
- Population: 200

Dębowiec [dɛmˈbɔvjɛt͡s] is a village in the administrative district of Gmina Poraj, within Myszków County, Silesian Voivodeship, in southern Poland.
