= Zabijak, Silesian Voivodeship =

Zabijak
- Village
- Location within Poland
- Coordinates: 50°32′N 19°12′E
- Country: Poland
- Voivodeship: Silesian
- County: Myszków
- Gmina: Koziegłowy

Zabijak [zaˈbijak] is a village in the administrative district of Gmina Koziegłowy, within Myszków County, Silesian Voivodeship, in southern Poland.
