= Postęp, Silesian Voivodeship =

Postęp
- Village
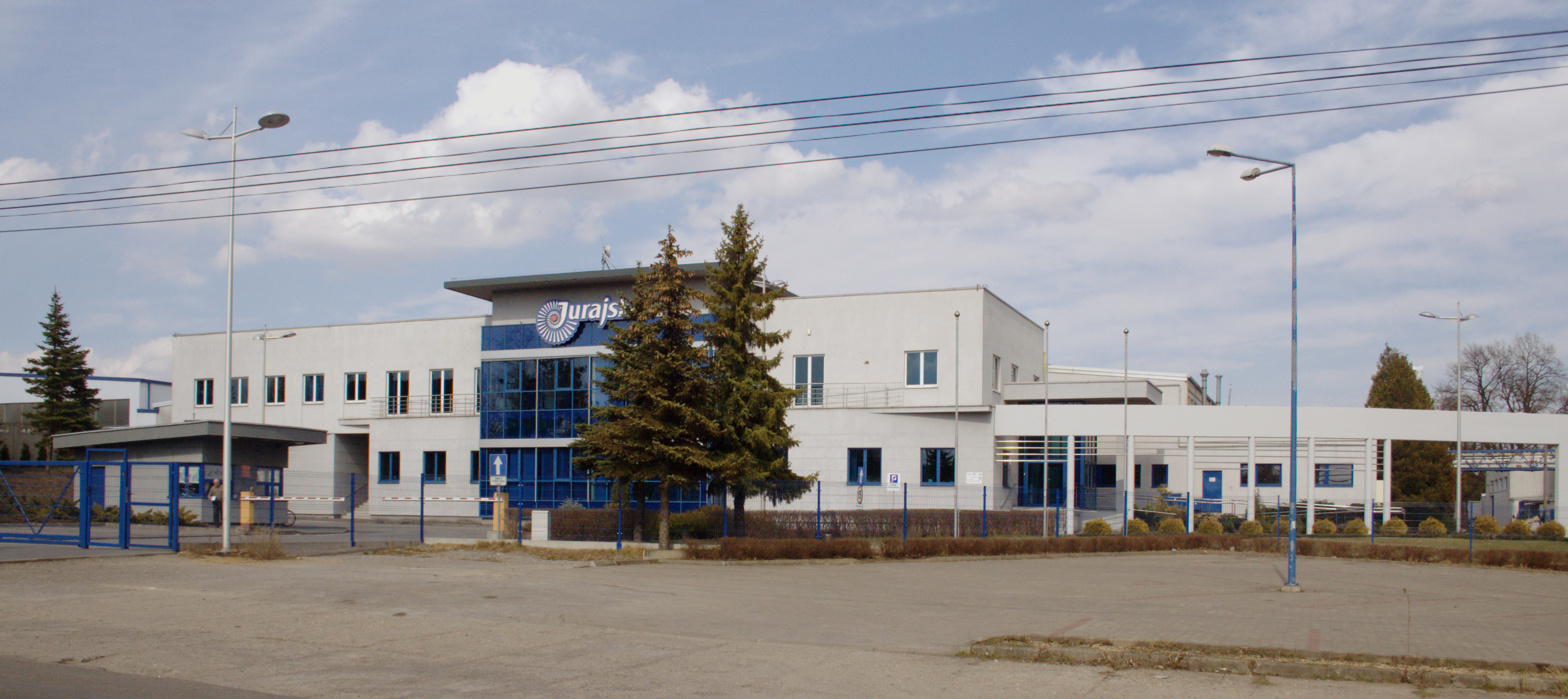

- Location within Poland
- Coordinates: 50°36′N 19°16′E
- Country: Poland
- Voivodeship: Silesian
- County: Myszków
- Gmina: Koziegłowy

Postęp [ˈpɔstɛmp] is a village in the administrative district of Gmina Koziegłowy, within Myszków County, Silesian Voivodeship, in southern Poland.
