= Markowice, Silesian Voivodeship =

Markowice
- Village
- Location within Poland
- Coordinates: 50°33′37″N 19°10′13″E
- Country: Poland
- Voivodeship: Silesian
- County: Myszków
- Gmina: Koziegłowy

Markowice [markɔˈvit͡sɛ] is a village in the administrative district of Gmina Koziegłowy, within Myszków County, Silesian Voivodeship, in southern Poland.
