= Choroń-Rajczykowizna =

- Settlement
- Location within Poland
- Coordinates: 50°39′48″N 19°16′32″E
- Country: Poland
- Voivodeship: Silesian
- County: Myszków
- Gmina: Poraj

Choroń-Rajczykowizna [ˈxɔrɔɲ rai̯t͡ʂɨkɔˈvizna] is a settlement in the administrative district of Gmina Poraj, within Myszków County, Silesian Voivodeship, in southern Poland.
