= Lgota-Mokrzesz =

- Village
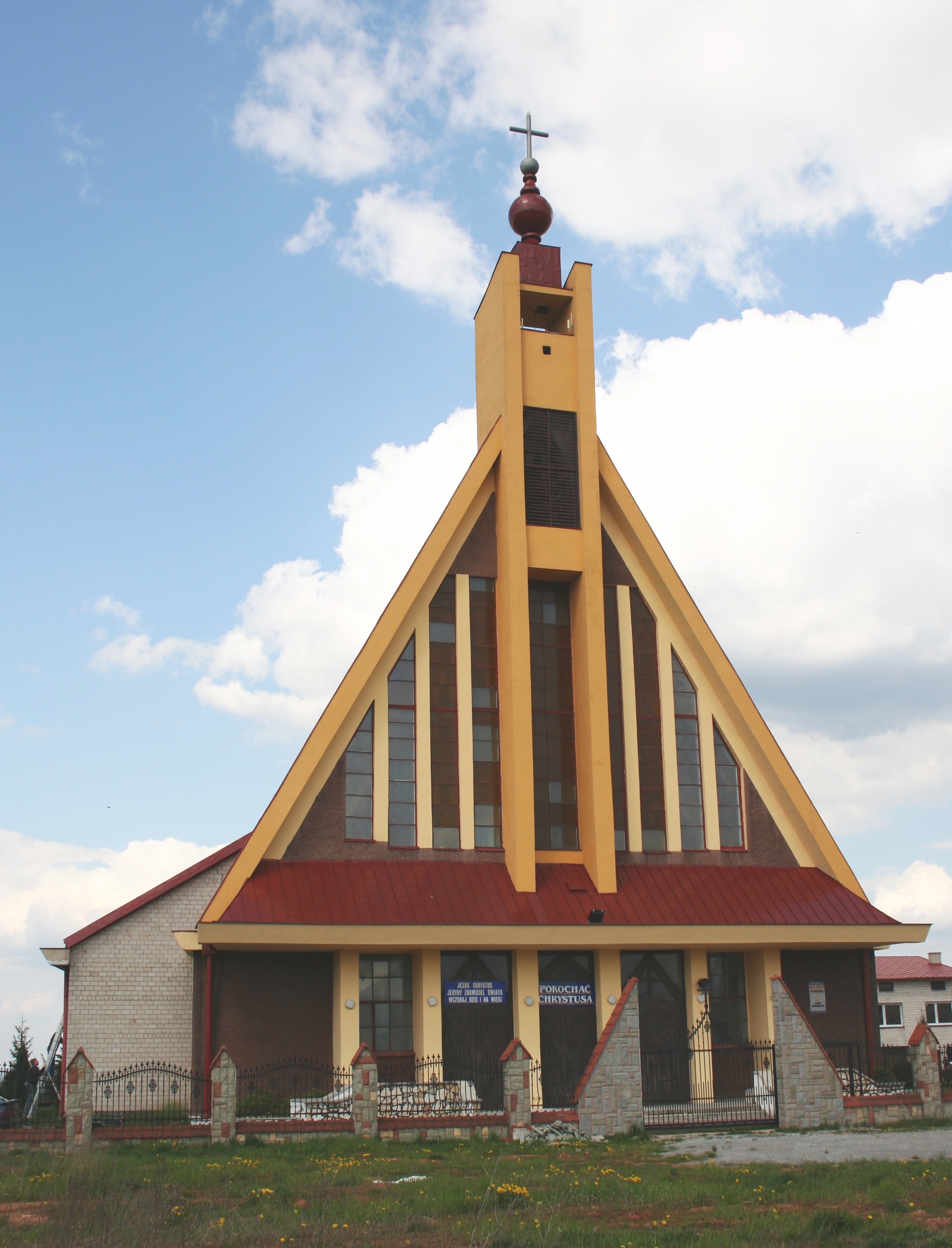
- Catholic church

- Location within Poland
- Coordinates: 50°36′47″N 19°14′13″E
- Country: Poland
- Voivodeship: Silesian
- County: Myszków
- Gmina: Koziegłowy

Lgota-Mokrzesz [ˈlɡɔta ˈmɔkʂɛʂ] is a village in the administrative district of Gmina Koziegłowy, within Myszków County, Silesian Voivodeship, in southern Poland.
