= Kuźnica-Folwark =

- Settlement
- Location within Poland
- Coordinates: 50°37′56″N 19°13′4″E
- Country: Poland
- Voivodeship: Silesian
- County: Myszków
- Gmina: Poraj

Kuźnica-Folwark (Polish pronunciation: [kuʑˈɲit͡sa ˈfɔlvark]) is a settlement in the administrative district of Gmina Poraj, within Myszków County, Silesian Voivodeship, in southern Poland.
