= Bliżyce, Silesian Voivodeship =

Bliżyce
- Village
- Location within Poland
- Coordinates: 50°37′56″N 19°33′25″E
- Country: Poland
- Voivodeship: Silesian
- County: Myszków
- Gmina: Niegowa

Bliżyce [bliˈʐɨt͡sɛ] is a village in the administrative district of Gmina Niegowa, within Myszków County, Silesian Voivodeship, in southern Poland.

== History ==
Village Bliżyce was first mentioned in 1369 as a property which belonged to Lelów castle. In the fifteenth century, the village's eldership was getting profit mainly from an inn located in the village.

In 1394, the king of Poland, Władysław Jagiełło, granted a village council of Biżycko to Śródka, whose commander obliged the village's male troops to appear at the Lelow castle with a crossbows during war expeditions.

Another note about village appears in 15th century by Jan Długosz, who also mentions n inn and church in Zrębice. Also village was mentioned in tax reports of Old town and Lelow. Population of Bliżyce in 1564 was 22 peasants.
