= Koclin =

- Village
- Location within Poland
- Coordinates: 50°33′46″N 19°14′34″E
- Country: Poland
- Voivodeship: Silesian
- County: Myszków
- Gmina: Koziegłowy

Koclin [ˈkɔt͡slin] is a village in the administrative district of Gmina Koziegłowy, within Myszków County, Silesian Voivodeship, in southern Poland.
