= Choroń-Baranowizna =

- Settlement
- Location within Poland
- Coordinates: 50°39′27″N 19°16′06″E
- Country: Poland
- Voivodeship: Silesian
- County: Myszków
- Gmina: Poraj

Choroń-Baranowizna [ˈxɔrɔɲ baranɔˈvizna] is a settlement in the administrative district of Gmina Poraj, within Myszków County, Silesian Voivodeship, in southern Poland.
