= Pustkowie Lgockie =

- Village
- Location within Poland
- Coordinates: 50°33′13″N 19°15′15″E
- Country: Poland
- Voivodeship: Silesian
- County: Myszków
- Gmina: Koziegłowy

Pustkowie Lgockie [pustˈkɔvjɛ ˈlɡɔt͡skʲɛ] is a village in the administrative district of Gmina Koziegłowy, within Myszków County, Silesian Voivodeship, in southern Poland.
