= Krusin, Silesian Voivodeship =

Krusin
- Village
- Location within Poland
- Coordinates: 50°33′17″N 19°8′37″E
- Country: Poland
- Voivodeship: Silesian
- County: Myszków
- Gmina: Koziegłowy
- Population: 240

Krusin [ˈkruɕin] is a village in the administrative district of Gmina Koziegłowy, within Myszków County, Silesian Voivodeship, in southern Poland.
