= Gorzków Stary =

- Village
- Location within Poland
- Coordinates: 50°40′45″N 19°29′19″E
- Country: Poland
- Voivodeship: Silesian
- County: Myszków
- Gmina: Niegowa

Gorzków Stary [ˈɡɔʂkuf ˈstarɨ] is a village in the administrative district of Gmina Niegowa, within Myszków County, Silesian Voivodeship, in southern Poland.
