= Gęzyn =

- Village
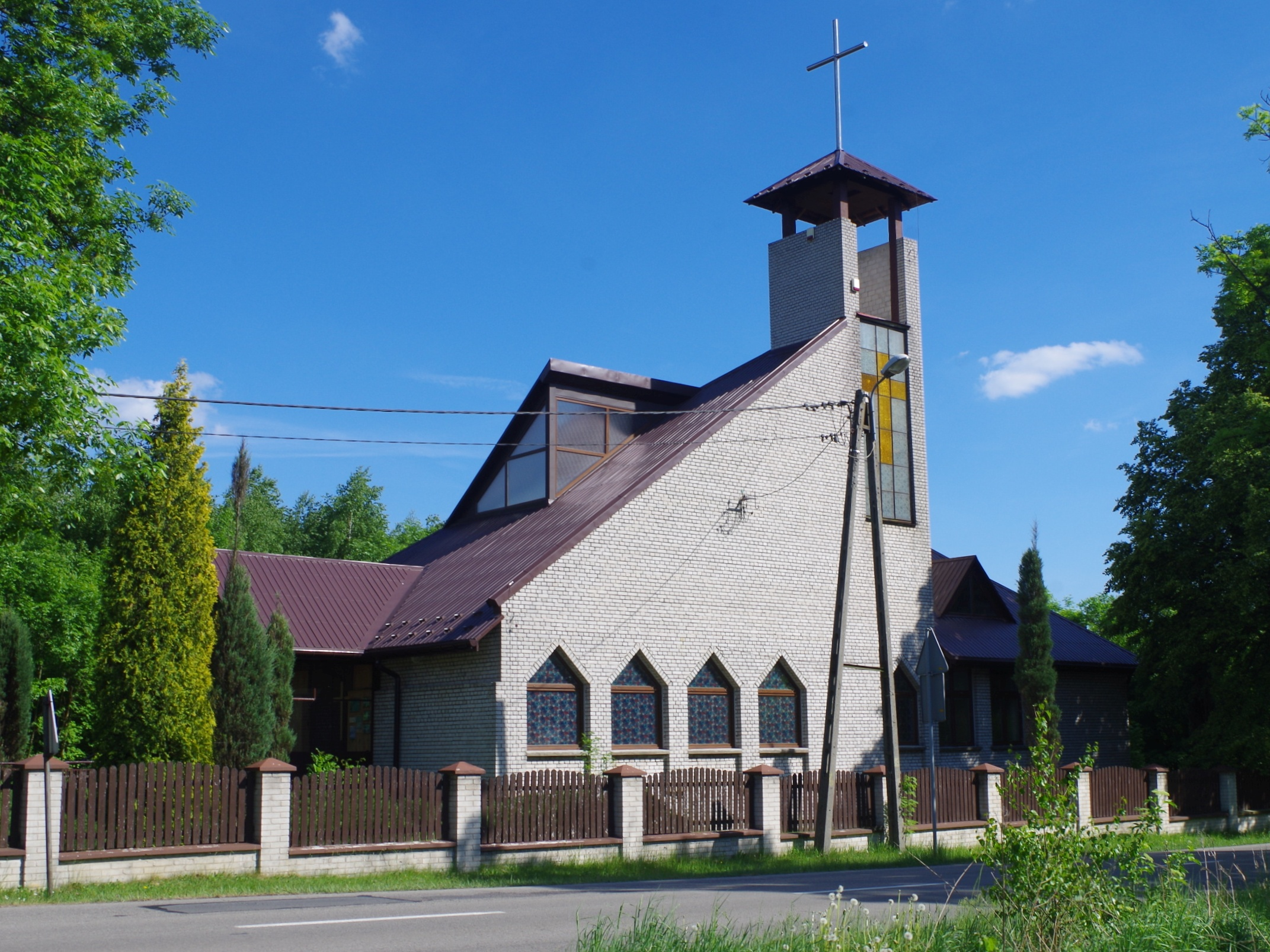
- Church in Gęzyn

- Location within Poland
- Coordinates: 50°38′19″N 19°12′21″E
- Country: Poland
- Voivodeship: Silesian
- County: Myszków
- Gmina: Poraj

Population
  - Total: 336

Gęzyn [ˈɡɛ̃zɨn] is a village in the administrative district of Gmina Poraj, within Myszków County, Silesian Voivodeship, in southern Poland.
