= Ordonka (river) =

Location
- Country: Poland

Physical characteristics
- Mouth
  - location: Warta
  - coordinates: 50.6509°N 19.2437°E

Basin features
- Progression: Warta→ Oder→ Baltic Sea

Ordonka is a small river of Poland, a tributary of the Warta River near Masłońskie.
