= Koziegłówki =

- Village
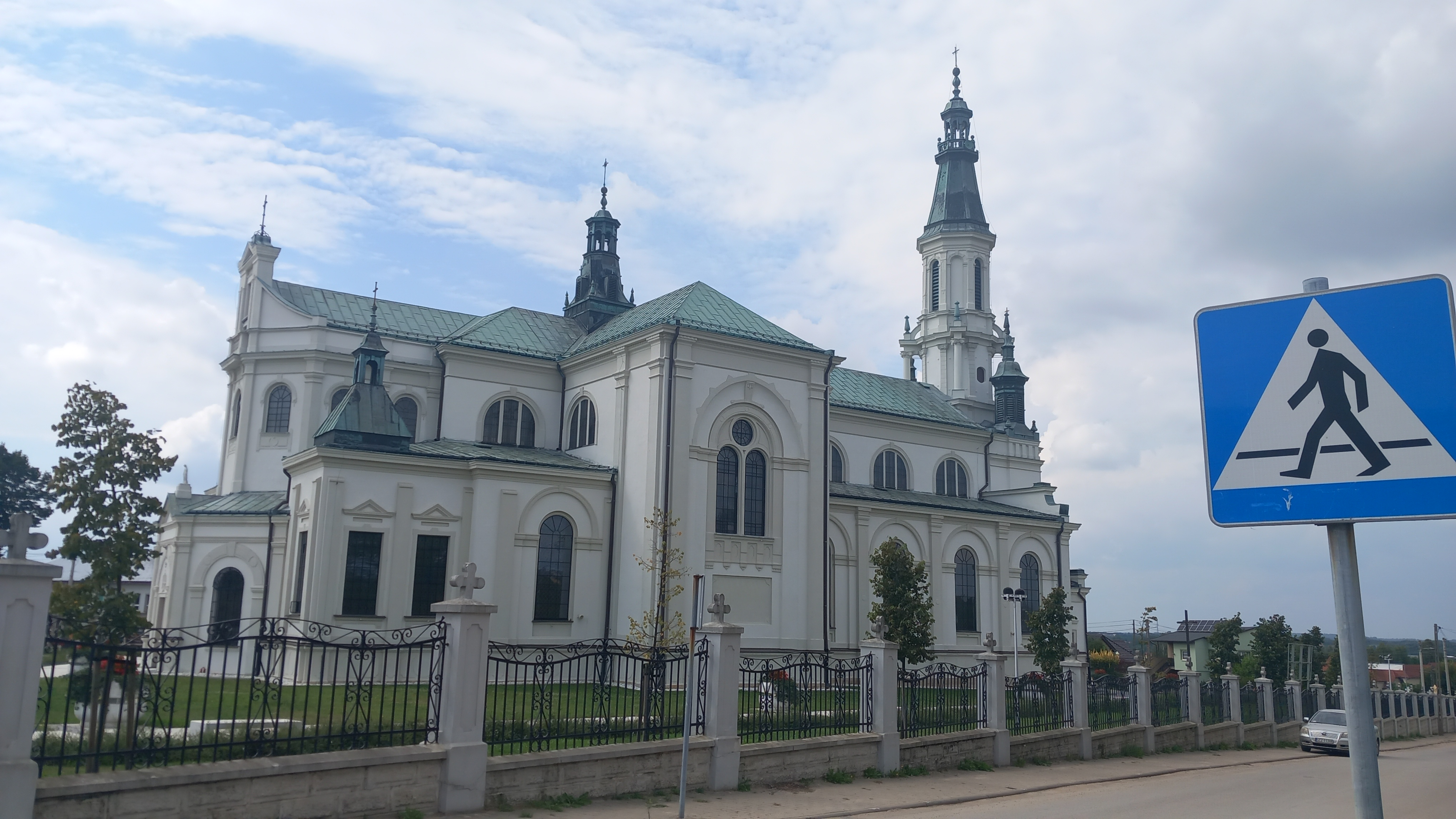
- Saint Anthony Sanctuary in Koziegłówki

- Location within Poland
- Coordinates: 50°35′12″N 19°11′0″E
- Country: Poland
- Voivodeship: Silesian
- County: Myszków
- Gmina: Koziegłowy
- Time zone: UTC+1 (CET)
  - Summer (DST): UTC+2 (CEST)
- Vehicle registration: SMY

Koziegłówki [kɔʑɛˈɡwufki] is a village in the administrative district of Gmina Koziegłowy, within Myszków County, Silesian Voivodeship, in southern Poland.

== History ==
Following the joint German-Soviet invasion of Poland, which started World War II in September 1939, it was occupied by Germany until 1945. In July 1943, the German gendarmerie carried out expulsions of 162 Poles, who were then deported to forced labour in Germany, while their houses were handed over to German colonists.
