= Wojsławice, Silesian Voivodeship =

Wojsławice
- Village
- Location within Poland
- Coordinates: 50°34′45″N 19°7′44″E
- Country: Poland
- Voivodeship: Silesian
- County: Myszków
- Gmina: Koziegłowy

Wojsławice [vɔi̯swaˈvit͡sɛ] is a village in the administrative district of Gmina Koziegłowy, within Myszków County, Silesian Voivodeship, in southern Poland.
