= Winowno =

- Village
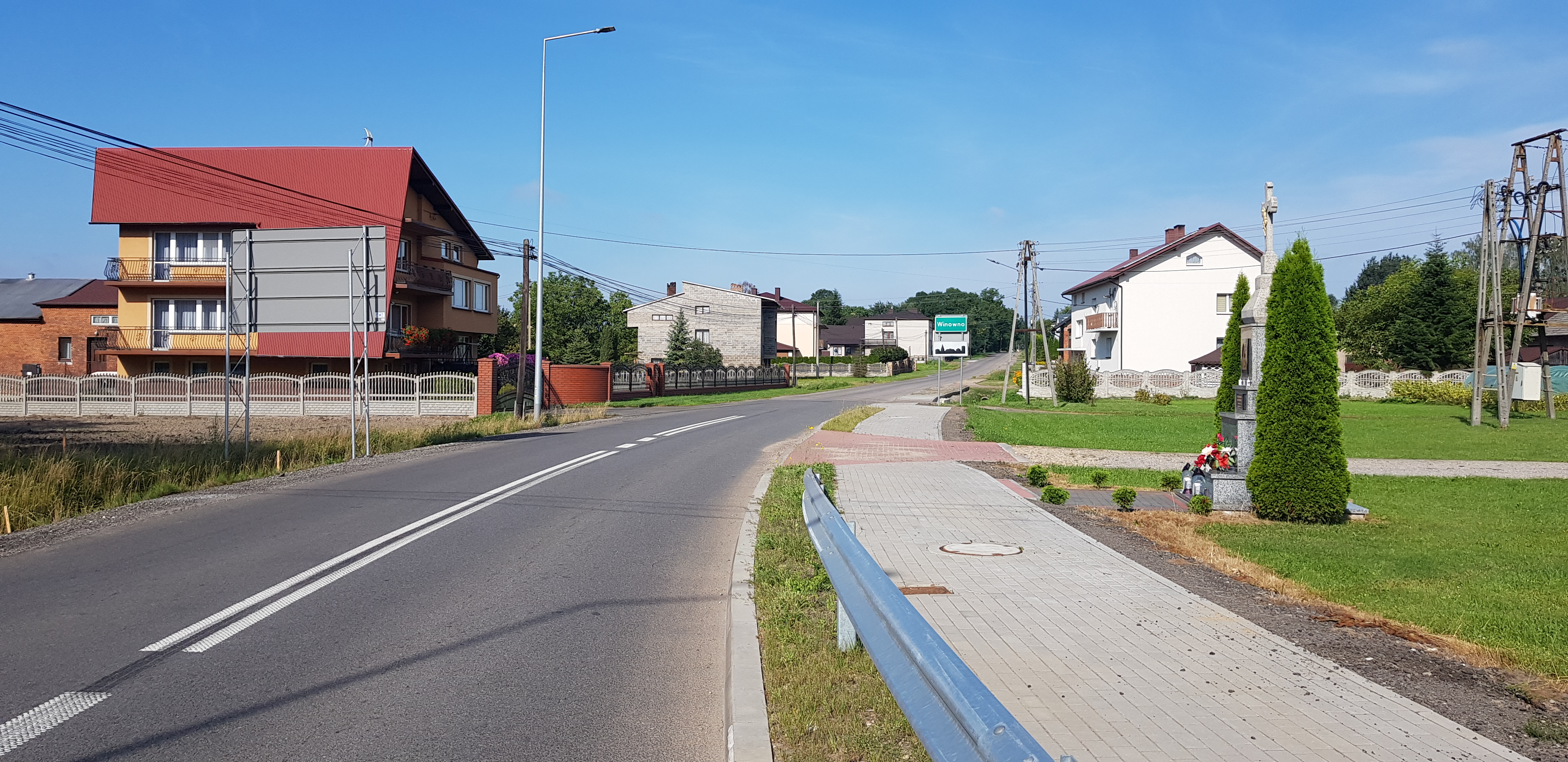

- Location within Poland
- Coordinates: 50°33′N 19°10′E
- Country: Poland
- Voivodeship: Silesian
- County: Myszków
- Gmina: Koziegłowy

Winowno [viˈnɔvnɔ] is a village in the administrative district of Gmina Koziegłowy, within Myszków County, Silesian Voivodeship, in southern Poland.
