= Mysłów, Silesian Voivodeship =

Mysłów
- Village
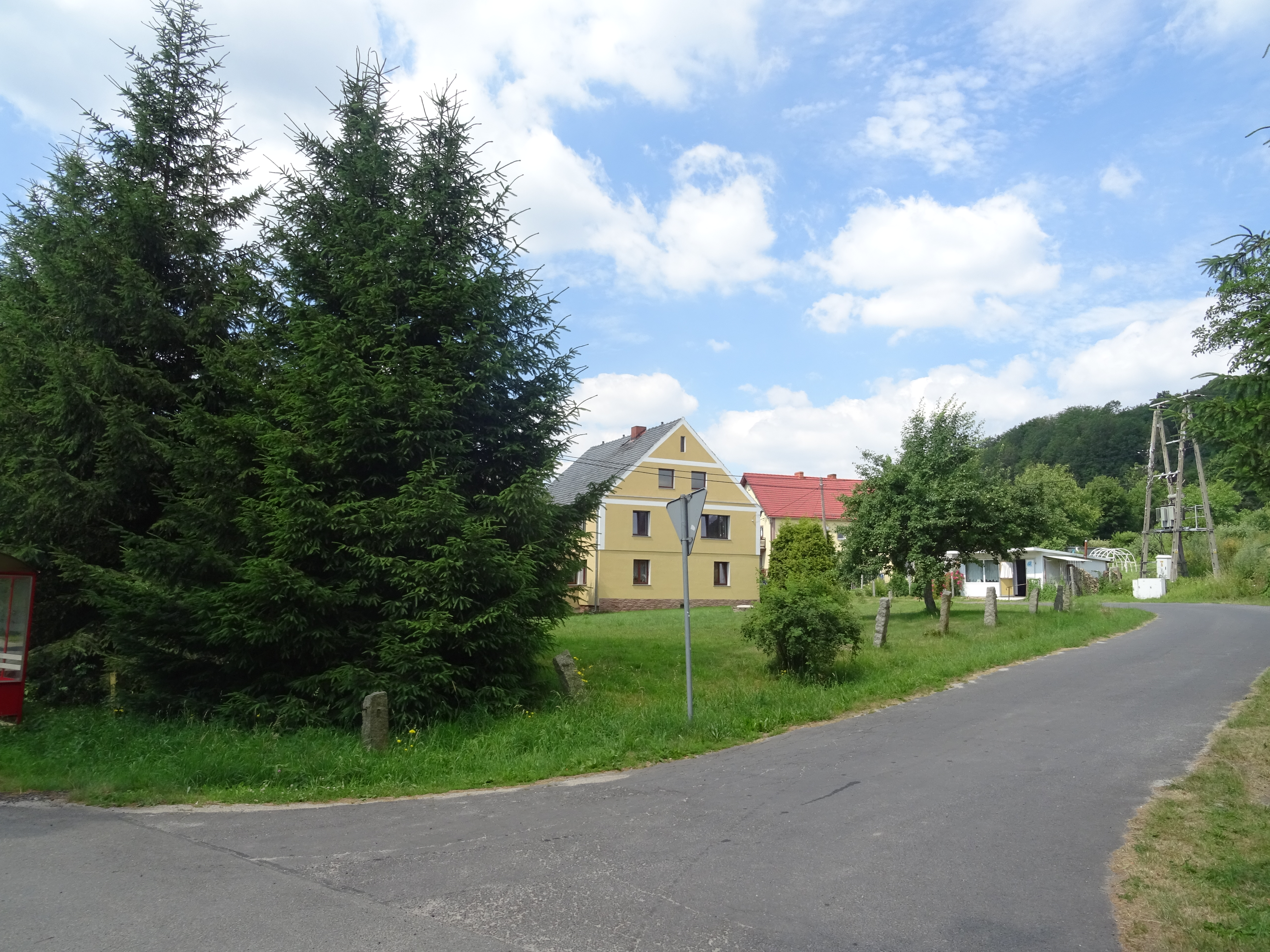

- Location within Poland
- Coordinates: 50°34′31″N 19°12′16″E
- Country: Poland
- Voivodeship: Silesian
- County: Myszków
- Gmina: Koziegłowy
- Time zone: UTC+1 (CET)
  - Summer (DST): UTC+2 (CEST)
- Vehicle registration: SMY

Mysłów [ˈmɨswuf] is a village in the administrative district of Gmina Koziegłowy, within Myszków County, Silesian Voivodeship, in southern Poland.

== History ==
During the invasion of Poland, which started World War II, on 3 September 1939, twenty two Polish residents of Mysłów, including ten children, were burned alive by the Germans (see Nazi crimes against the Polish nation).
