= Gmina Niegowa =

Gmina Niegowa Niegowa Commune
- Gmina
- Coat of arms
- Interactive map of Gmina Niegowa
- Coordinates (Niegowa): 50°39′N 19°29′E
- Country: Poland
- Voivodeship: Silesian
- County: Myszków
- Seat: Niegowa

Area
  - Total: 87.57 km^{2} (33.81 sq mi)

Population (2019-06-30)
  - Total: 5,642
  - Density: 64.43/km^{2} (166.9/sq mi)
- Website: http://www.niegowa.pl/

Gmina Niegowa is a rural gmina (administrative district) in Myszków County, Silesian Voivodeship, in southern Poland. Its seat is the village of Niegowa, which lies approximately 14 kilometres (9 mi) north-east of Myszków and 57 km (35 mi) north-east of the regional capital Katowice.

The gmina covers an area of 87.57 square kilometres (33.8 sq mi), and as of 2019 its total population is 5,642.

== Villages ==
Gmina Niegowa contains the villages and settlements of Antolka, Bliżyce, Bobolice, Brzeziny, Dąbrowno, Gorzków Nowy, Gorzków Stary, Ludwinów, Łutowiec, Mirów, Moczydło, Mzurów, Niegowa, Niegówka, Ogorzelnik, Postaszowice, Sokolniki, Tomiszowice, Trzebniów and Zagórze.

== Neighbouring gminas ==
Gmina Niegowa is bordered by the gminas of Irządze, Janów, Kroczyce, Lelów, Włodowice and Żarki.
