= Gniazdów, Silesian Voivodeship =

Gniazdów
- Village
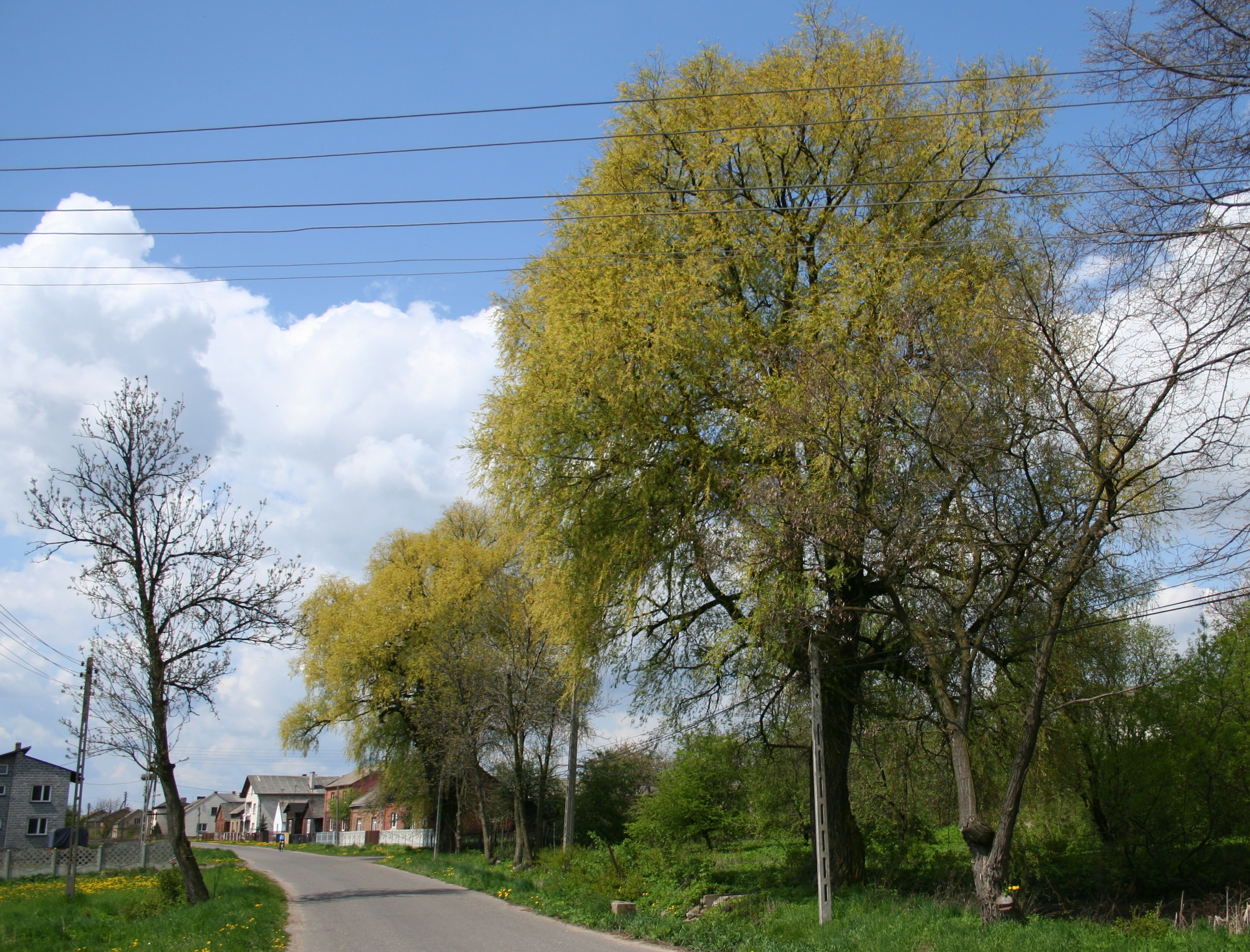

- Location within Poland
- Coordinates: 50°35′N 19°6′E
- Country: Poland
- Voivodeship: Silesian
- County: Myszków
- Gmina: Koziegłowy
- Population: 1,100

Gniazdów [ˈɡɲazduf] is a village in the administrative district of Gmina Koziegłowy, within Myszków County, Silesian Voivodeship, in southern Poland.
