= Gmina Koziegłowy =

Gmina Koziegłowy Koziegłowy Commune
- Gmina
- Coat of arms
- Interactive map of Gmina Koziegłowy
- Coordinates (Koziegłowy): 50°36′3″N 19°9′53″E
- Country: Poland
- Voivodeship: Silesian
- County: Myszków
- Seat: Koziegłowy

Area
  - Total: 159.16 km^{2} (61.45 sq mi)

Population (2019-06-30)
  - Total: 14,319
  - Density: 89.966/km^{2} (233.01/sq mi)
  - Urban: 2,455
  - Rural: 11,864
- Website: http://www.kozieglowy.pl

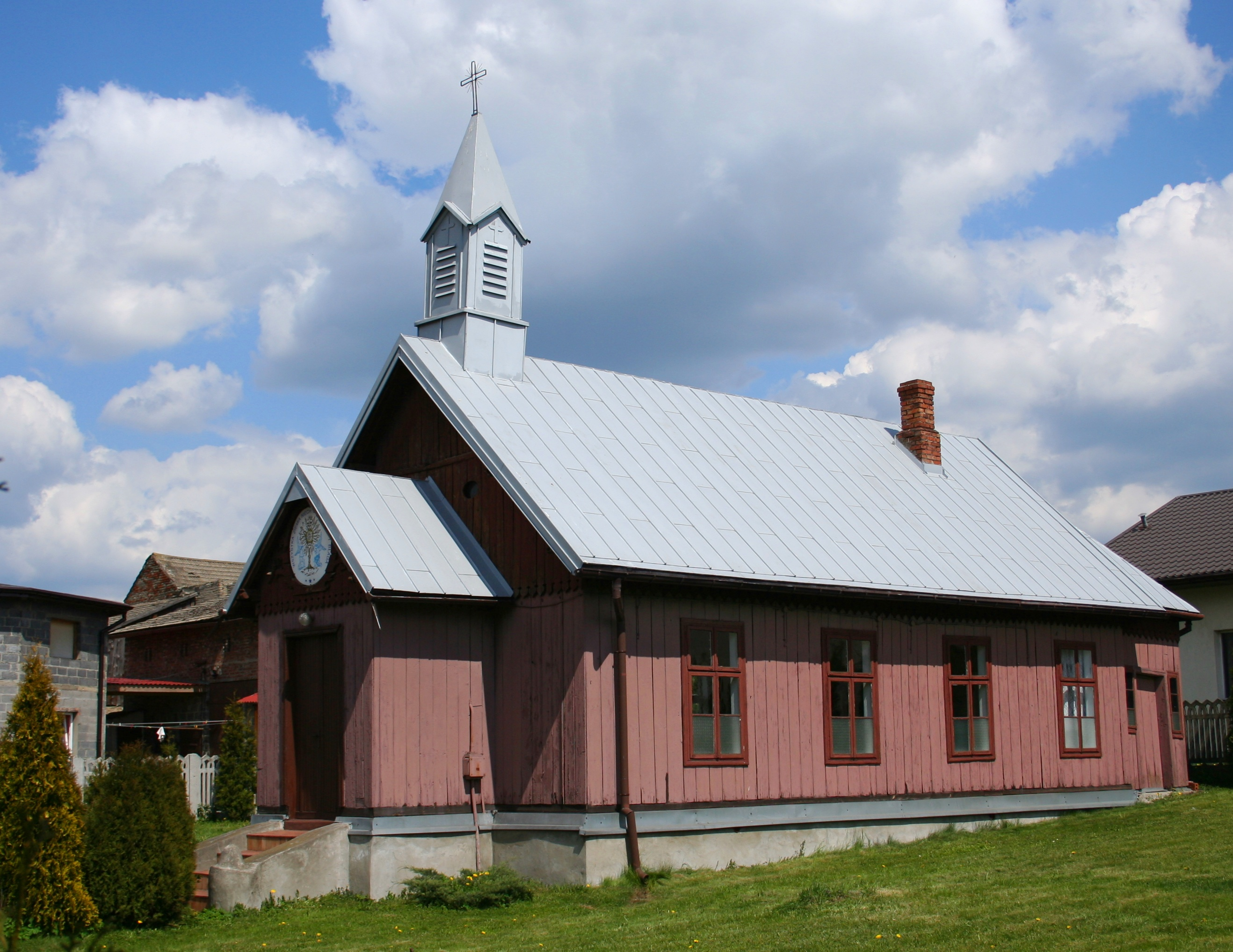
Koziegłowy kościół Mariawitów

Gmina Koziegłowy is an urban-rural gmina (administrative district) in Myszków County, Silesian Voivodeship, in southern Poland. Its seat is the town of Koziegłowy, which lies approximately 11 kilometres (7 mi) west of Myszków and 41 km (25 mi) north of the regional capital Katowice.

The gmina covers an area of 159.16 square kilometres (61.5 sq mi), and as of 2019 its total population is 14,319.

== Villages ==
Apart from the town of Koziegłowy, Gmina Koziegłowy contains the villages and settlements of Cynków, Gliniana Góra, Gniazdów, Koclin, Koziegłówki, Krusin, Lgota Górna, Lgota-Mokrzesz, Lgota-Nadwarcie, Markowice, Miłość, Mysłów, Mzyki, Nowa Kuźnica, Oczko, Osiek, Pińczyce, Postęp, Pustkowie Lgockie, Rosochacz, Rzeniszów, Siedlec Duży, Stara Huta, Winowno, Wojsławice and Zabijak.

== Neighbouring gminas ==
Gmina Koziegłowy is bordered by the town of Myszków and by the gminas of Kamienica Polska, Ożarowice, Poraj, Siewierz and Woźniki.

== Twin towns – sister cities ==
Gmina Koziegłowy is twinned with:

- Vatra Dornei, Romania
