= Niegowa =

- Village
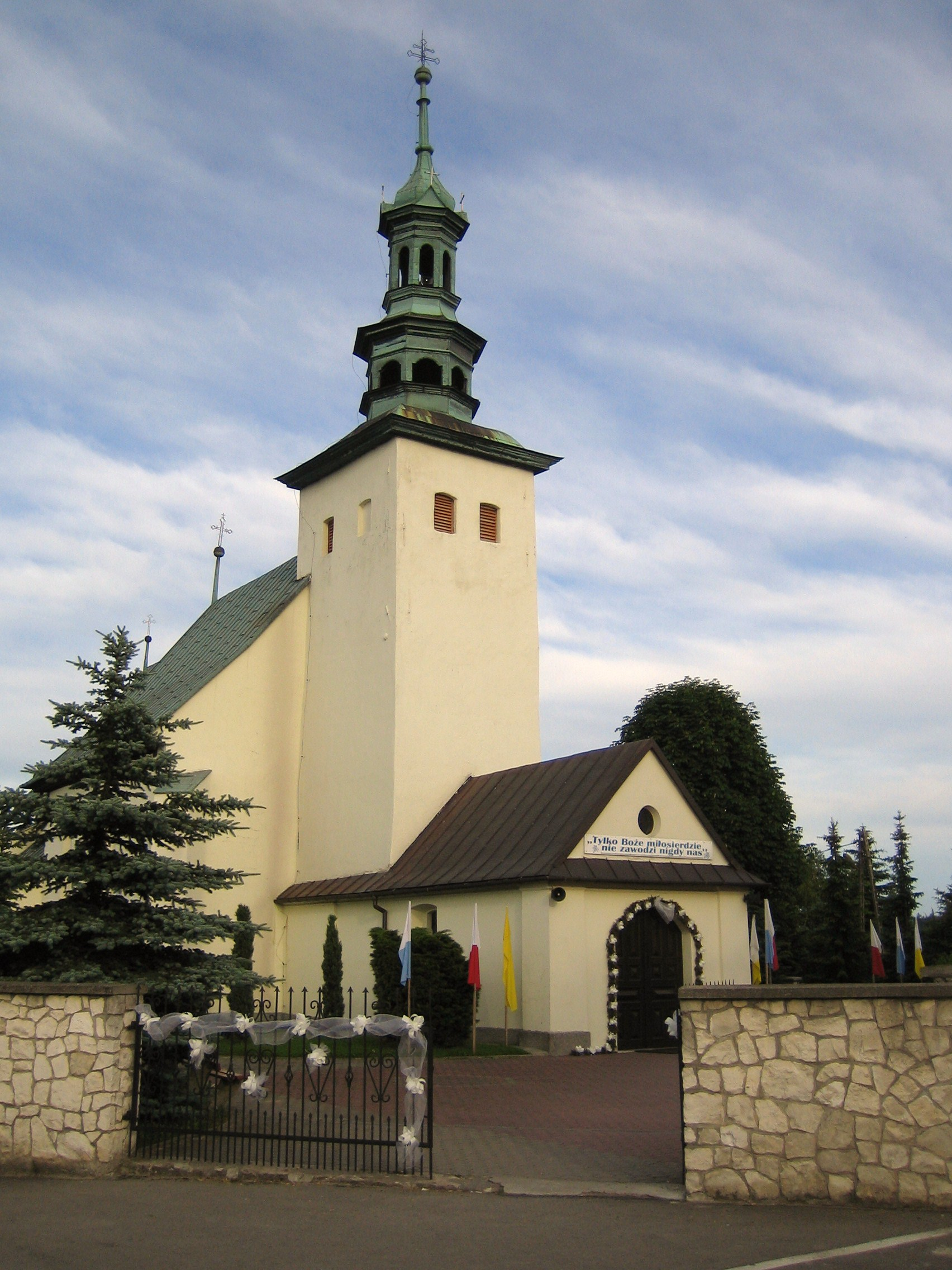
- Saint Nicholas Church

- Location within Poland
- Coordinates: 50°39′N 19°29′E
- Country: Poland
- Voivodeship: Silesian
- County: Myszków
- Gmina: Niegowa

Niegowa [ɲɛˈɡɔva] is a village in Myszków County, Silesian Voivodeship, in southern Poland. It is the seat of the gmina (administrative district) called Gmina Niegowa.
