= Masłońskie =

- Village
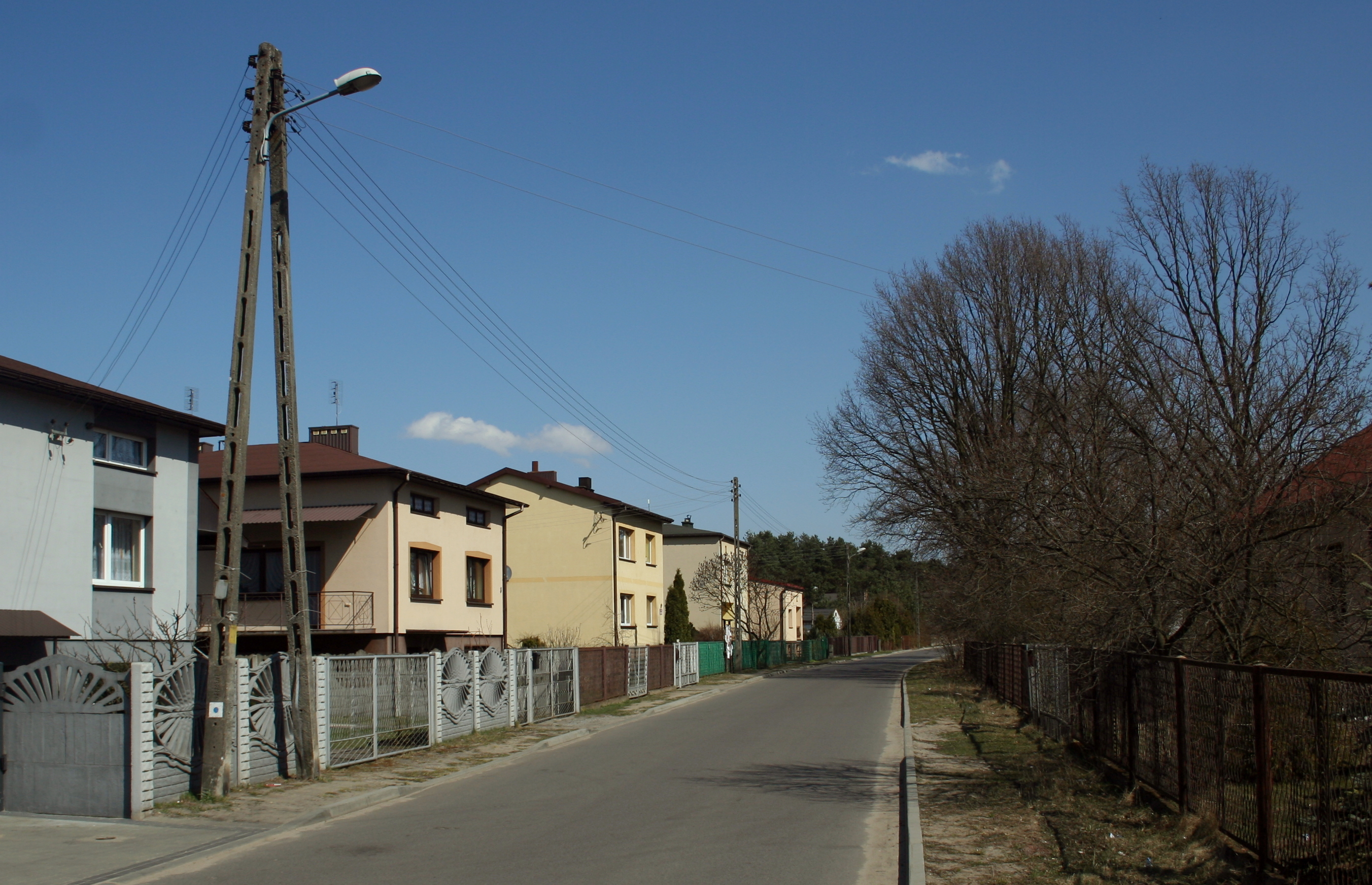

- Location within Poland
- Coordinates: 50°38′N 19°14′E
- Country: Poland
- Voivodeship: Silesian
- County: Myszków
- Gmina: Poraj
- Population: 600

Masłońskie [maˈswɔɲskʲɛ] is a village in the administrative district of Gmina Poraj, within Myszków County, Silesian Voivodeship, in southern Poland.
