= Cięcina =

- Village
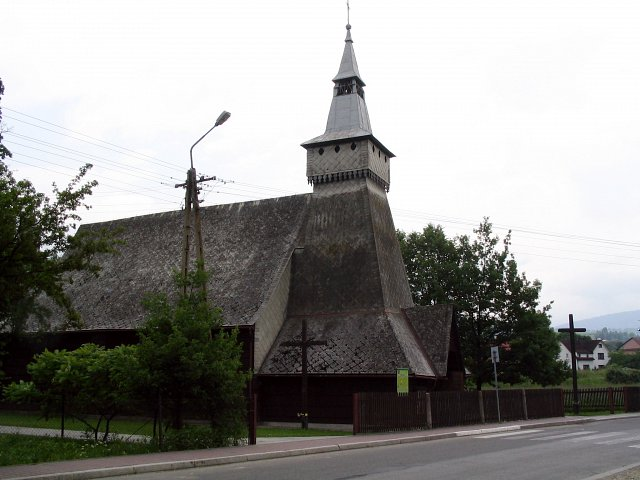
- Saint Catherine Church

- Location within Poland
- Coordinates: 49°36′N 19°8′E
- Country: Poland
- Voivodeship: Silesian
- County: Żywiec
- Gmina: Węgierska Górka
- Established: 13th century
- Population: 4,373

Cięcina [t͡ɕɛnˈt͡ɕina] is a village in the administrative district of Gmina Węgierska Górka, within Żywiec County, Silesian Voivodeship, in southern Poland.

It is one of the oldest villages in Żywiec Basin. It was established in the 13th century, and in the next century it became a seat of a Catholic parish. There is a wooden Saint Catherine Church from the 16th century, an important landmark in the village.

== Notable industry ==
- Żywiec Zdrój
