= Poraj, Silesian Voivodeship =

Poraj
- Village
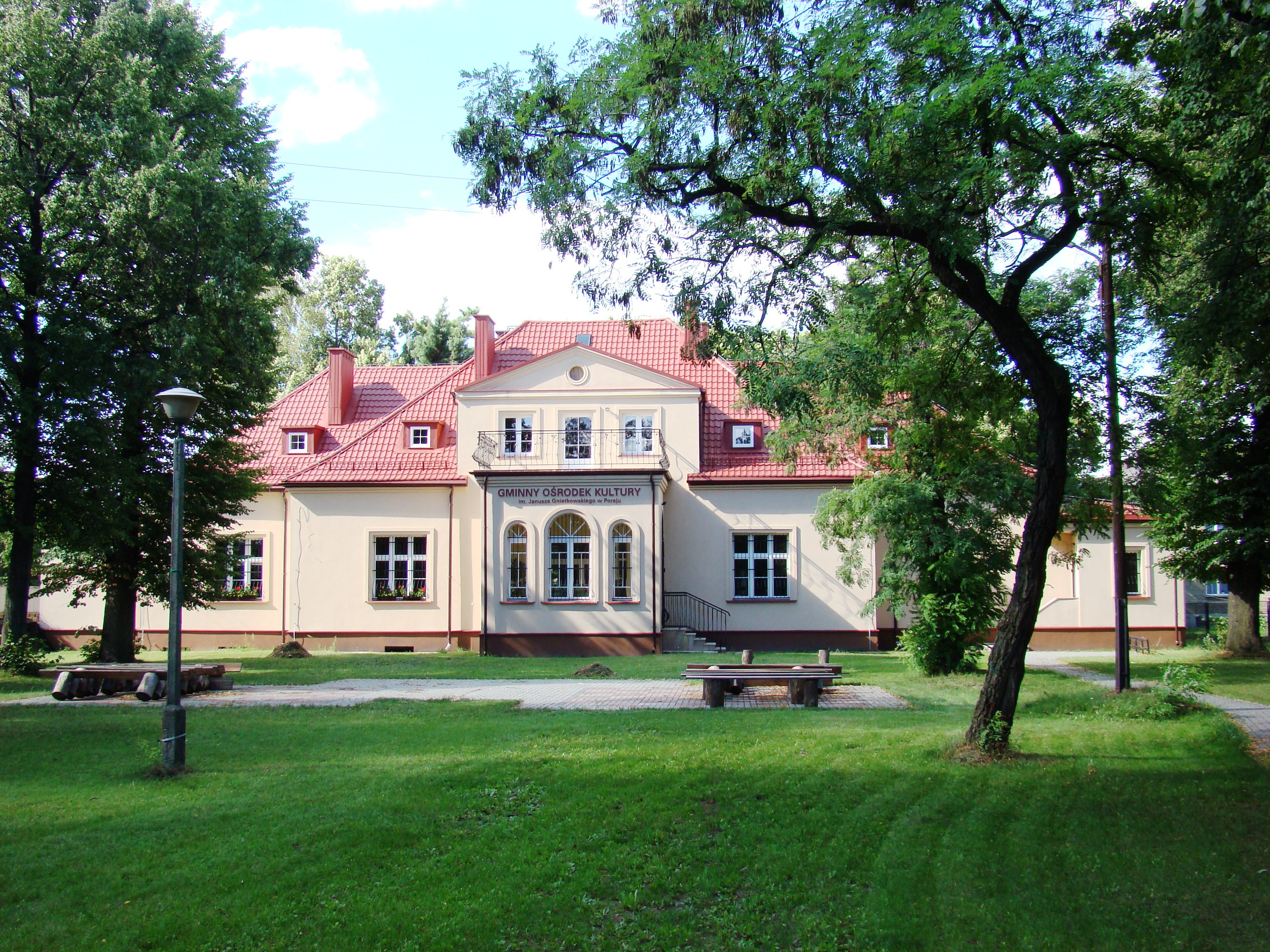
- Manor in Poraj

- Location within Poland
- Coordinates: 50°40′44″N 19°12′58″E
- Country: Poland
- Voivodeship: Silesian
- County: Myszków
- Gmina: Poraj

Population
  - Total: 4,000

Poraj [ˈpɔrai̯] is a village in Myszków County, Silesian Voivodeship, in southern Poland. It is the seat of the gmina (administrative district) called Gmina Poraj.
