= Rzeniszów =

- Village
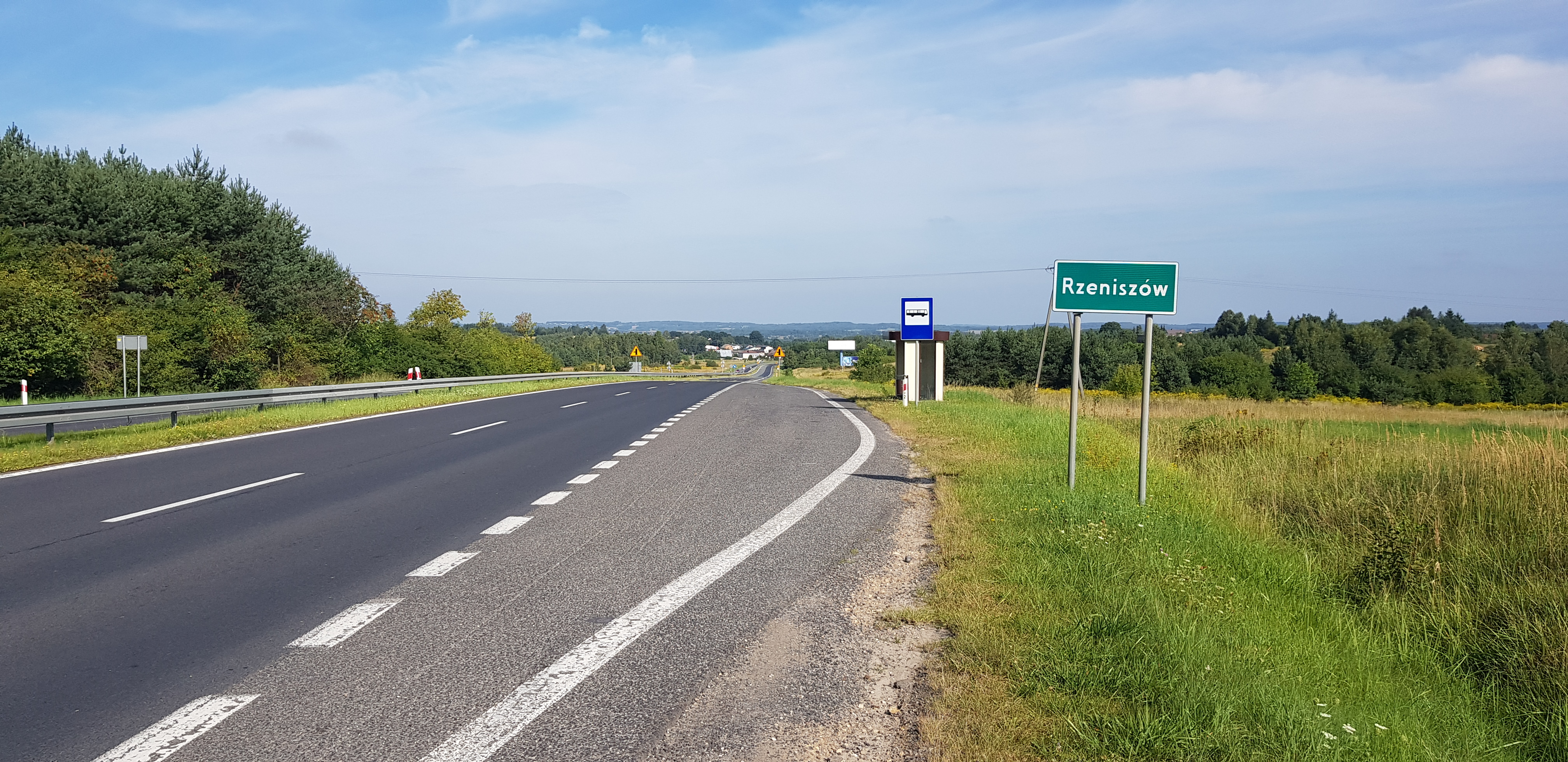

- Location within Poland
- Coordinates: 50°34′25″N 19°9′33″E
- Country: Poland
- Voivodeship: Silesian
- County: Myszków
- Gmina: Koziegłowy
- Population: 390

Rzeniszów [ʐɛˈniʂuf] is a village in the administrative district of Gmina Koziegłowy, within Myszków County, Silesian Voivodeship, in southern Poland.
