= Belá-Dulice =

- Municipality
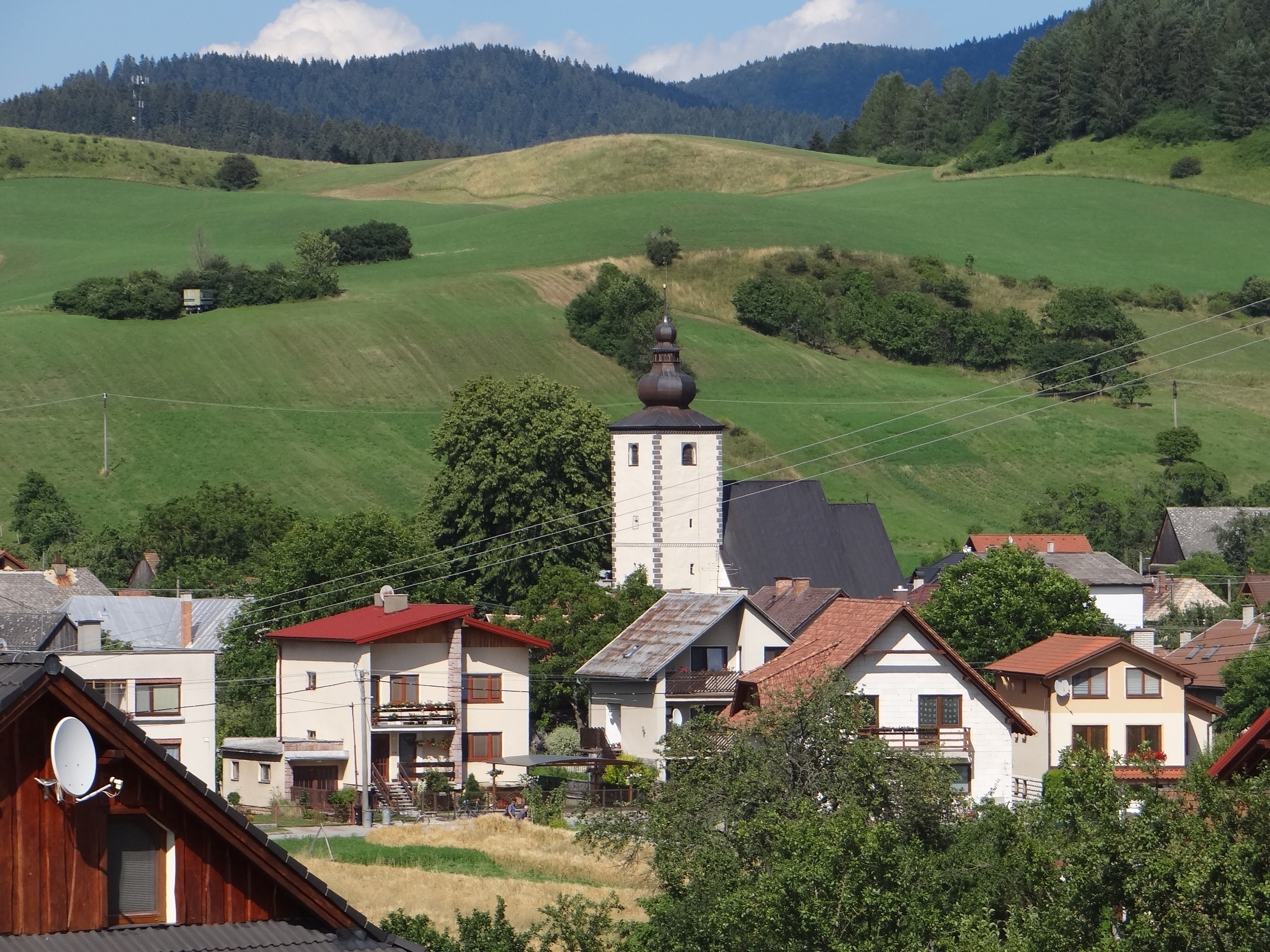

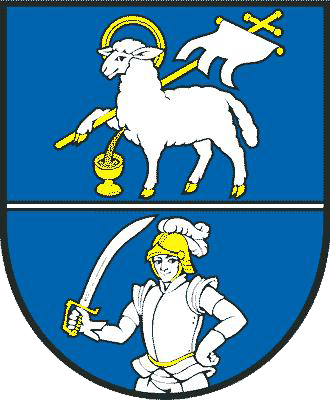
- Flag Coat of arms

- Location of Belá-Dulice in the Žilina Region Location of Belá-Dulice in Slovakia
- Coordinates: 49.00°N 18.98°E
- Country: Slovakia
- Region: Žilina Region
- District: Martin District
- First mentioned: 1282

Area
  - Total: 51.17 km^{2} (19.76 sq mi)
- Elevation: 512 m (1,680 ft)

Population (2025)
  - Total: 1,246
- Time zone: UTC+1 (CET)
  - Summer (DST): UTC+2 (CEST)
- Postal code: 381 1
- Area code: +421 43
- Vehicle registration plate (until 2022): MT
- Website: www.beladulice.sk

Belá-Dulice (Hungarian: Bélagyulafalva, German: Bella-Dulitz) is a village and municipality in Martin District in the Žilina Region of northern Slovakia.

== History ==
In historical records the village was first mentioned in 1282. Before the establishment of independent Czechoslovakia in 1918, it was part of Turóc County within the Kingdom of Hungary. From 1939 to 1945, it was part of the Slovak Republic.

== Geography ==
The municipality lies at an altitude of 512 metres (1,680 ft) and covers an area of 51.17 km^{2} (19.76 sq mi) (2025).

== Population ==
Population statistic (10 years)
Year	1995	2005	2015	2025
Count	1219	1240	1268	1246
Difference		+1.72%	+2.25%	−1.73%

Population statistic
Year	2024	2025
Count	1232	1246
Difference		+1.13%

It has a population of 1246 people (31 December 2025).

=== Ethnicity ===
Census 2021 (1+ %)
Ethnicity	Number	Fraction
Slovak	1202	97.32%
Not found out	28	2.26%
Total	1235	

In year 2021 was 1235 people by ethnicity 1202 as Slovak, 28 as Not found out, 9 as Czech, 4 as Rusyn, 4 as Other, 2 as Serbian and 1 as Romani.

Note on population: The difference values of population numbers in the table "Population statistic" and in the sections "Ethnicity" & "Religion" is caused by the use of various statistical methods.

=== Religion ===
Census 2021 (1+ %)
Religion	Number	Fraction
Evangelical Church	571	46.23%
None	363	29.39%
Roman Catholic Church	233	18.87%
Not found out	49	3.97%
Total	1235	

In year 2021 was 1235 people by religion 571 from Evangelical Church, 363 from None, 233 from Roman Catholic Church, 49 from Not found out, 12 from Greek Catholic Church, 3 from Ad hoc movements, 2 from Other, 1 from Other and not ascertained christian church and 1 from Islam.

== Genealogical resources ==
The records for genealogical research are available at the state archive "Statny Archiv in Bytca, Slovakia"

- Roman Catholic church records (births/marriages/deaths): 1777-11949 (parish B)
- Lutheran church records (births/marriages/deaths): 1689-1895 (parish B)

== See also ==
- List of municipalities and towns in Slovakia
