= Koziegłowy, Silesian Voivodeship =

Koziegłowy
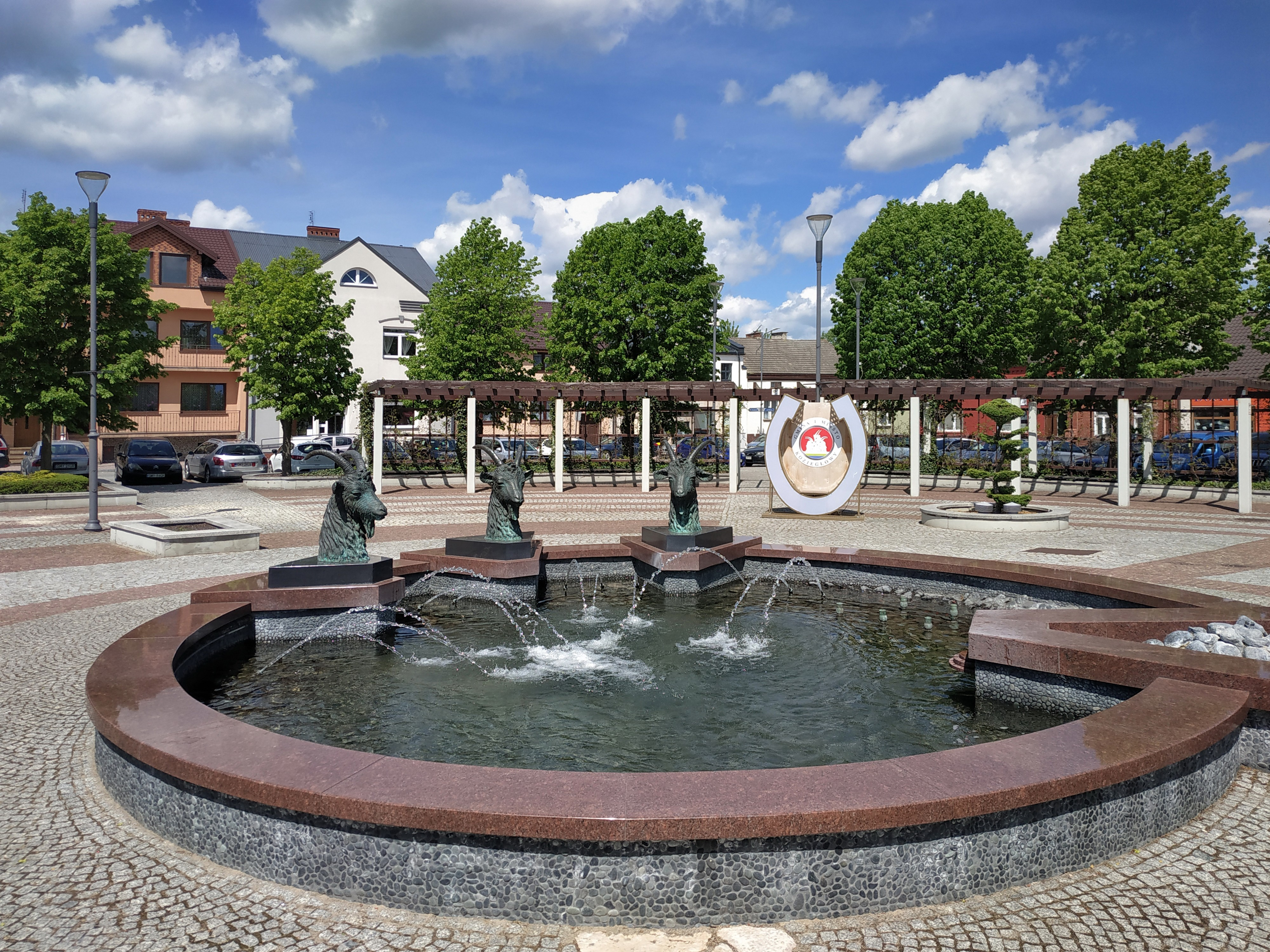
- Fountain at the Market Square (Rynek)

- Coat of arms

- Location within Poland
- Coordinates: 50°36′3″N 19°9′53″E
- Country: Poland
- Voivodeship: Silesian
- County: Myszków
- Gmina: Koziegłowy

Area
  - Total: 26.72 km^{2} (10.32 sq mi)

Population (2019-06-30)
  - Total: 2,455
  - Density: 91.88/km^{2} (238.0/sq mi)
- Time zone: UTC+1 (CET)
  - Summer (DST): UTC+2 (CEST)
- Postal code: 42-350
- Vehicle registration: SMY
- Website: https://www.kozieglowy.pl

Koziegłowy [kɔʑɛˈɡwɔvɨ] is a town in Myszków County, Silesian Voivodeship, in southern Poland, with 2,455 inhabitants (2019).

== History ==
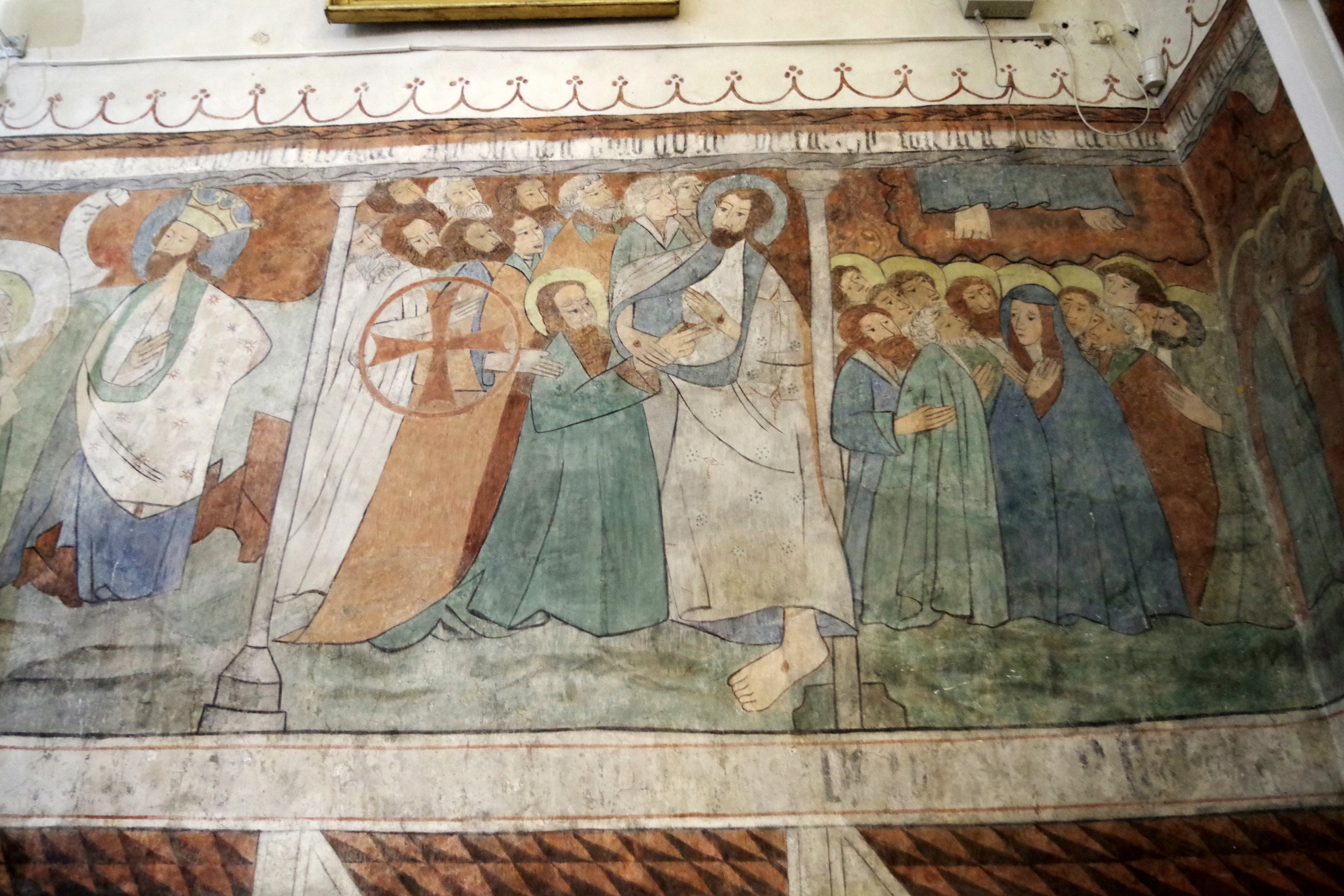
Gothic polychromes in the Saint Mary Magdalene church

Since its foundation Koziegłowy belonged to Lesser Poland's Kraków Voivodeship, and in 1519 local nobleman named Krystyn IV (Lis coat of arms) sold the village with the castle to Archbishop of Kraków, Jan Konarski. Koziegłowy then became part of the Duchy of Siewierz, which in 1790 was merged with Lesser Poland. On April 27, 1792, Koziegłowy received its town charter from King Stanisław August Poniatowski.

In the Third Partition of Poland in 1795 the town was annexed by the Kingdom of Prussia, becoming part of the province of New Silesia. In 1807 it was regained by Poles and included within the short-lived Duchy of Warsaw, and after the duchy's dissolution in 1815 it became part of Russian-controlled Congress Poland. Following other Lesser Poland's towns, the Russians stripped Koziegłowy of its charter (1870), reducing it to the status of a village. In 1918 Koziegłowy returned to re-established Poland, and it belonged to Second Polish Republic's Kielce Voivodeship.

It was captured by the German Wehrmacht during the invasion of Poland, which started World War II in September 1939. The local police chief and another Polish policeman were murdered by the Russians in the Katyn massacre in 1940. In August 1942, the German gendarmerie carried out expulsions of 69 Poles, who were then deported to forced labour in Germany, while their houses were handed over to German colonists. The Jewish population was mass murdered by the occupiers in the Holocaust. On January 20, 1945, the village was captured by the Red Army and then restored to Poland.

Koziegłowy again became a town in 1949.

== Sights ==
Among points of interest there is St. Mary Magdalene church with preserved medieval Gothic polychromes, a 15th-century presbytery and a 1679 nave, and ruins of the 14th-century castle of the Lis family.

== Notable people ==
- Aryeh Tzvi Frumer (1884–1943), Rabbi of the town.
