= Myszków County =

Myszków County Powiat myszkowski
- County
- Flag Coat of arms

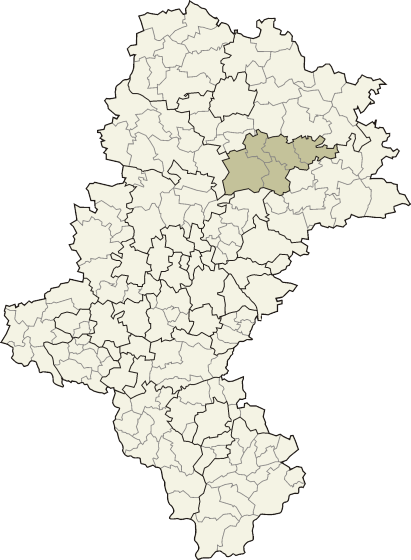
- Location within Silesian Voivodeship
- Coordinates (Myszków): 50°35′N 19°19′E
- Country: Poland
- Voivodeship: Silesian
- Seat: Myszków
- Gminas: Total 5 (incl. 1 urban): Myszków; Gmina Koziegłowy; Gmina Niegowa; Gmina Poraj; Gmina Żarki

Area
  - Total: 478.62 km^{2} (184.80 sq mi)

Population (2019-06-30)
  - Total: 70,959
  - Density: 148.26/km^{2} (383.99/sq mi)
  - Urban: 38,661
  - Rural: 32,298
- Car plates: SMY
- Website: www.powiatmyszkowski.pl

Myszków County (Polish: powiat myszkowski) is a unit of territorial administration and local government (powiat) in Silesian Voivodeship, southern Poland. It came into being on January 1, 1999, as a result of the Polish local government reforms passed in 1998. Its administrative seat and largest town is Myszków, which lies 44 kilometres (27 mi) north-east of the regional capital Katowice. The county also contains the towns of Żarki, lying 7 km (4 mi) north-east of Myszków, and Koziegłowy, 11 km (7 mi) west of Myszków.

The county covers an area of 478.62 square kilometres (184.8 sq mi). As of 2019 its total population is 70,959, out of which the population of Myszków is 31,650, that of Żarki is 4,556, that of Koziegłowy is 2,455, and the rural population is 32,298.

== Neighbouring counties ==
Myszków County is bordered by Częstochowa County to the north, Zawiercie County to the south-east, Będzin County to the south, and Tarnowskie Góry County and Lubliniec County to the west.

== Administrative divisions ==
The county is subdivided into five gminas (one urban, two urban-rural and two rural). These are listed in the following table, in descending order of population.

| Gmina | Type | Area (km^{2}) | Population (2019) | Seat |
|---|---|---|---|---|
| Myszków | urban | 72.7 | 31,650 | |
| Gmina Koziegłowy | urban-rural | 159.2 | 14,319 | Koziegłowy |
| Gmina Poraj | rural | 58.5 | 10,902 | Poraj |
| Gmina Żarki | urban-rural | 100.7 | 8,446 | Żarki |
| Gmina Niegowa | rural | 87.6 | 5,642 | Niegowa |
