= Trail of the Eagles' Nests =

Walking trail in Poland

Coordinates: 50°28′44″N 19°33′12″E

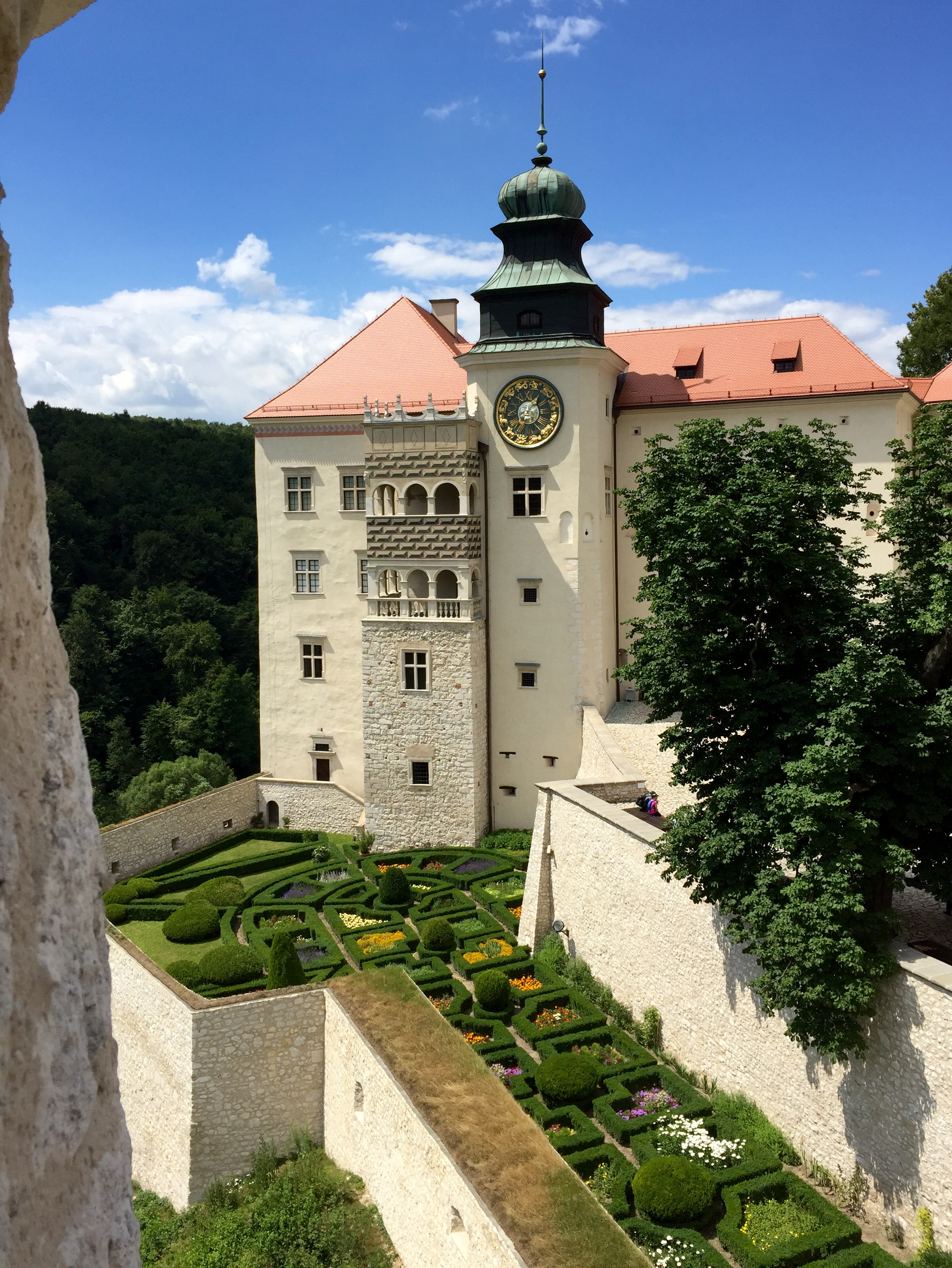
Castle in Pieskowa Skała on the marked Trail of the Eagles' Nests

The Trail of the Eagles' Nests (Polish: Szlak Orlich Gniazd) of south-western Poland, is a marked trail along a chain of 25 medieval castles between Częstochowa and Kraków. The Trail of the Eagles' Nests was first marked by Kazimierz Sosnowski. Since 1980, much of the area has been designated a protected area known as the Eagle Nests Landscape Park (Polish: Park Krajobrazowy Orlich Gniazd).

The castles date mostly to the 14th century, and were constructed probably by the order of King of Poland Casimir the Great. The trail has been named the "Eagles' Nests", as most of the castles are located on large, tall rocks of the Polish Jura Chain featuring many limestone cliffs, monadnocks and valleys below. They were built along the 14th-century border of Lesser Poland with the province of Silesia, which at that time belonged to the Kingdom of Bohemia.

The Trail of the Eagles' Nests is considered one of the best tourist trails in Poland, marked as No. 1 on the official list of most popular trails in the country. It encompasses all 25 castles and watchtowers, and is 163 kilometres (101 miles) long (the bicycle trail is 188 km (117 mi) long). Most of the sites can also be reached by bus.

== The castles of the Eagles' Nests ==
The Eagles' Nests castles (Polish: Orle Gniazda), many of which survived only in the form of picturesque ruins, are perched high on the tallest rocks between Częstochowa and the former Polish capital Kraków. The castles were built to protect Kraków as well as important trading routes against the foreign invaders. Later, the castles passed on into the hands of various Polish aristocratic families.

The Eagles' Nests castles along the marked trail (*) including similar structures of the Polish Jura
| Royal castles | Knight's castles | Defensive watchtowers |
| 1. Będzin Castle *; 2. Bobolice Castle *; 3. Brzeźnica Castle; 4. Kraków - Wawel *; 5. Krzepice Castle; 6. Lelów Castle; 7. Ojców Castle *; 8. Olsztyn Castle *; 9. Ostrężnik Castle; 10. Rabsztyn Castle *; 11. Wieluń Castle; 12. Żarnowiec Castle; Episcopal castles: 1. Babice - Lipowiec Castle; 2. Siewierz Castle *; 3. Sławków Castle | 1. Biały Kościół Castle; 2. Bobrek Castle; 3. Bydlin Castle *; 4. Częstochowa - Błeszno Castle; 5. Danków Castle; 6. Koniecpol - Chrząstów Castle; 7. Koniecpol Stary Castle; 8. Korzkiew Castle *; 9. Koziegłowy Castle; 10. Kraków - Gródek Castle; 11. Tyniec - Tenczyn Castle; 12. Krzykawka Castle; 13. Mirów Castle *; 14. Morawica Castle; 15. Morsko - Bąkowiec Castle *; 16. Pieskowa Skała *; 17. Pilica Castle *; 18. Podzamcze - Ogrodzieniec Castle *; 19. Rudno - Tenczyn Castle; 20. Smoleń Castle *; 21. Udórz Castle; 22. Żarki Castle | 1. Częstochowa - Mirów; 2. Giebło; 3. Klucze; 4. Łutowiec Castle; 5. Przewodziszowice; 6. Ryczów Castle; 7. Siedlec n. Będzin; 8. Suliszowice; 9. Wiesiółka; 10. Złoty Potok; Residential-defensive towers: 1. Dubie; 2. Grabowa; 3. Kraków - Zwierzyniec; 4. Kwaśniów |

== Picture gallery ==
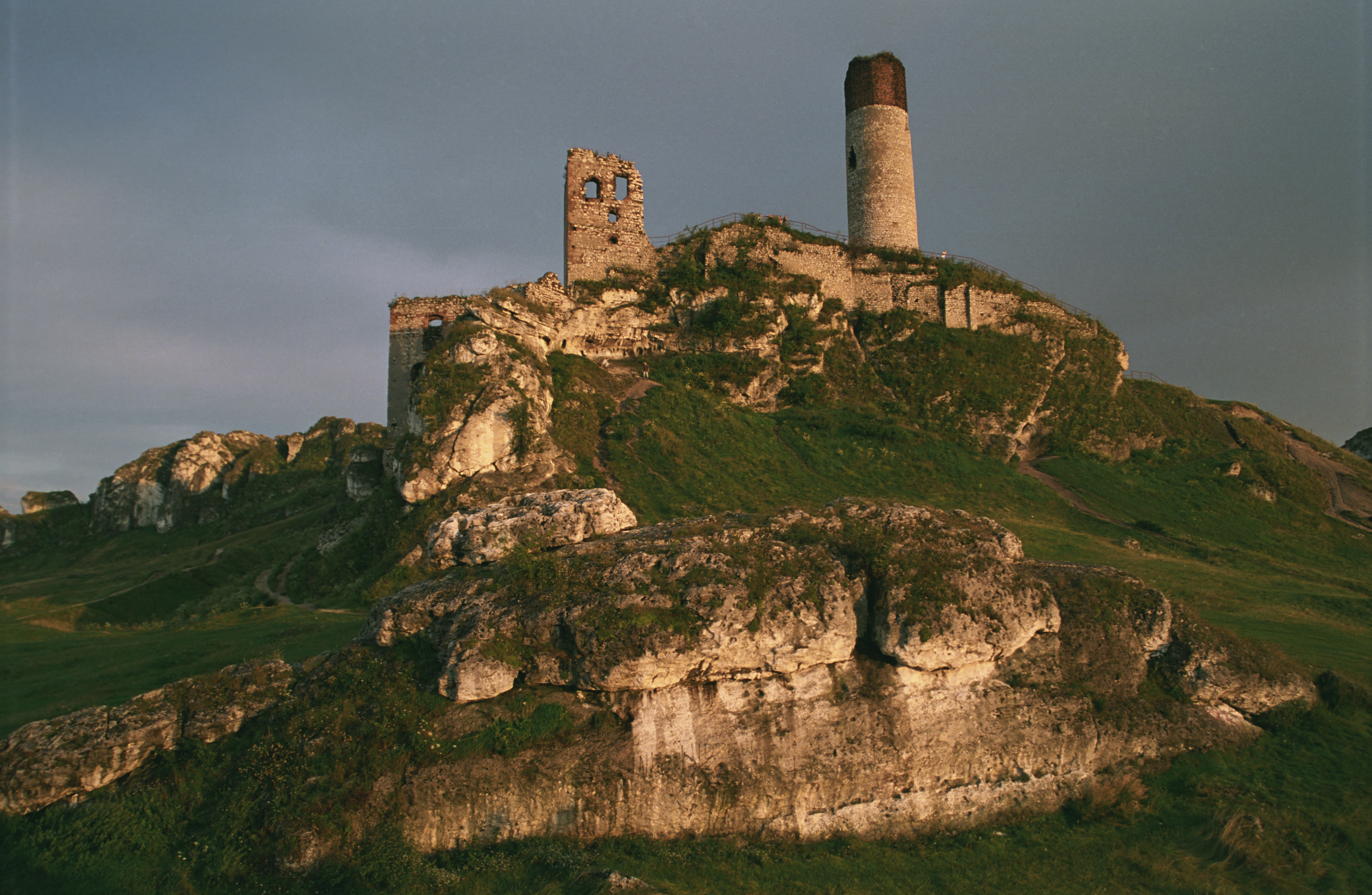
Olsztyn Castle

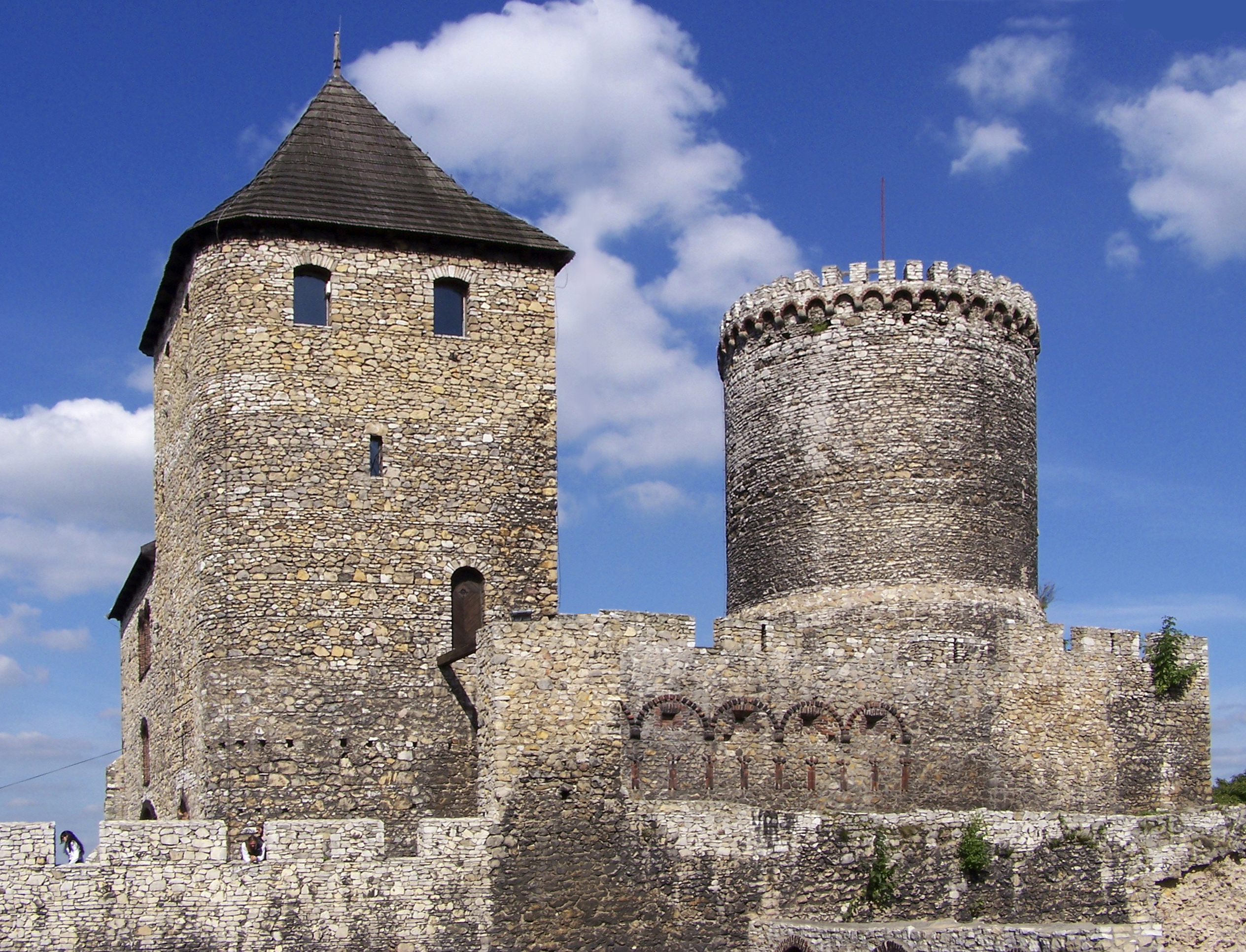
Będzin Castle

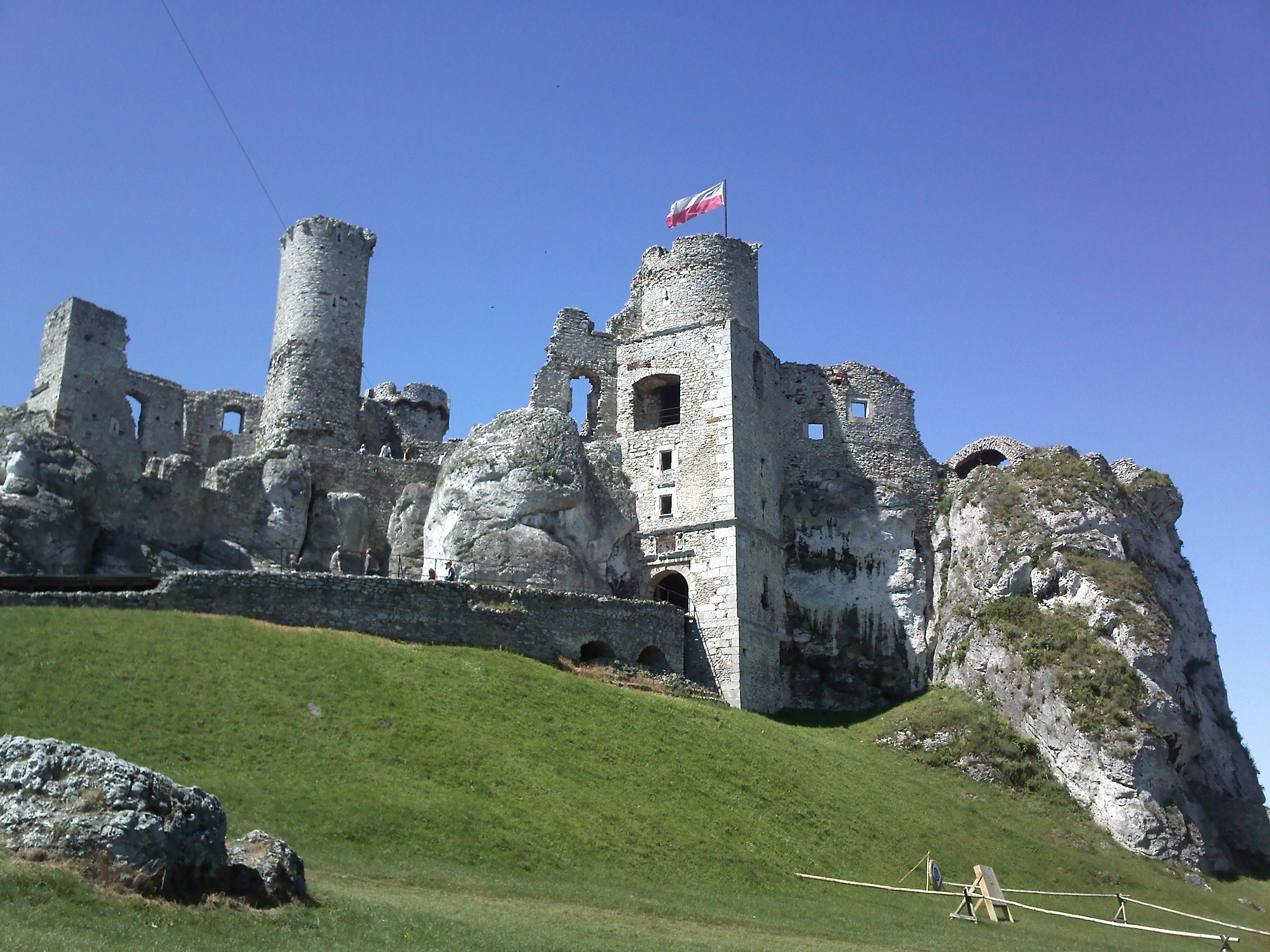
Ogrodzieniec Castle

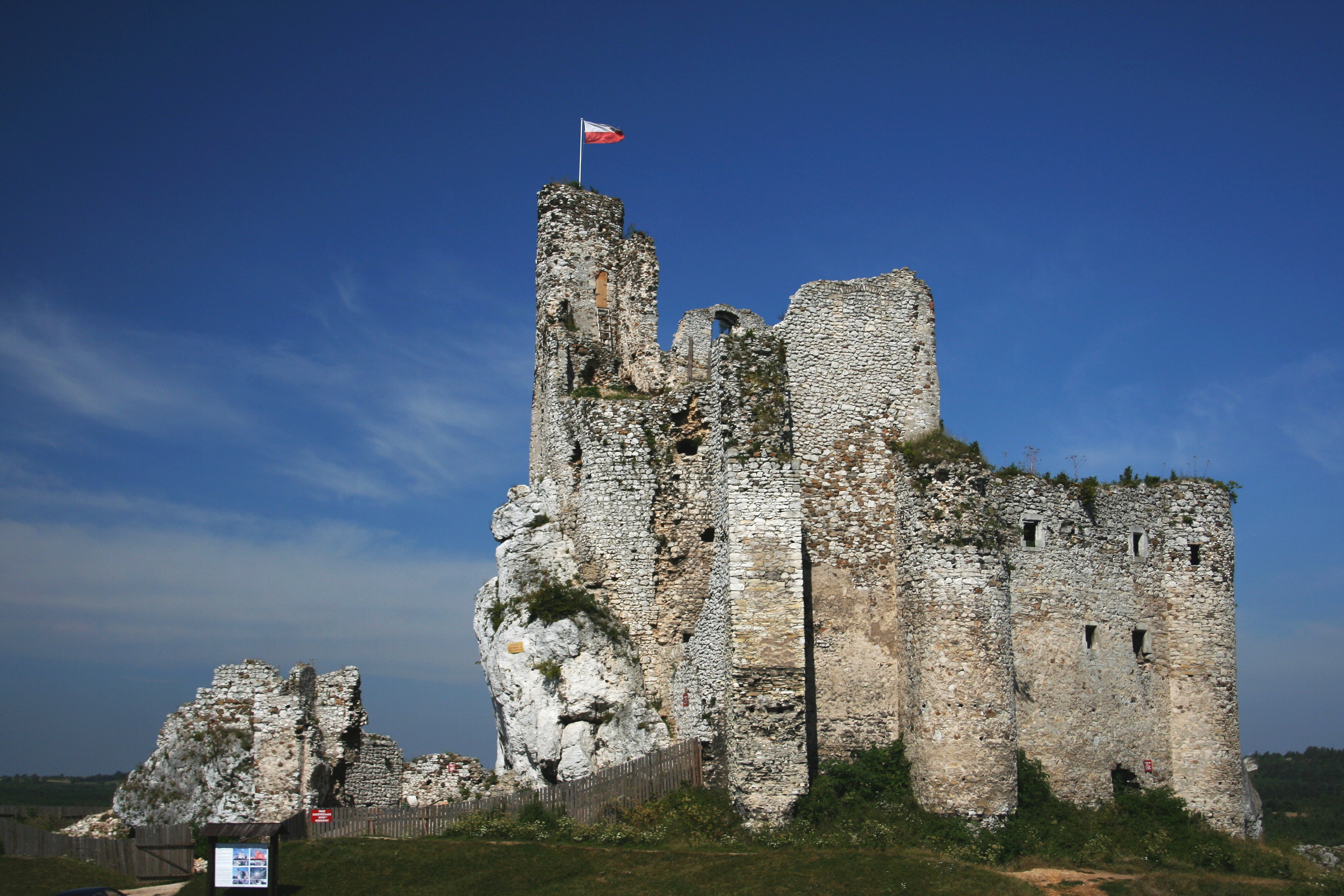
Mirów Castle

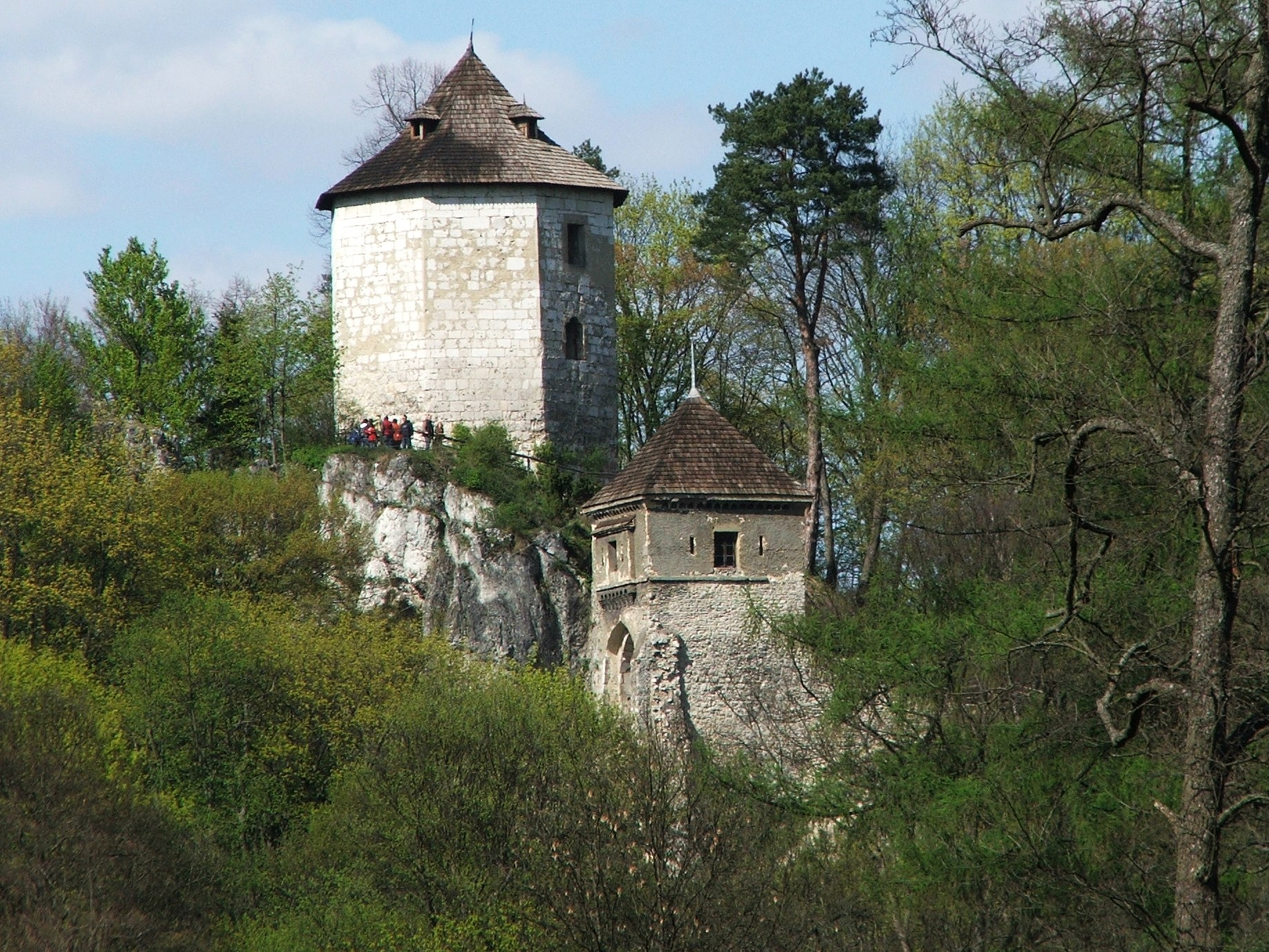
Ojców Castle

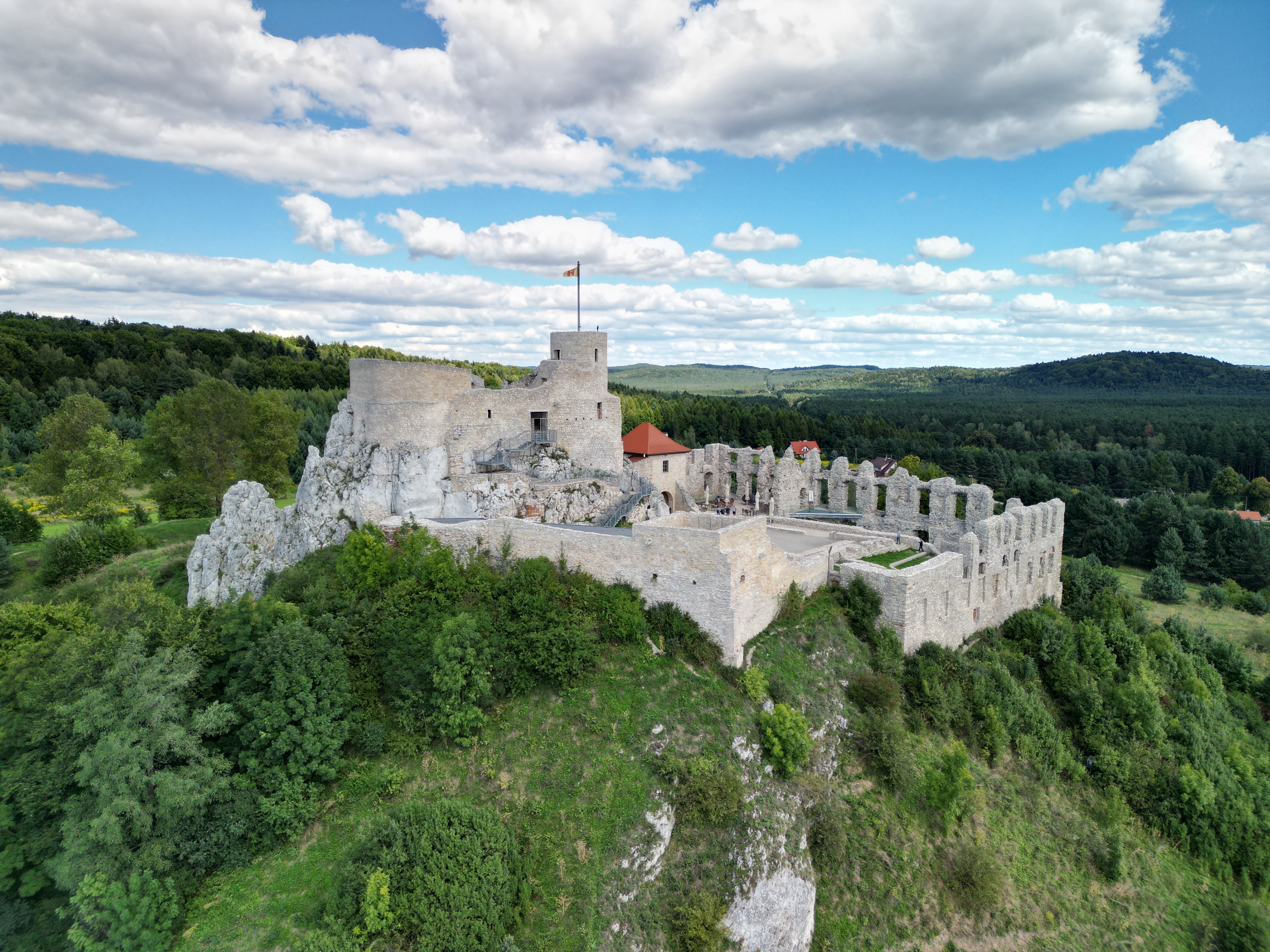
Rabsztyn Castle

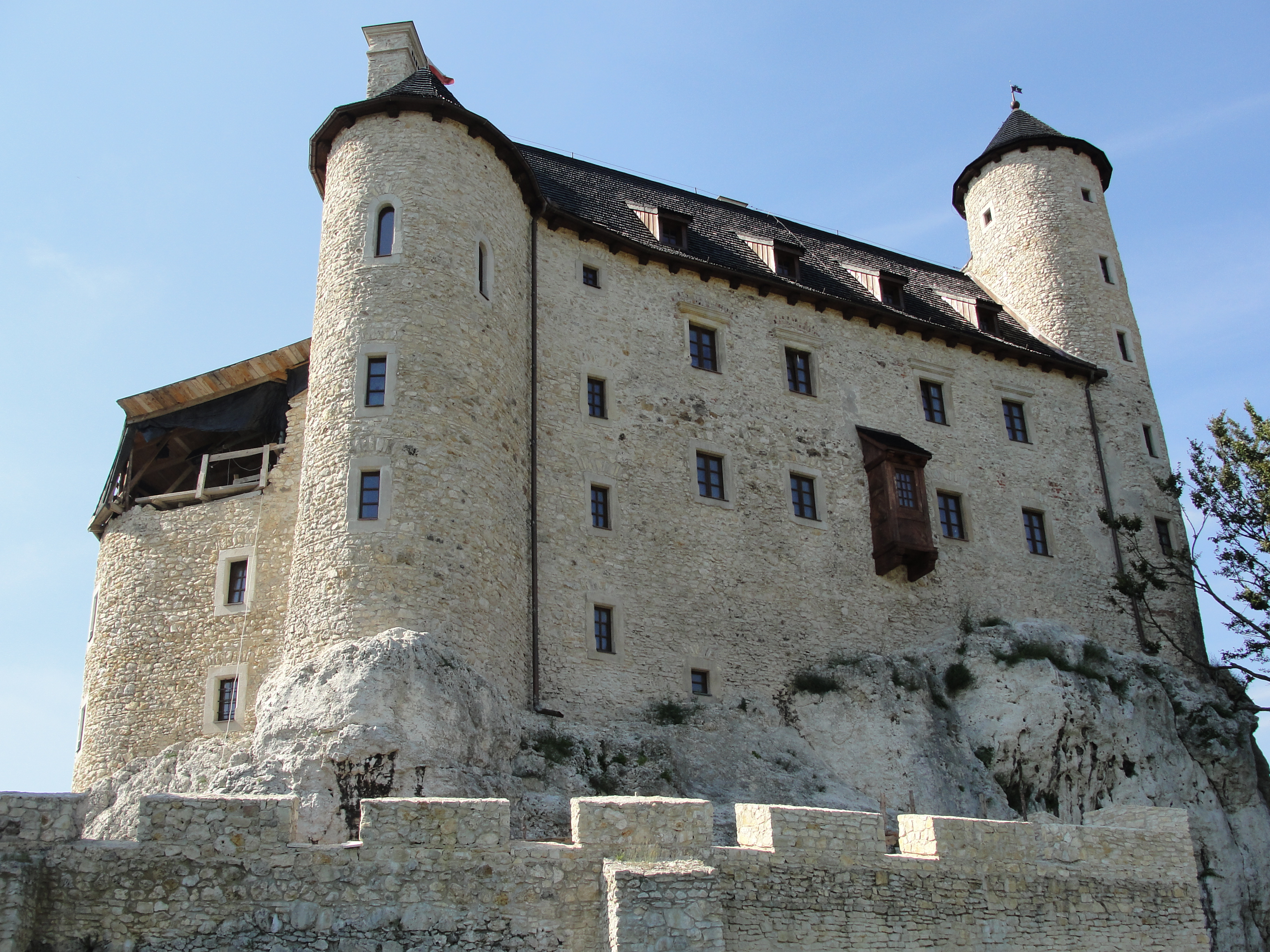
Bobolice Castle

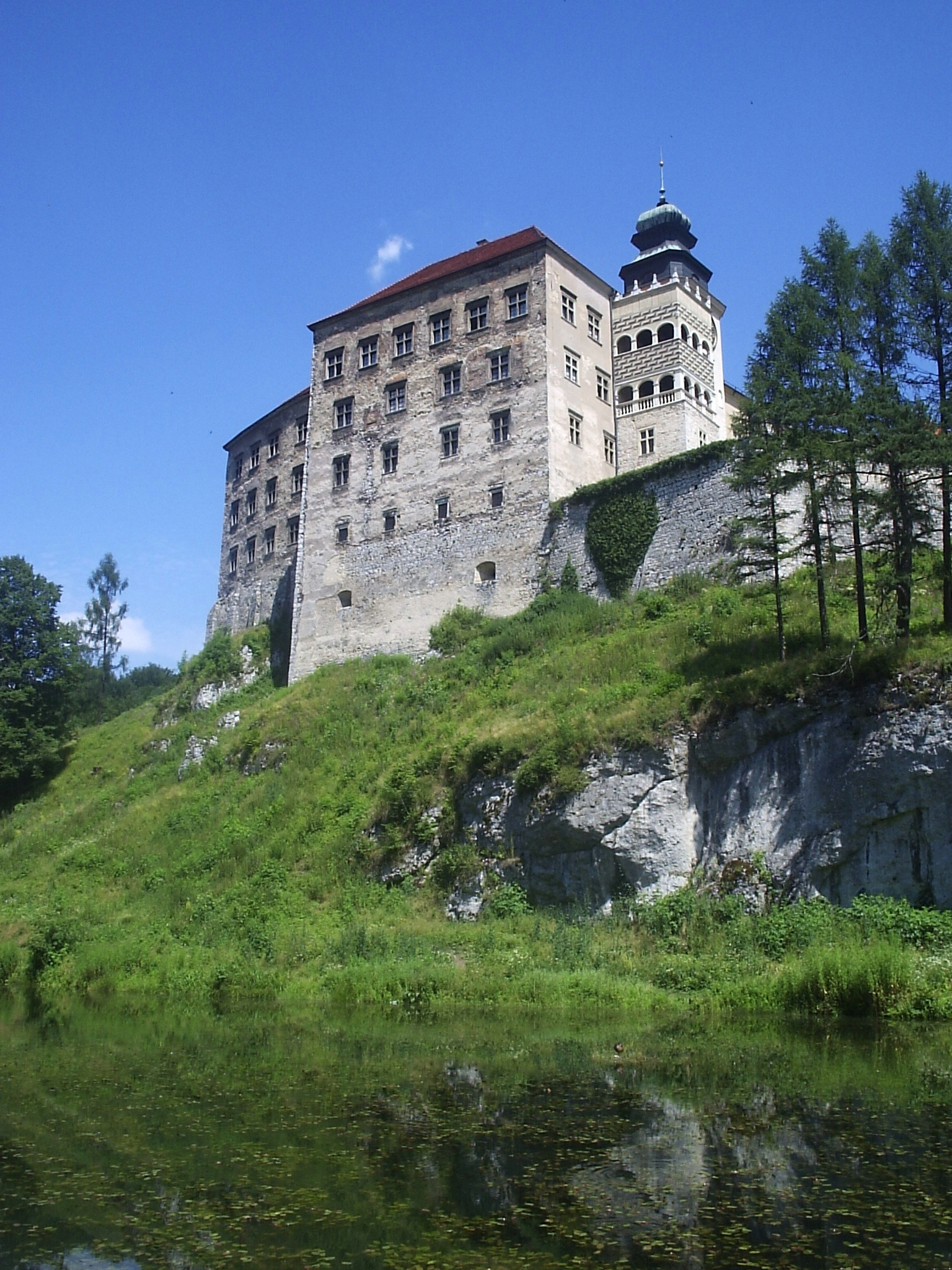
Pieskowa Skała Castle

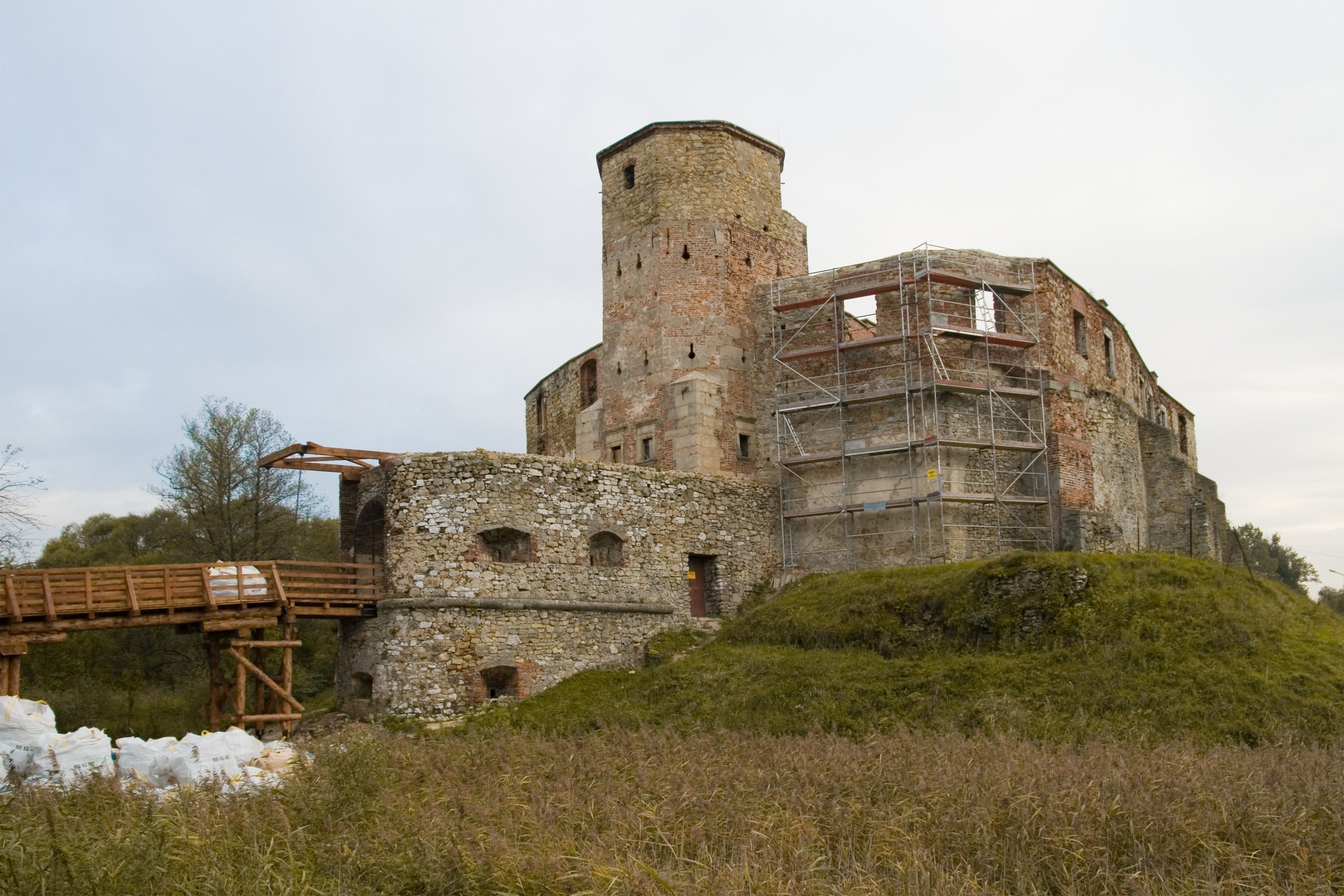
Siewierz Castle

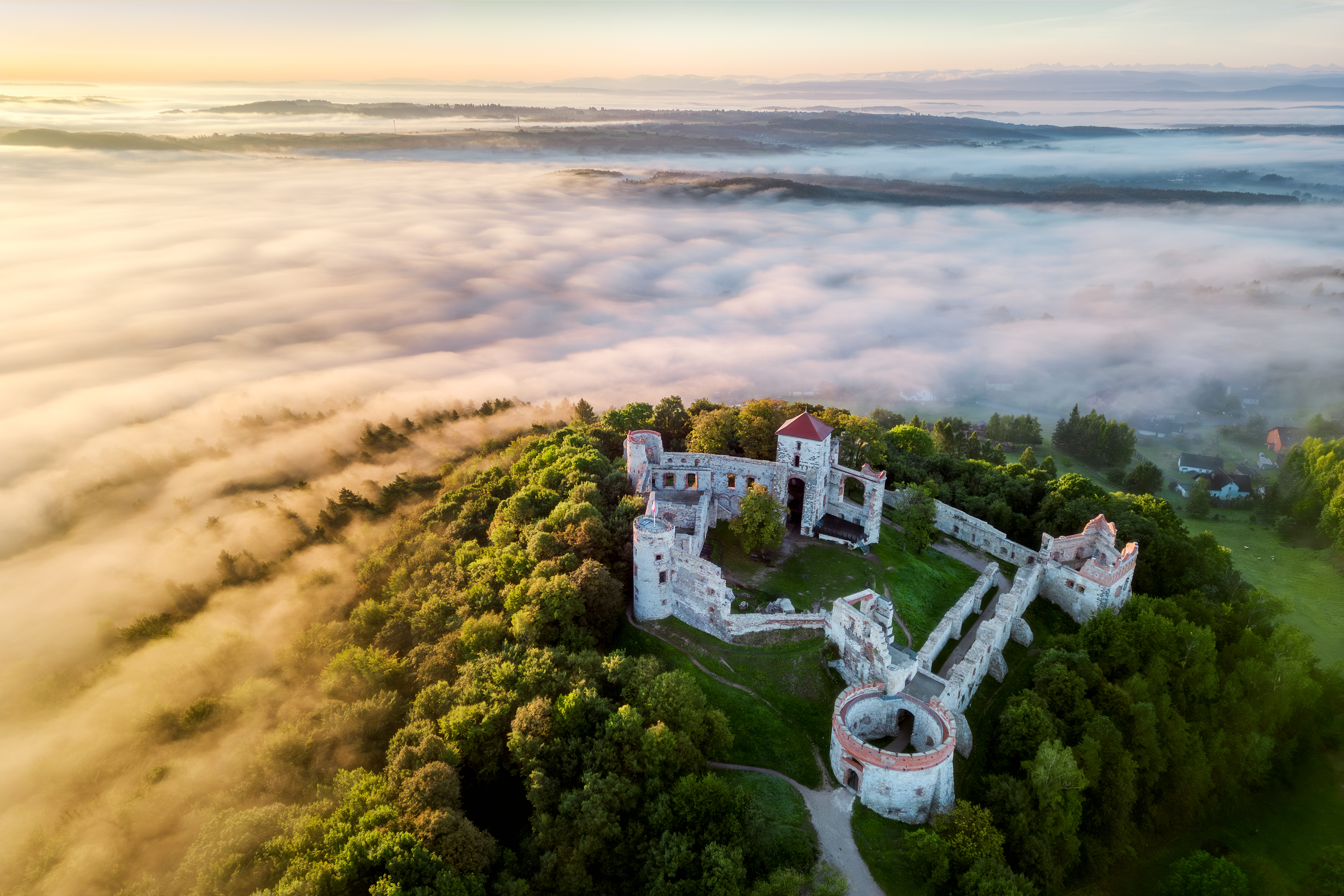
Tenczyn Castle

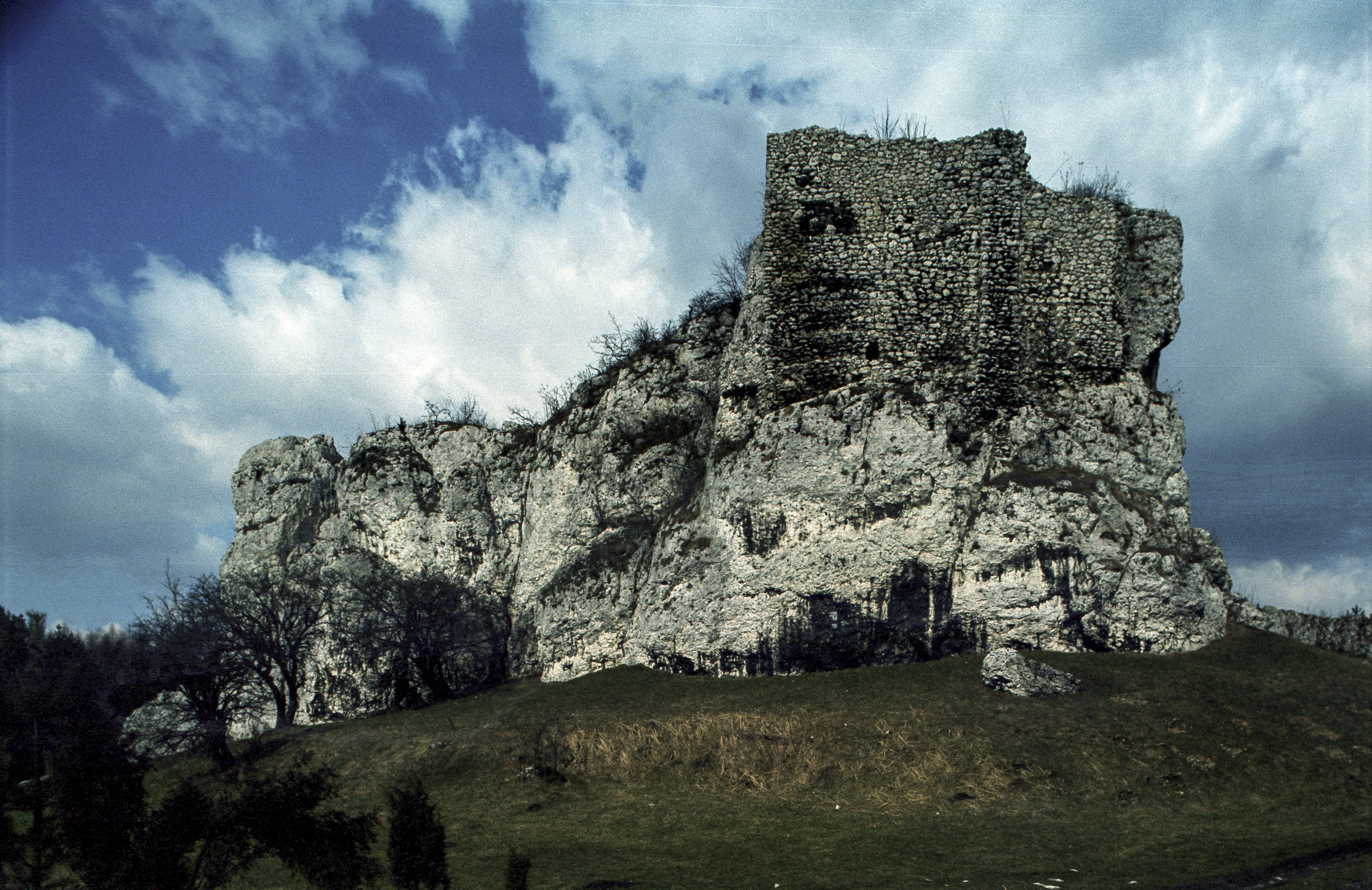
Przewodziszowice Castle

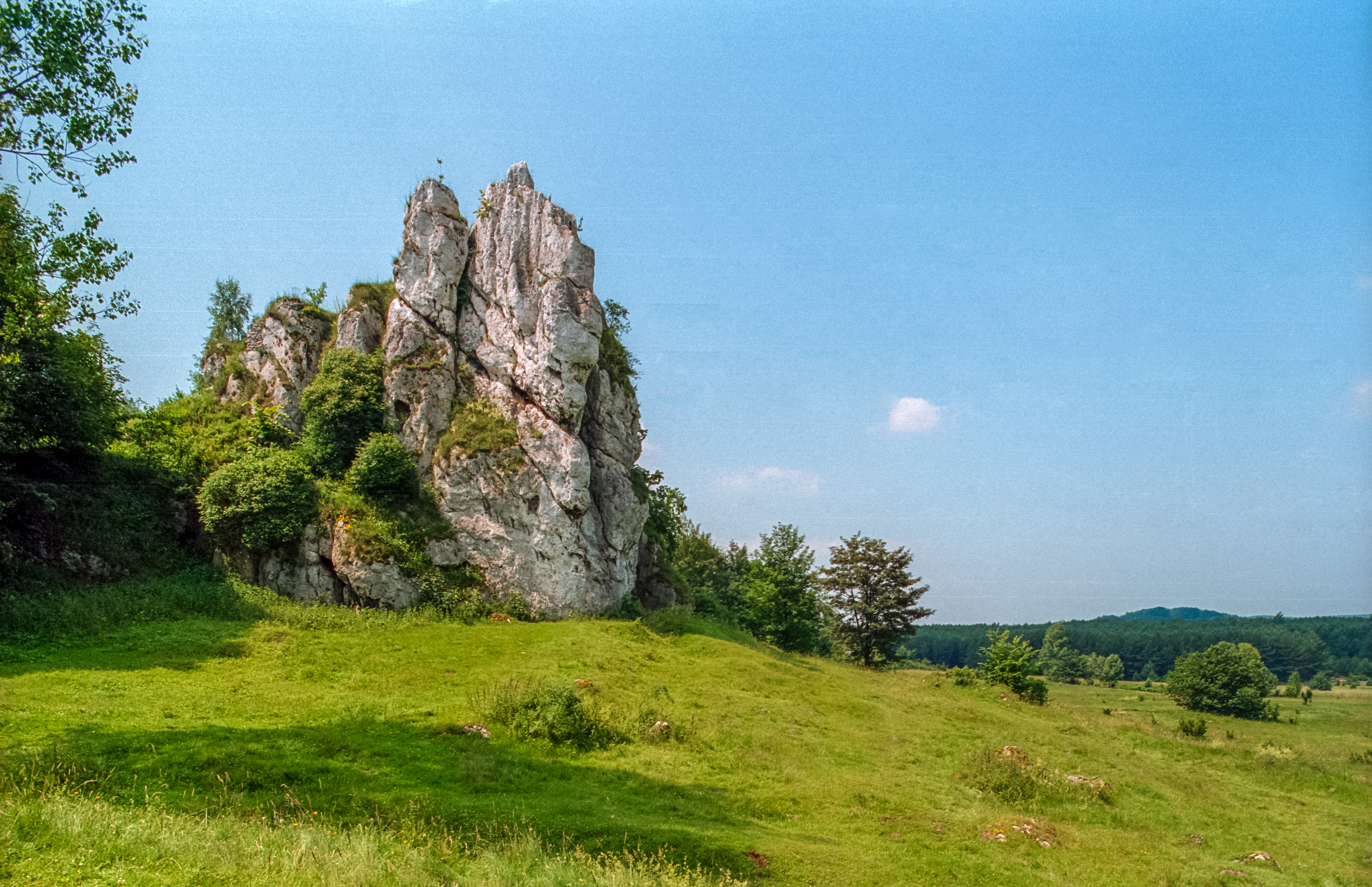
Łutowiec Castle

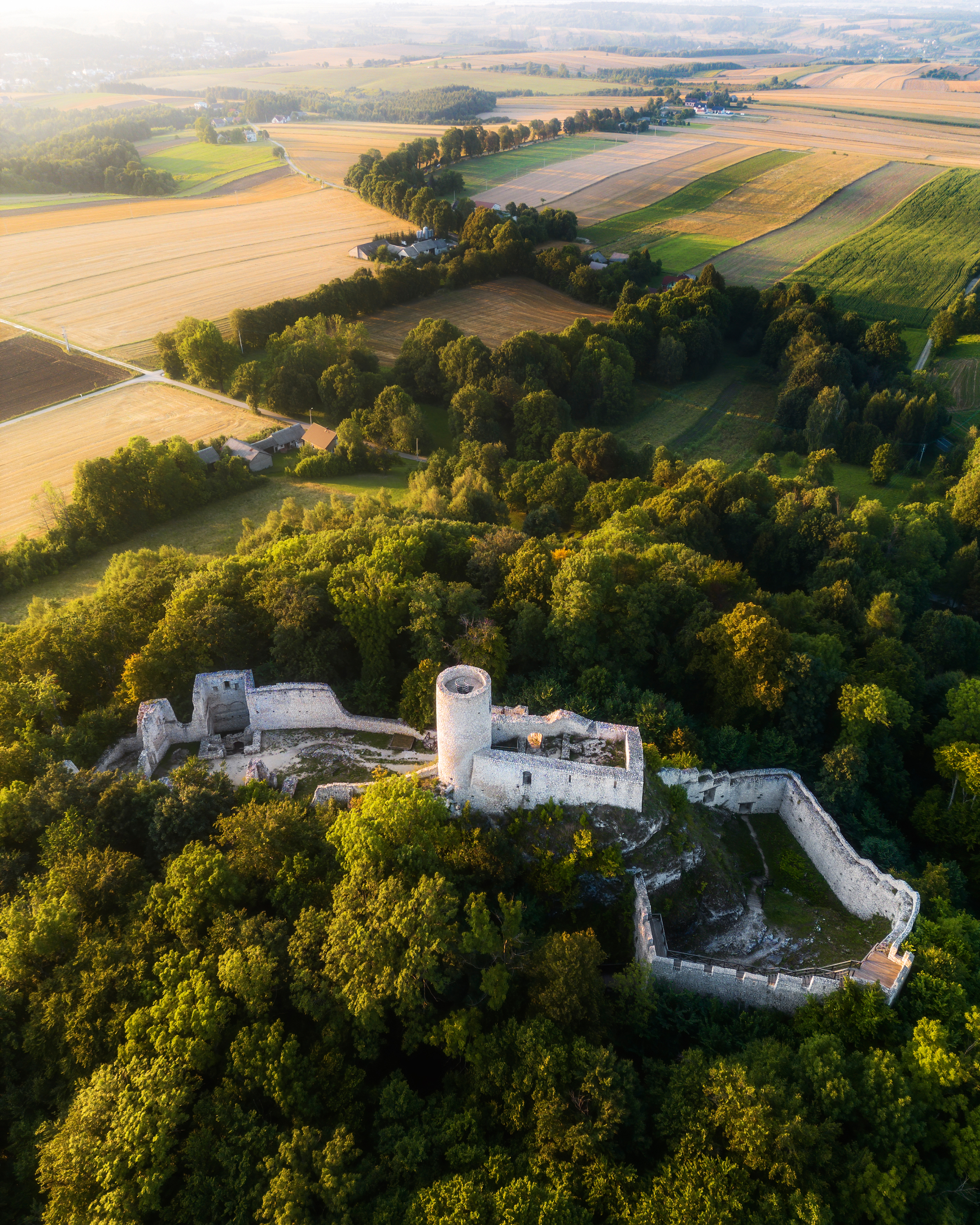
Smoleń Castle

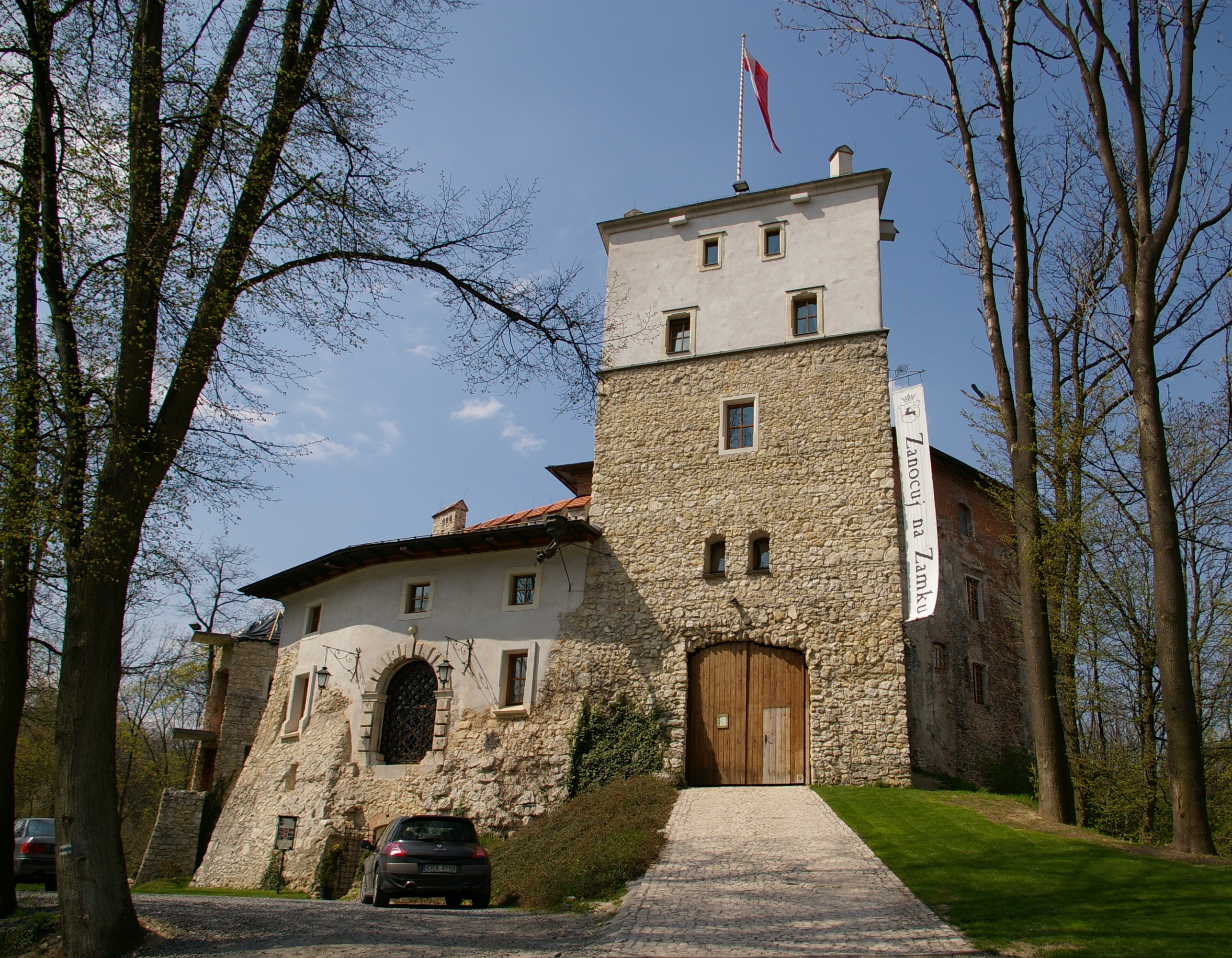
Korzkiew Castle

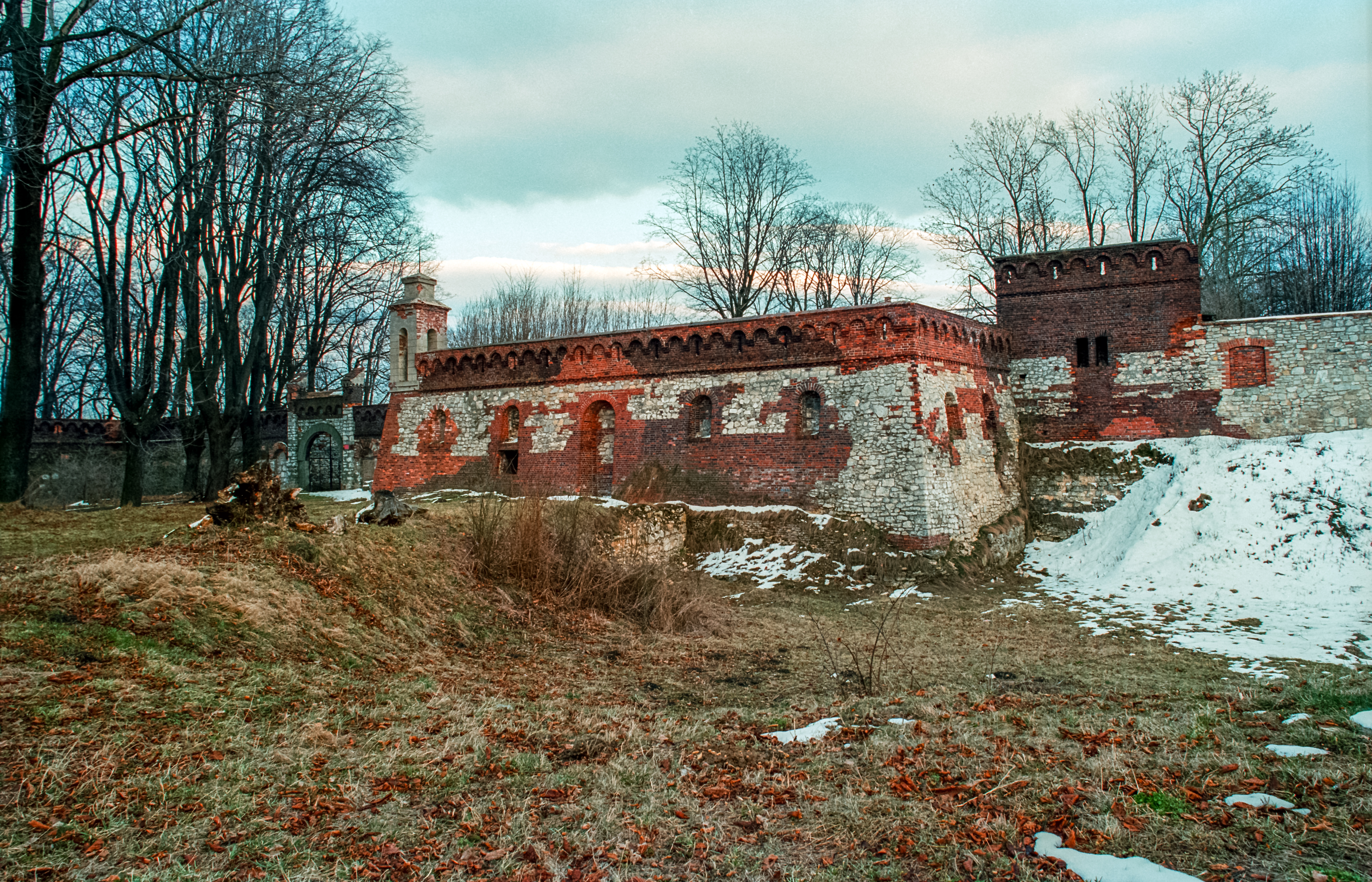
Pilica Castle

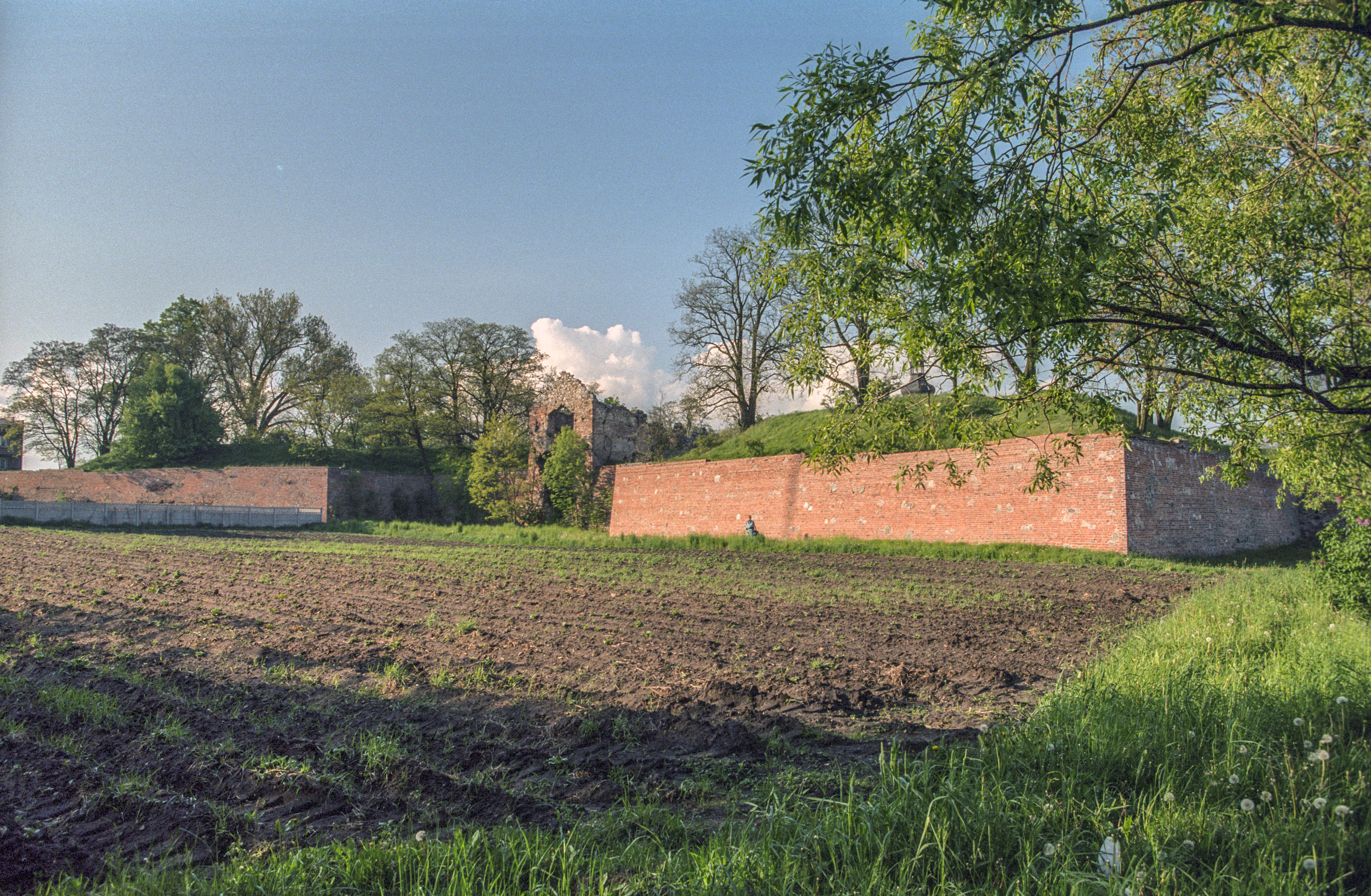
Danków Castle

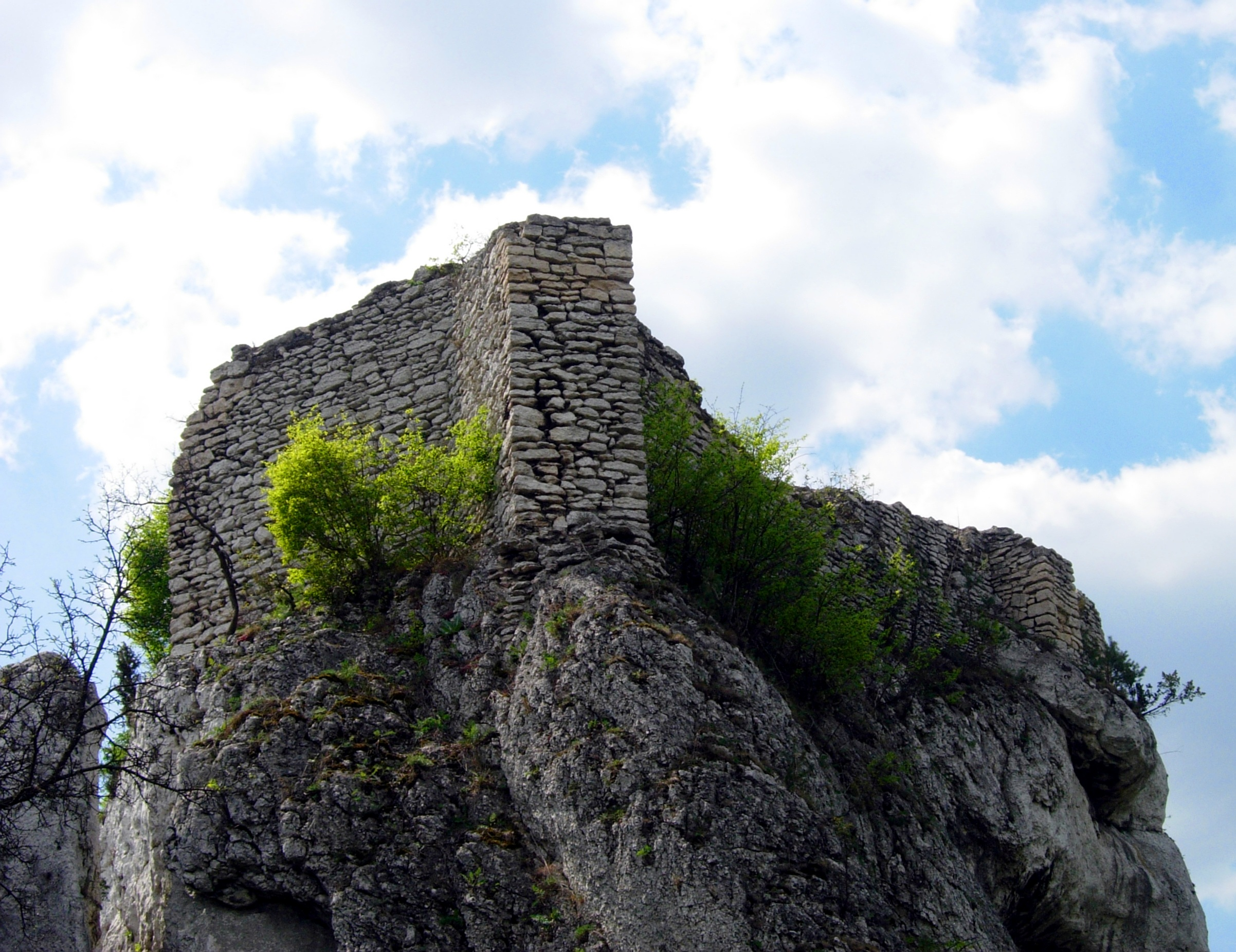
Ryczów Castle

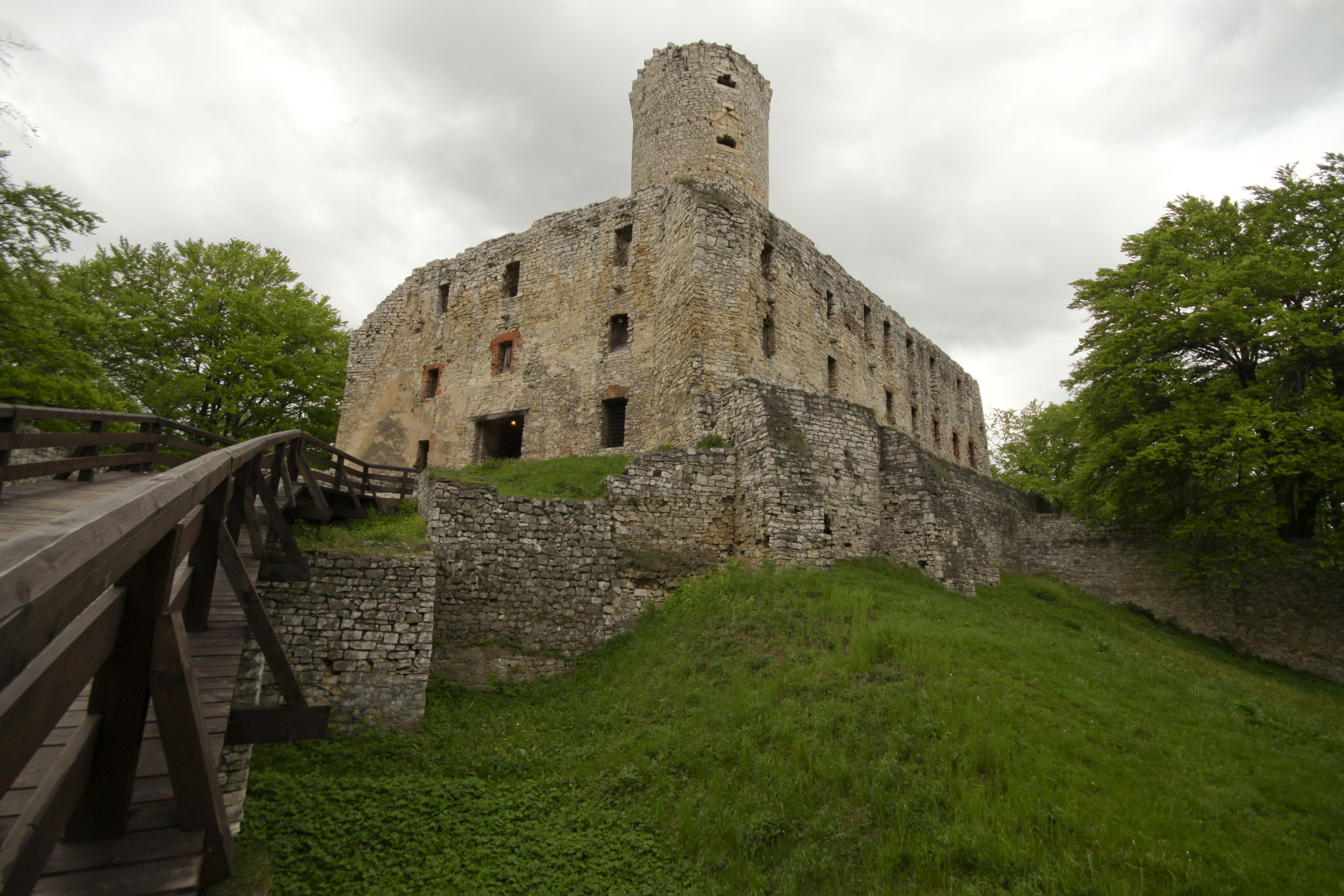
Lipowiec Castle, Babice

Note: the photos above may include structures located just outside the marked Trail of the Eagles' Nests.

== See also ==
- Dunajec river castles
