= Korzkiew =

- Village
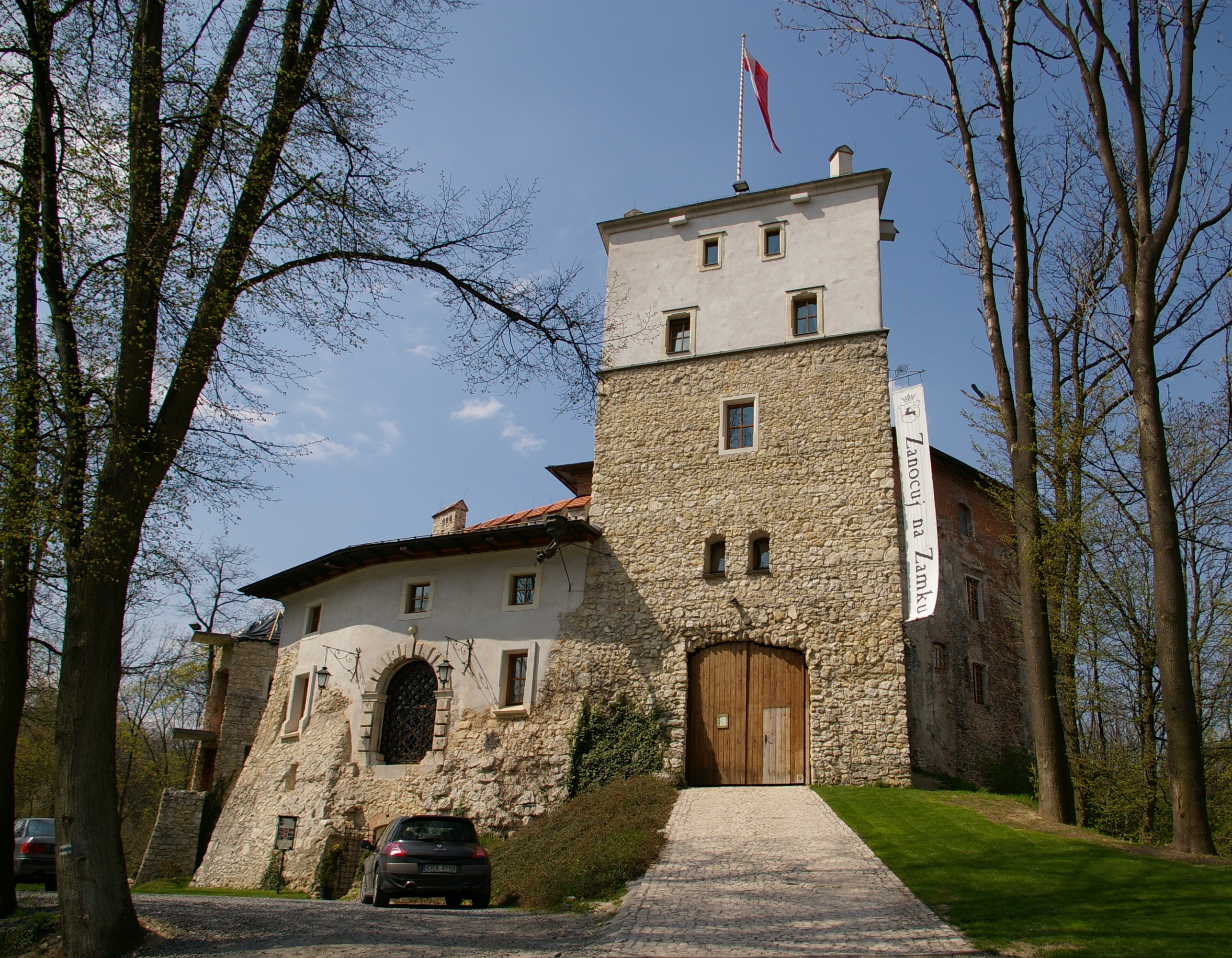
- Korzkiew Castle

- Location within Poland
- Coordinates: 50°9′48″N 19°52′49″E
- Country: Poland
- Voivodeship: Lesser Poland
- County: Kraków
- Gmina: Zielonki

Population
  - Total: 170

Korzkiew [ˈkɔʂkʲɛf] is a village in the administrative district of Gmina Zielonki, within Kraków County, Lesser Poland Voivodeship, in southern Poland.

The Korzkiew Castle was part of the Szlak Orlich Gniazd "Trail of the Eagle's Nests", one of a chain of 14th century (reign of King Casimir) medieval castles that protected the northwestern border of royal Krakow that went all the way to Czestochowa. The castle, Zamek Korzkiew, was restored and currently houses a boutique hotel and a conference center-banquet hall.
