= Bąkowiec Castle =

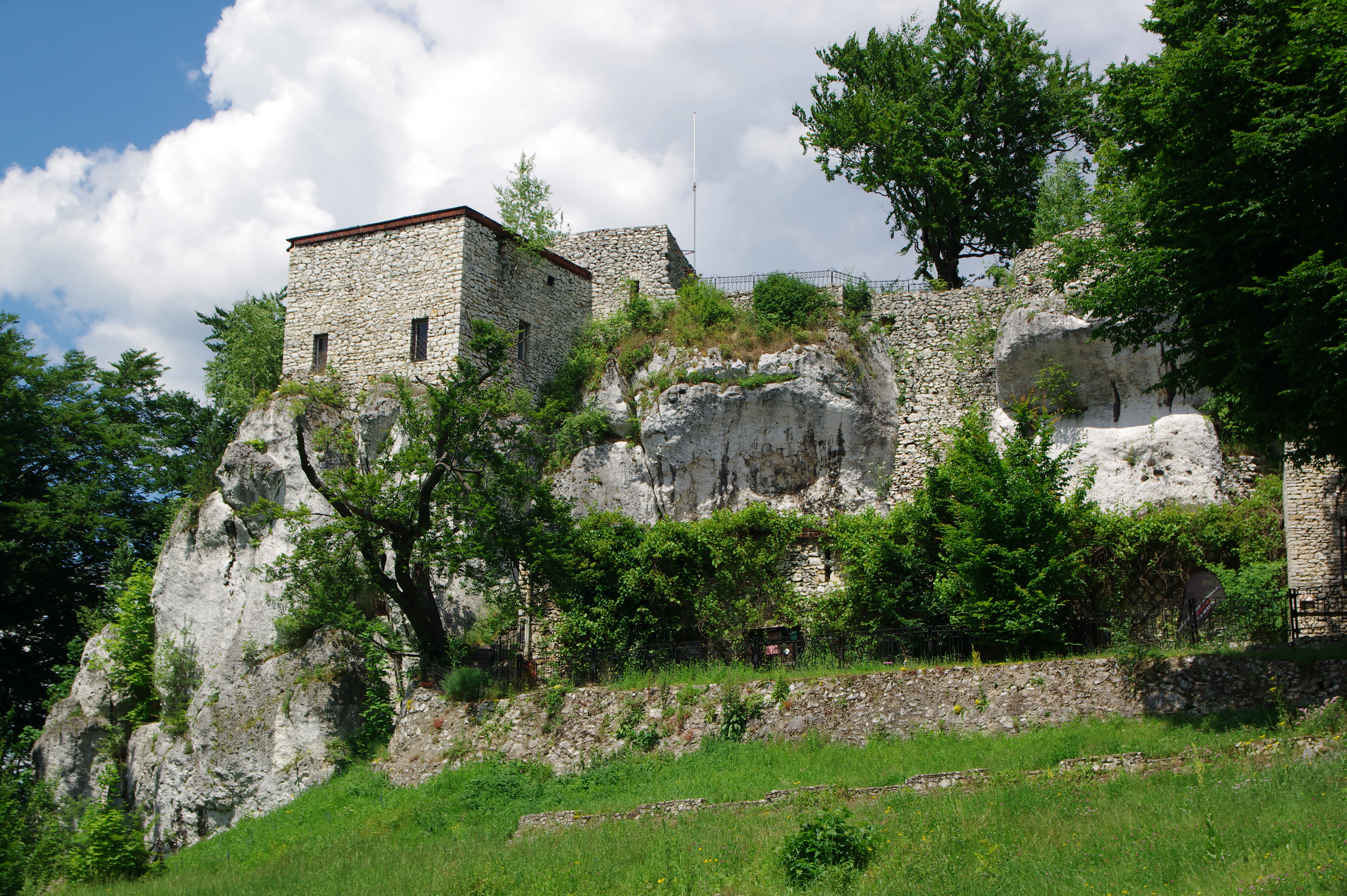
- Bąkowiec Castle in Morsko

- Location of the Bąkowiec Castle in Poland
- 50°33′02″N 19°31′14″E
- Location: Morsko, Silesian Voivodeship, in Poland

History
- Built: 13-14th century

Site notes
- Architectural style: Romanesque

Bąkowiec Castle is a fourteenth-century knight's castle ruins, located in the Kraków-Częstochowa Upland. The fortress was built as part of the Trail of the Eagles' Nests defence system, located in the village of Morsko, Silesian Voivodeship in Poland.

== History ==
Its founders may have been the Morscy knights of the Topór coat of arms, Casimir the Great, the Koziegłowski family of the Lis coat of arms or nobleman Władysław Opolczyk, who held the castle in 1370-1390. The watchtower, which was initially extended over time, was first mentioned in 1389 as the seat of the castle chaplain. In 1391, it was captured by the army of Władyslaw Jagiełło during the battle with Opolczyk, and then passed into the hands of various families, including the Giebułtowski, Włodek, Zborowski and Brzeski families. From the 17th century onwards, the castle fell into disrepair, and in the 20th century measures were taken to influence its present appearance — including reconstruction by the architect Witold Czeczott in the 1930s and the adaptation of the grounds into a holiday resort after 1967. Today, the castle ruins are part of the private Morsko Plus Leisure Centre, which underwent a partial revitalisation after 2015. In 2020, the entire resort was put up for sale.

== See also ==
- Castles in Poland
