= Lipowiec Castle =

Kraków Bishops castle in the Polish Jura, southern Poland

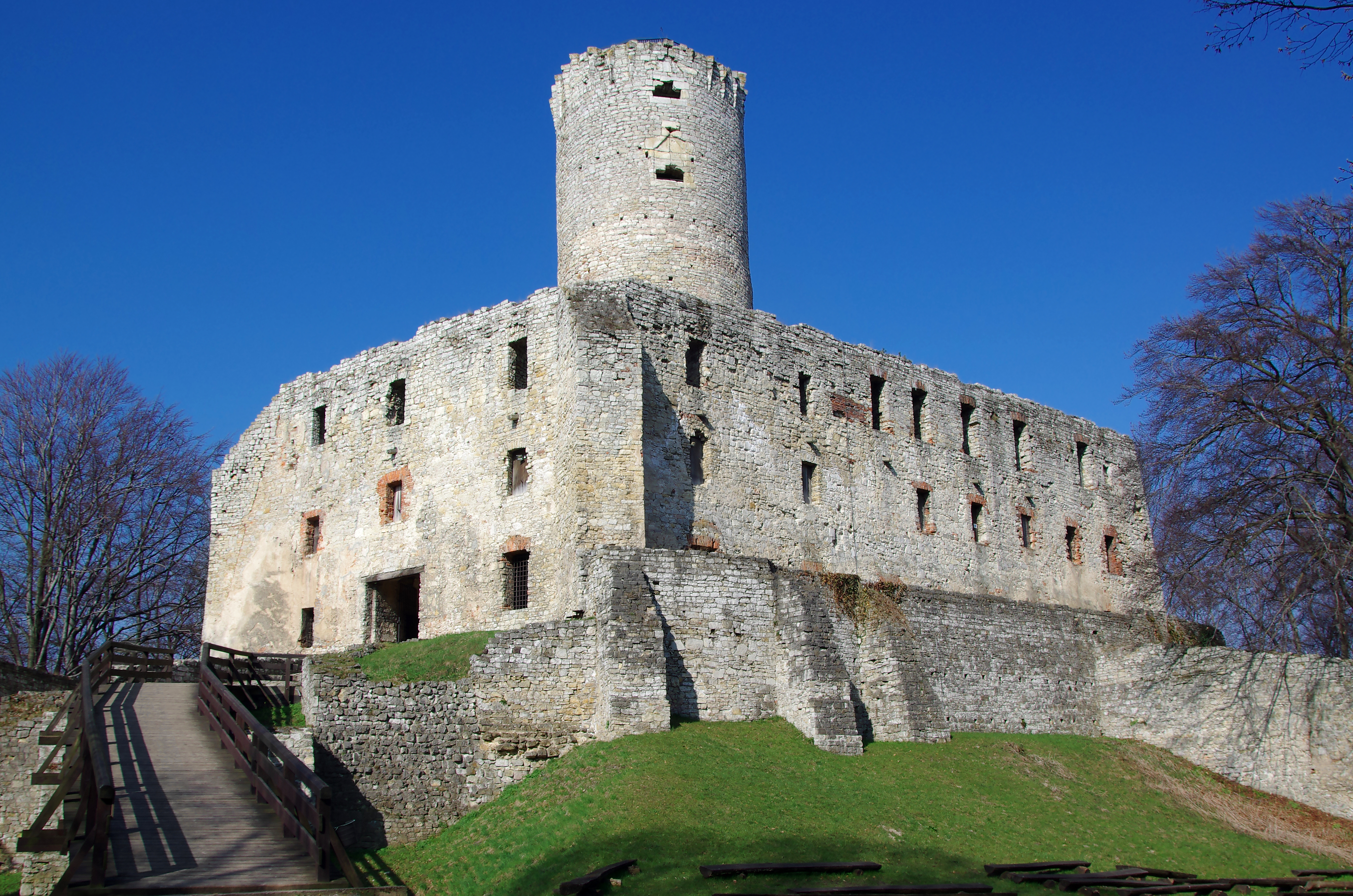
- Interactive map of the Lipowiec Castle area

General information
- Architectural style: Polish Gothic
- Location: Babice, Chrzanów County, Poland
- Coordinates: 50.0769°N 19.4447°E
- Construction started: 13th century

Lipowiec Castle is a ruin of the Kraków Bishops castle in the Polish Jura, near Babice village in Chrzanów County, Lesser Poland Voivodeship, in southern Poland.

== History ==
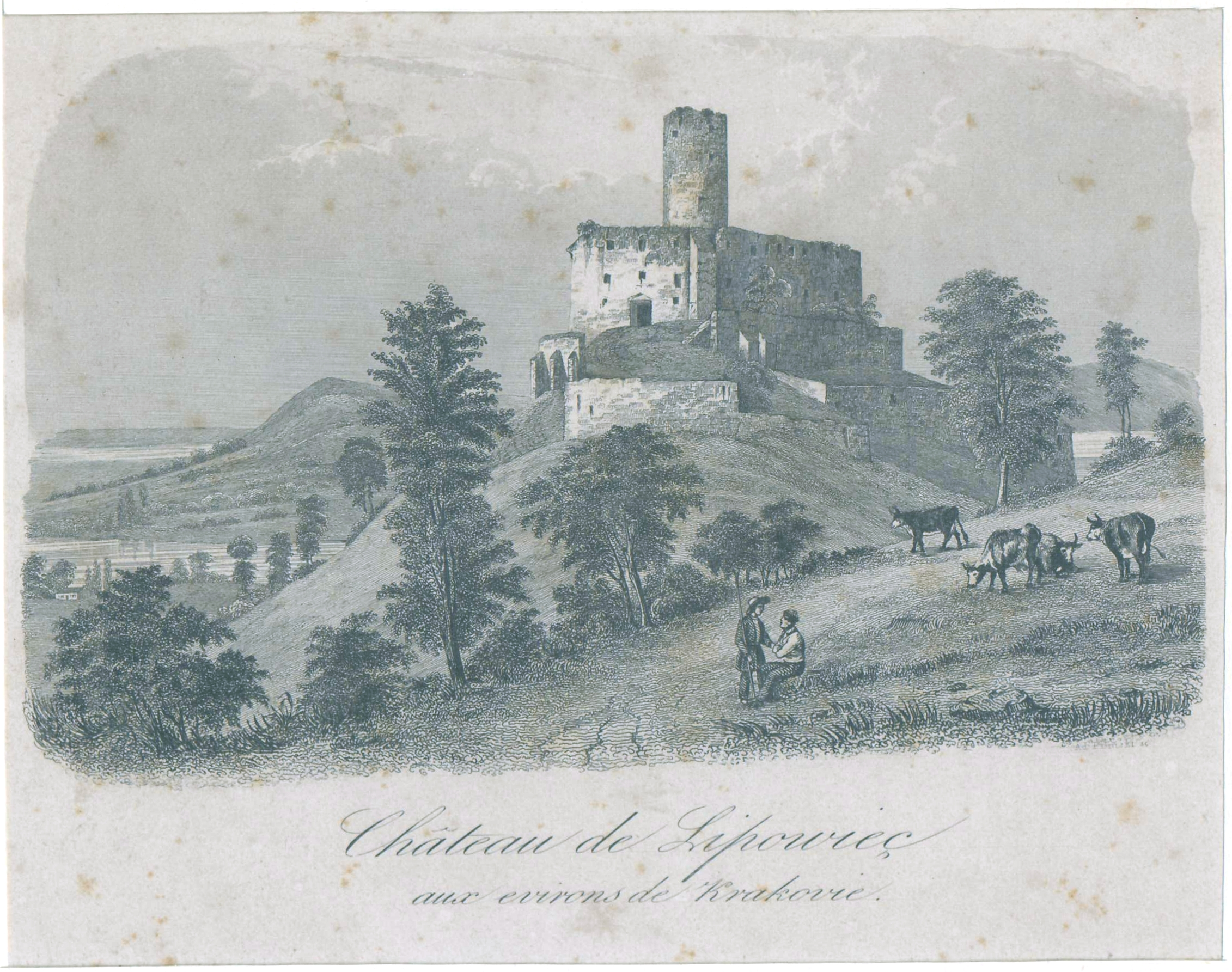
19th century drawing of the ruins

The castle was first mentioned in the 13th century when it was bought by Kraków bishop Prandota. In 1295 the castle belonged to bishop Jan Muskata. In his times the original foundation was significantly developed. The first stone structures were built.

The castle's present shape was developed in the 15th century by Wojciech Jastrzębiec (1412-1423) and Zbigniew Oleśnicki (1423-1451). Since the late 15th century the castle was used as a prison for ecclesiastical offenders.

The decline of the castle dates to a fire in 1629, and Swedish deluge when it was burned again in 1655/1657.

In 1789 after the death of Kraków Bishop Kajetan Sołtyk and after the partition of Poland the castle belonged to Emperor Joseph II. In 1800 fire destroyed most of the buildings. Since then the castle stayed inhabited. During the January Uprising 1863 the troops of general Marian Langiewicz sheltered in the castle.

== See also ==
- Castles in Poland
