= Ostrężnik =

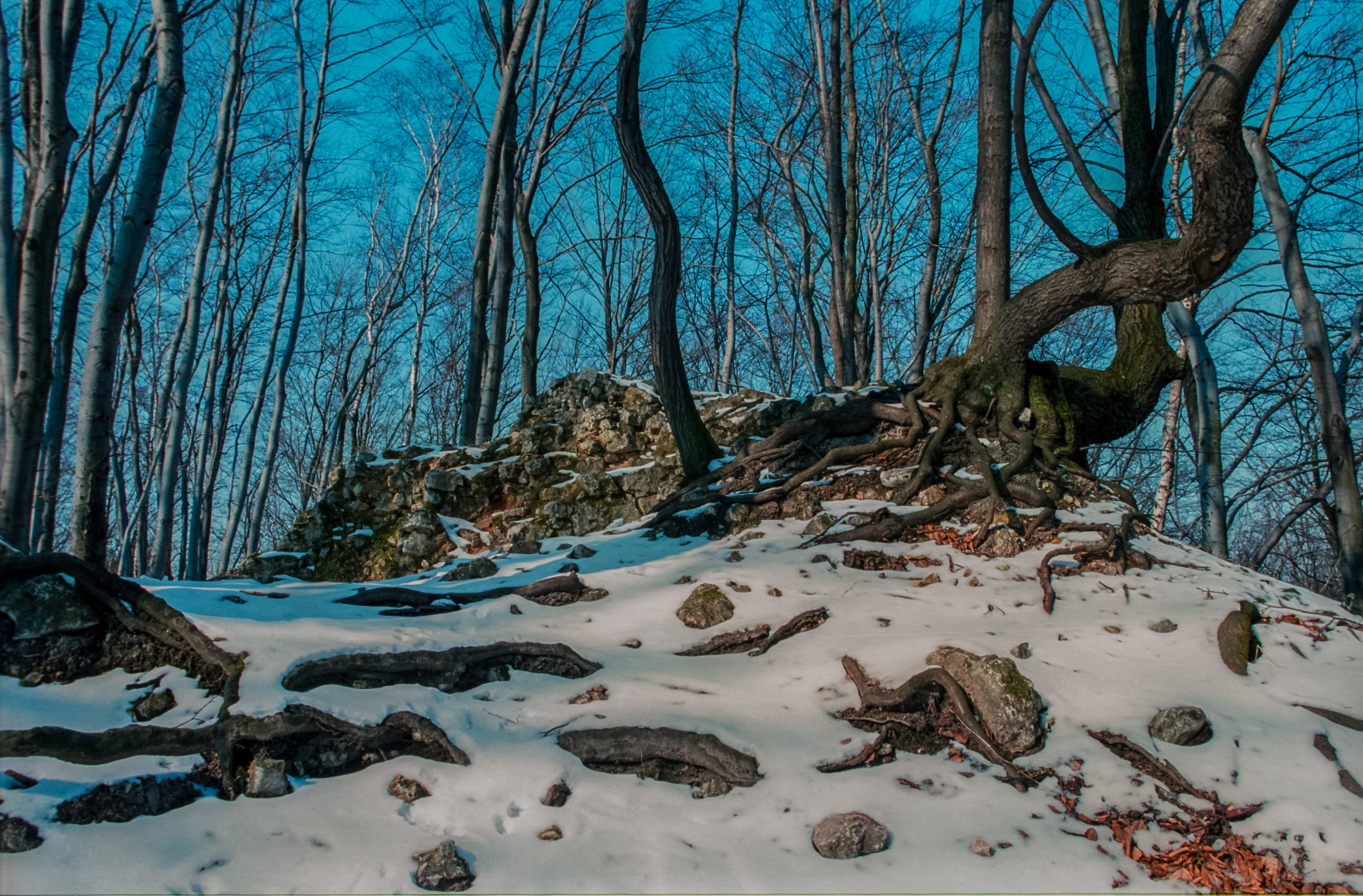
- Ruins of Ostrężnik Castle in winter

- Location within Poland
- Coordinates: 50°40′35″N 19°24′8.7″E
- Country: Poland
- Voivodeship: Silesian
- Gmina: Gmina Niegowa
- Established: 14th century
- Time zone: UTC+1 (CET)
  - Summer (DST): UTC+2 (CEST)
- Car plates: SKL

Ostrężnik [ɔstˈɛʲjnit͡s] is a Polish settlement in Gmina Niegowa near Trzebniów in Silesian Voivodeship, northwestern corner of Lesser Poland.

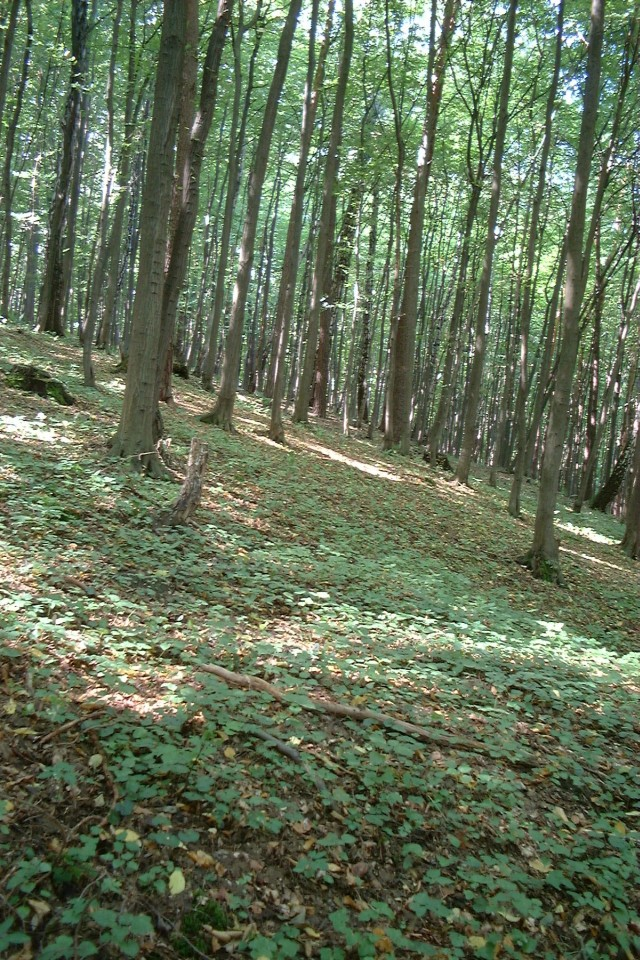
Ostrężnik Nature Reserve

== Location ==
The settlement consists of only several houses, nevertheless, it is known for the ruins of the Ostrężnik Castle (right) built in early 14th century, as well as the nature reserve (left) called Rezerwat przyrody Ostrężnik established in 1960 with the total area of 4.1 ha.

The Ostrężnik Castle was one of over 25 medieval castles built by the order of King Casimir III the Great on large, tall rocks of the Polish Jura Chain in order to protect the capital city of Kraków as well as important trading routes against the invaders. The series of castles named the Eagles' Nests (Polish: Orle Gniazda) form the Trail of the Eagles' Nests (Polish: Szlak Orlich Gniazd) of south-western Poland.

Ostrężnik is a popular destination for hiking trips, and mountain biking, with several marked trails.
