= Korzkiew Castle =

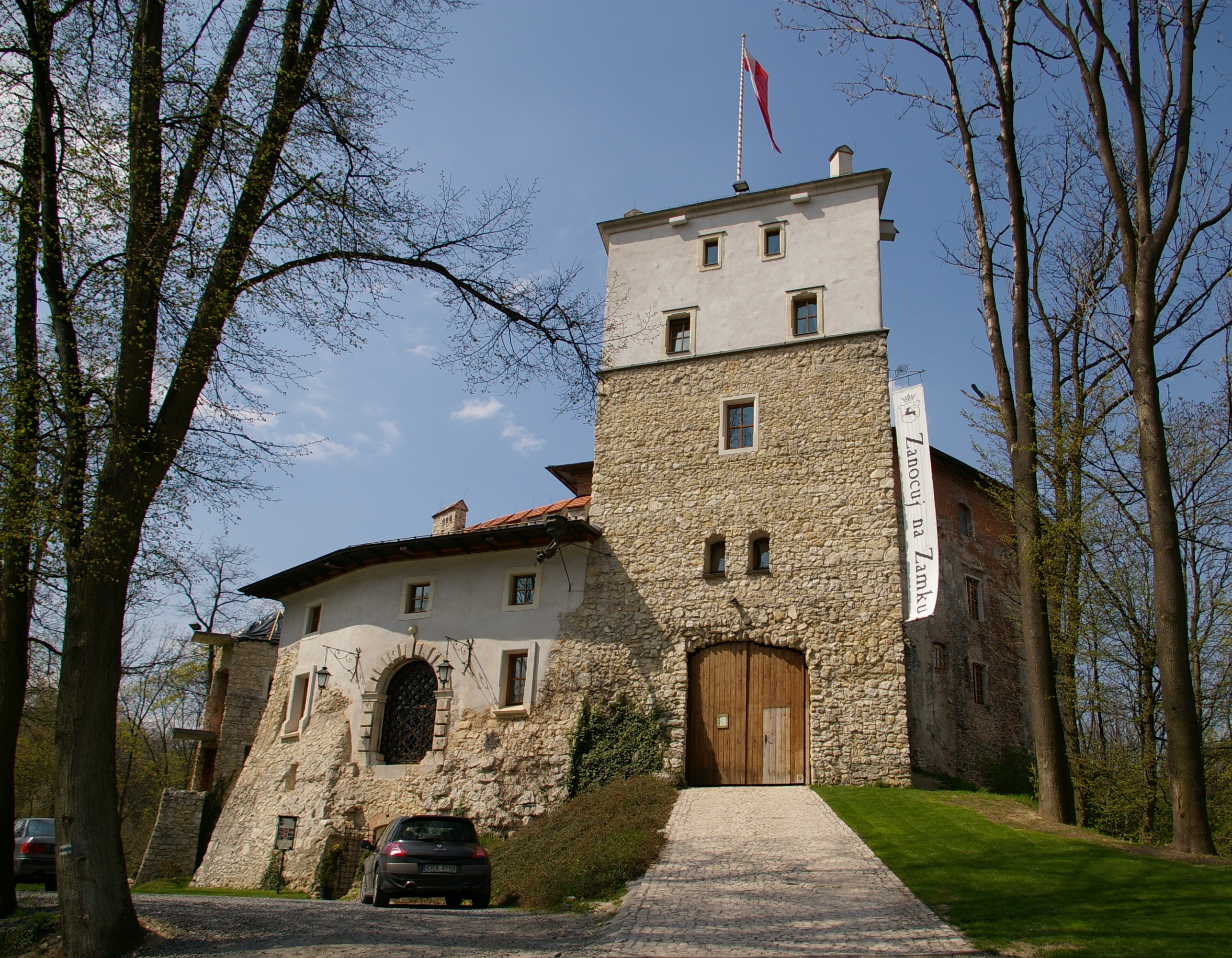
- Korzkiew Castle

- Location of the Korzkiew Castle in Poland
- 50°09′44″N 19°52′56″E
- Location: Korzkiew, Lesser Poland Voivodeship, Poland

History
- Built: 14th century

Site notes
- Architectural style: Romanesque

Korzkiew Castle is a fourteenth-century Romanesque castle located in Korzkiew, Lesser Poland Voivodeship in Poland. The castle is part of the Trail of the Eagles' Nests tourist route. The castle complex includes the castle ruins, housing residence, a grange and park, enlisted on the register of objects of cultural heritage of the Lesser Poland Voivodeship.

== History ==
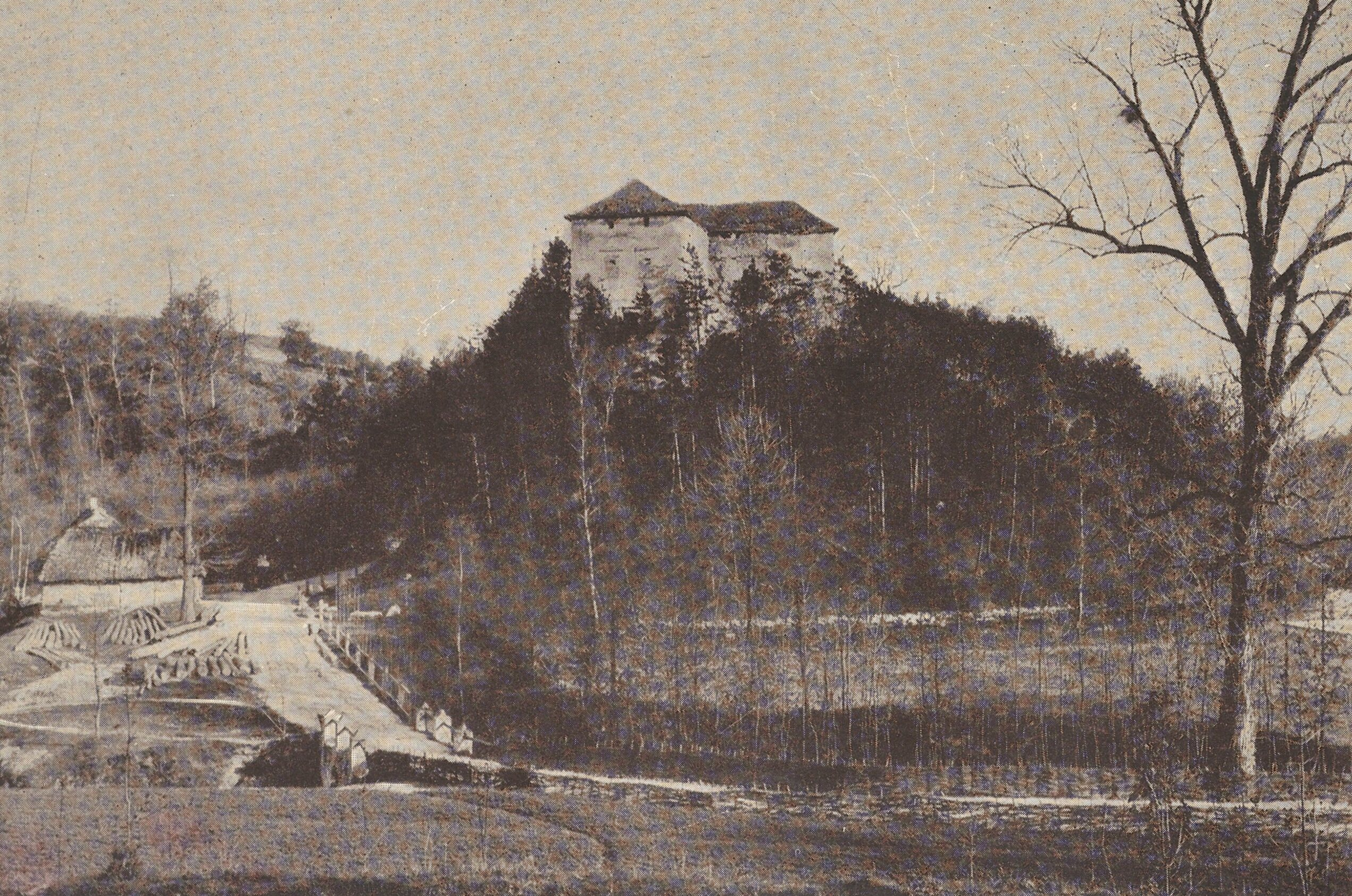
The castle before 1911

In 1352, Jan z Syrokomli bought the Korzkiew hill and built a rectangular, stone tower for defence and residency, which eventually became the castle. By the end of the fifteenth-century, as well as in 1720 (when the proprietors were the Jordanowie), the building was rebuilt. Then on, the castle was owned by the Wesslowie and Wodziccy. Towards the end of the nineteenth-century, the building fell into a state of ruin.

== Modern times ==
Since 1997, the castle has been owned by architect Jerzy Donimirski, that undertook renovation and reconstruction works of the castle, which presently serves as a hotel. The owner similarly plans to renovate the nearby manor house, ponds and build a small museum and an open-air museum.

== See also ==
- List of castles in Poland
