= Ryczów, Lesser Poland Voivodeship =

Ryczów
- Village
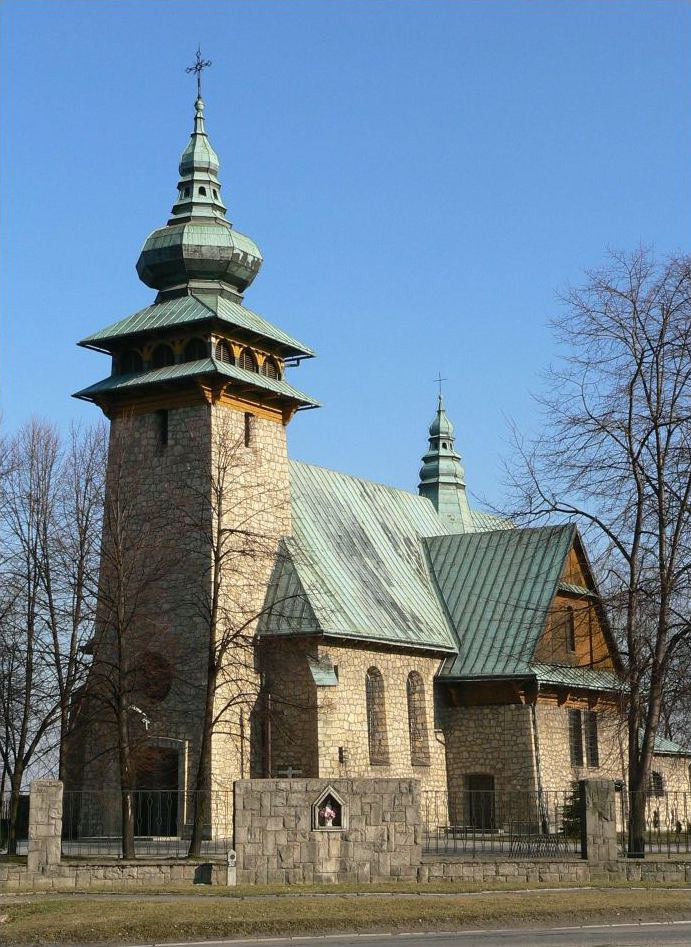
- Our Lady Queen of Poland church

- Coat of arms

- Location within Poland
- Coordinates: 49°59′N 19°33′E
- Country: Poland
- Voivodeship: Lesser Poland
- County: Wadowice
- Gmina: Spytkowice

Ryczów [ˈrɨt͡ʂuf] is a village in the administrative district of Gmina Spytkowice, within Wadowice County, Lesser Poland Voivodeship, in southern Poland.

The village was founded in the early 14th century by Cistercian monks from Kraków. A castle was also built in the 14th century, possibly as part of king Casimir III's border defense system. A Catholic parish was founded in 1436. Between 1945 and 1954 years the village was a seat of a separate gmina. In 1975–1999, it belonged to Bielsko-Biala Voivodeship

Ryczów is geographically subdivided into two parts. The southern part lies within the Wieliczka Foothills, whereas the northern part is in the valley of the Vistula River (Kraków Gate). The highest point of the village is about 345 m above sea level and the lowest is about 100 m below. Through the village runs the National Road No. 44 (Gliwice-Oświęcim-Skawina-Kraków) and the railway line Kraków-Oświęcim. At the northern end on the bank of the Vistula river lies the hamlet called Chałupki.

Ryczów has a kindergarten, a primary school and a gymnasium.
