= Łutowiec =

- Village
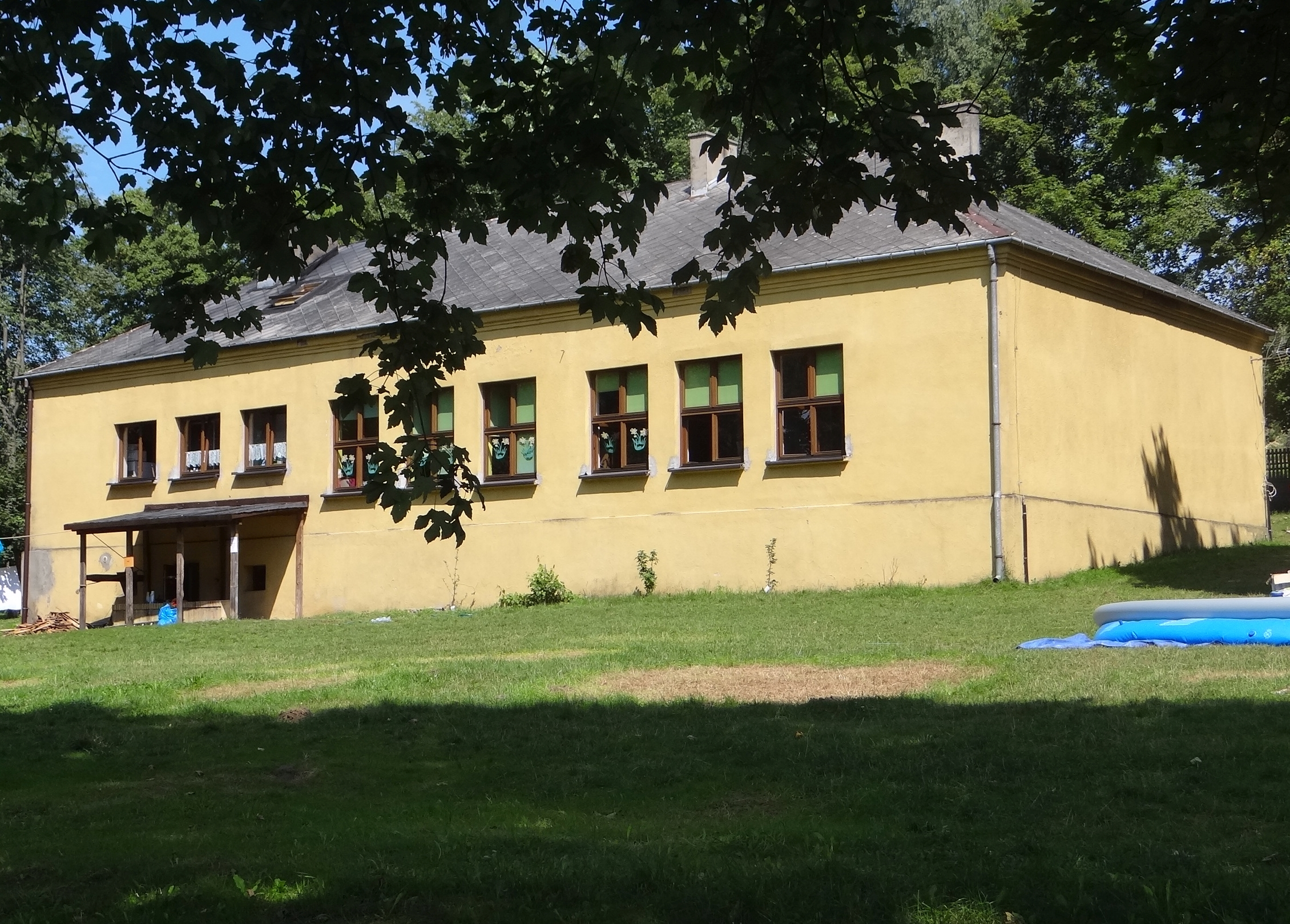
- School

- Location within Poland
- Coordinates: 50°37′40″N 19°27′5″E
- Country: Poland
- Voivodeship: Silesian
- County: Myszków
- Gmina: Niegowa
- Population (approx.): 100

Łutowiec [wuˈtɔvjɛt͡s] is a village in the administrative district of Gmina Niegowa, within Myszków County, Silesian Voivodeship, in southern Poland.
