= Siewierz Castle =

Castle in Poland

Castle of Cracow's Bishops in Siewierz
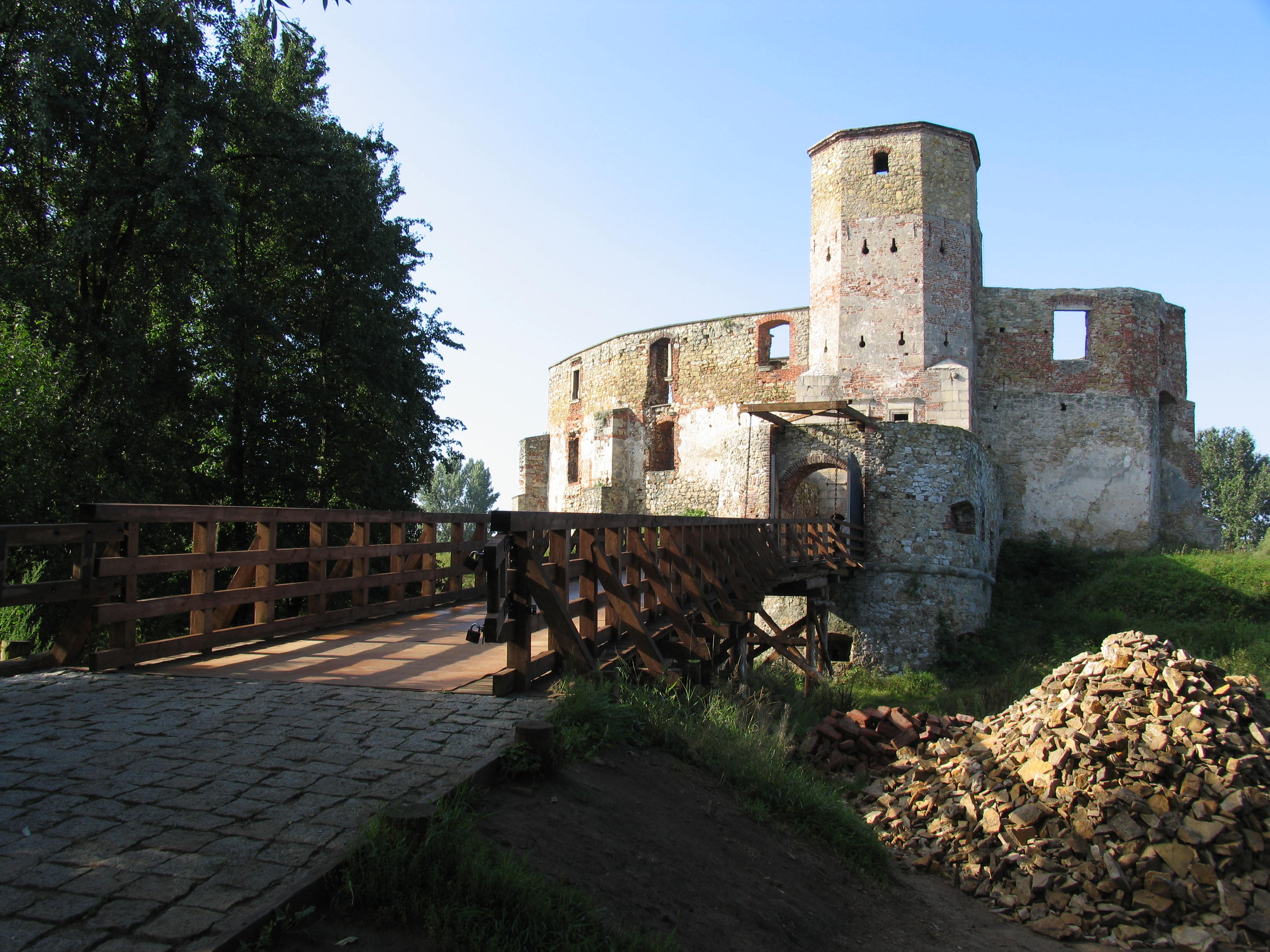
- Castle of Bishops in Siewierz

- Location of the Castle of Bishops in Poland
- 50°28′03″N 19°14′31″E
- Location: Siewierz, Silesian Voivodeship, Poland

History
- Built: 13th century

Site notes
- Architectural style: Gothic

Castle of Bishops in Siewierz - a castle formally housing castellans who raised the castle in the thirteenth century. The stronghold formerly fortified a hamlet in the area, which can be traced back to the origins of the Church of St. John the Baptist; now located close to the National Road No. 78 - for rapid travel to Katowice. The names of the first castellans were Jaks and Wawrzyniec. The castle is located in Siewierz (31 km north-east of Katowice), Silesian Voivodeship in Poland.

== History ==
The Castle in Siewierz was built in the first half of the thirteenth century on a man-made hilltop, where formerly stood a wooden fortress. The oldest of the stronghold's fortifications come from the fifteenth century. In 1443 Duke Wacław I of Cieszyn sold the town and the castle to Kraków's bishop Zbigniew Oleśnicki. The Bishops of Kraków expanded the castle and its fortification walls. The castle began to crumble in the seventeenth century, and Swedish raids quickened its deteriorating. After The Deluge the castle was rebuilt by that didn't stop it from deteriorating and turn into a ruin. The last resident of the castle, Feliks Paweł Turski, left the residence in 1800. The only reason the building did not diminish is due to extensive reconstruction and renovation works in the 1950s, 1970s, and 1990s.

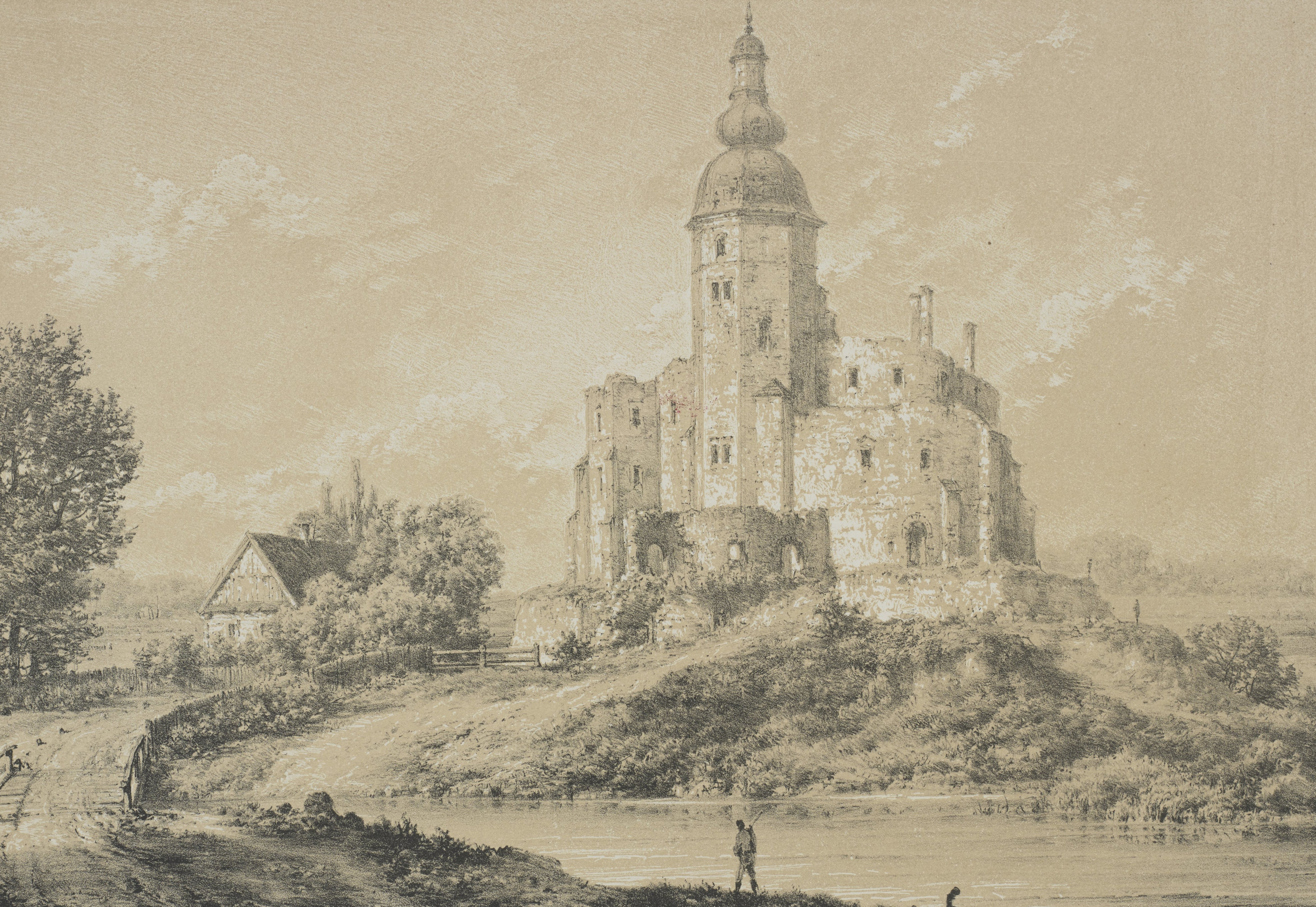
Castle ruins circa 1881–1882

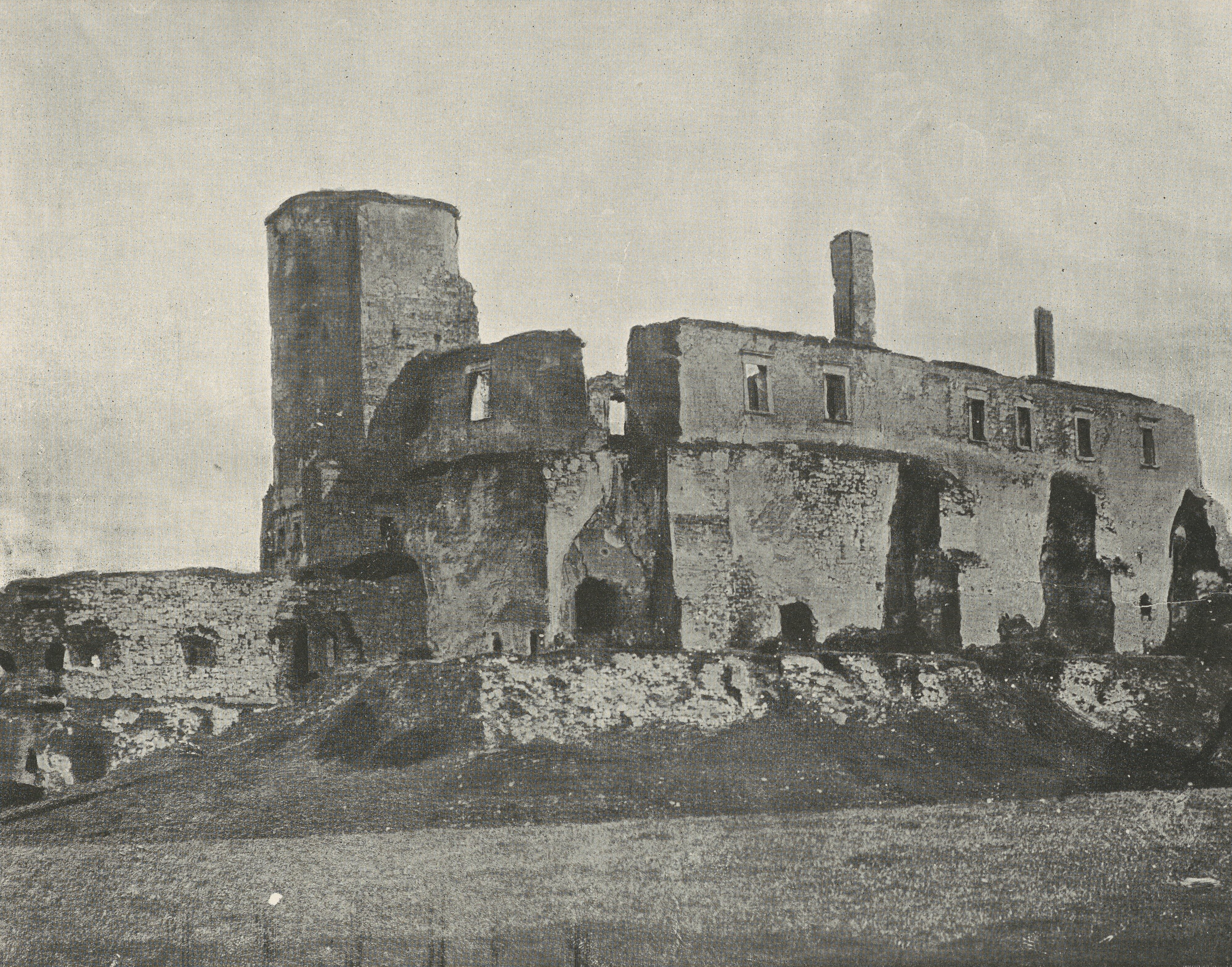
View before 1899
