= Morsko, Silesian Voivodeship =

Morsko
- Village
- Location within Poland
- Coordinates: 50°32′36″N 19°30′15″E
- Country: Poland
- Voivodeship: Silesian
- County: Zawiercie
- Gmina: Włodowice
- Population: 270

Morsko [ˈmɔrskɔ] is a village in the administrative district of Gmina Włodowice, within Zawiercie County, Silesian Voivodeship, in southern Poland.

== See also ==
- Bąkowiec Castle
