= Smoleń, Silesian Voivodeship =

Smoleń
- Village
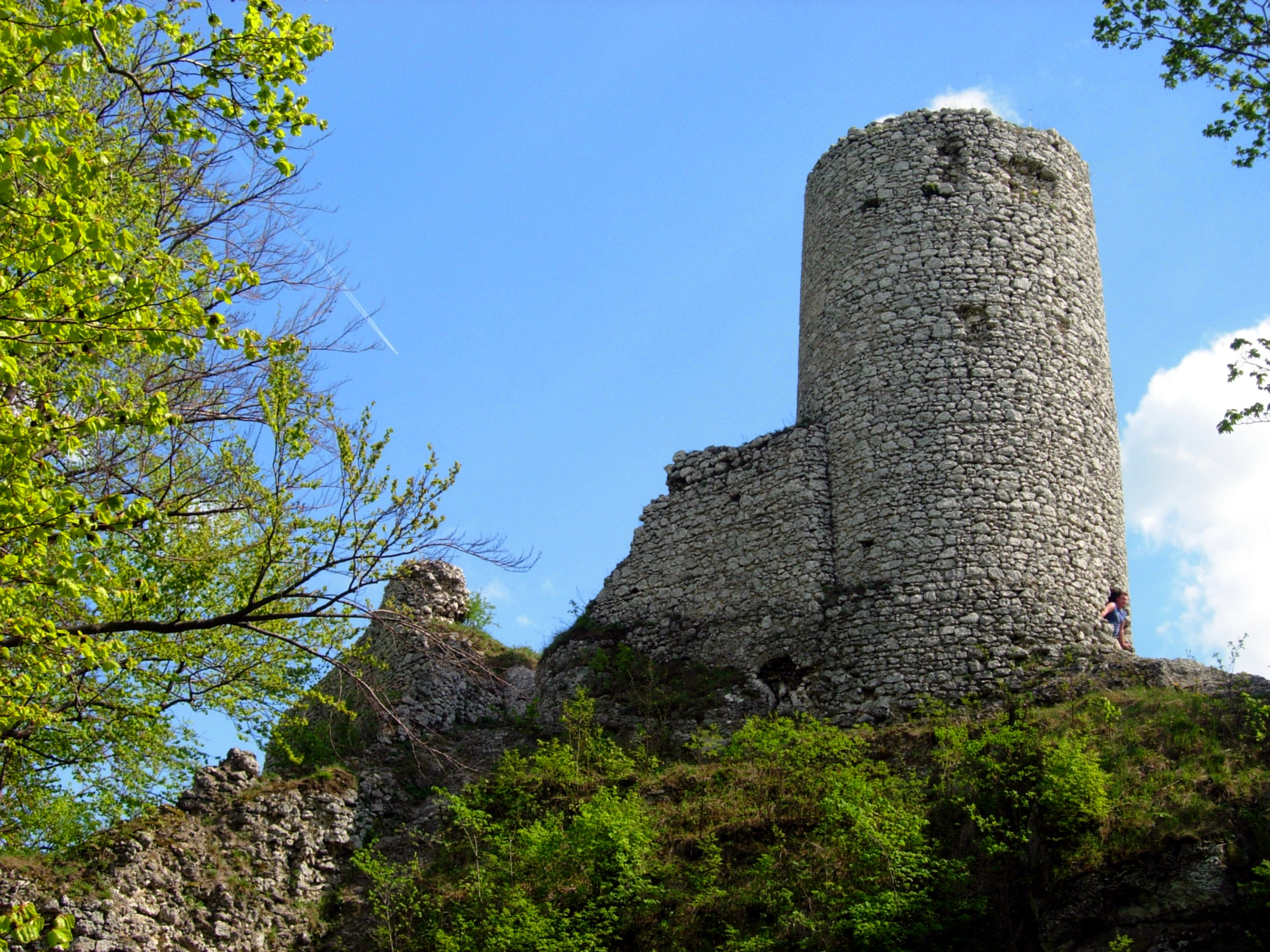
- Castle ruins

- Location within Poland
- Coordinates: 50°26′12″N 19°41′27″E
- Country: Poland
- Voivodeship: Silesian
- County: Zawiercie
- Gmina: Pilica

Smoleń [ˈsmɔlɛɲ] is a village in the administrative district of Gmina Pilica, within Zawiercie County, Silesian Voivodeship, in southern Poland.

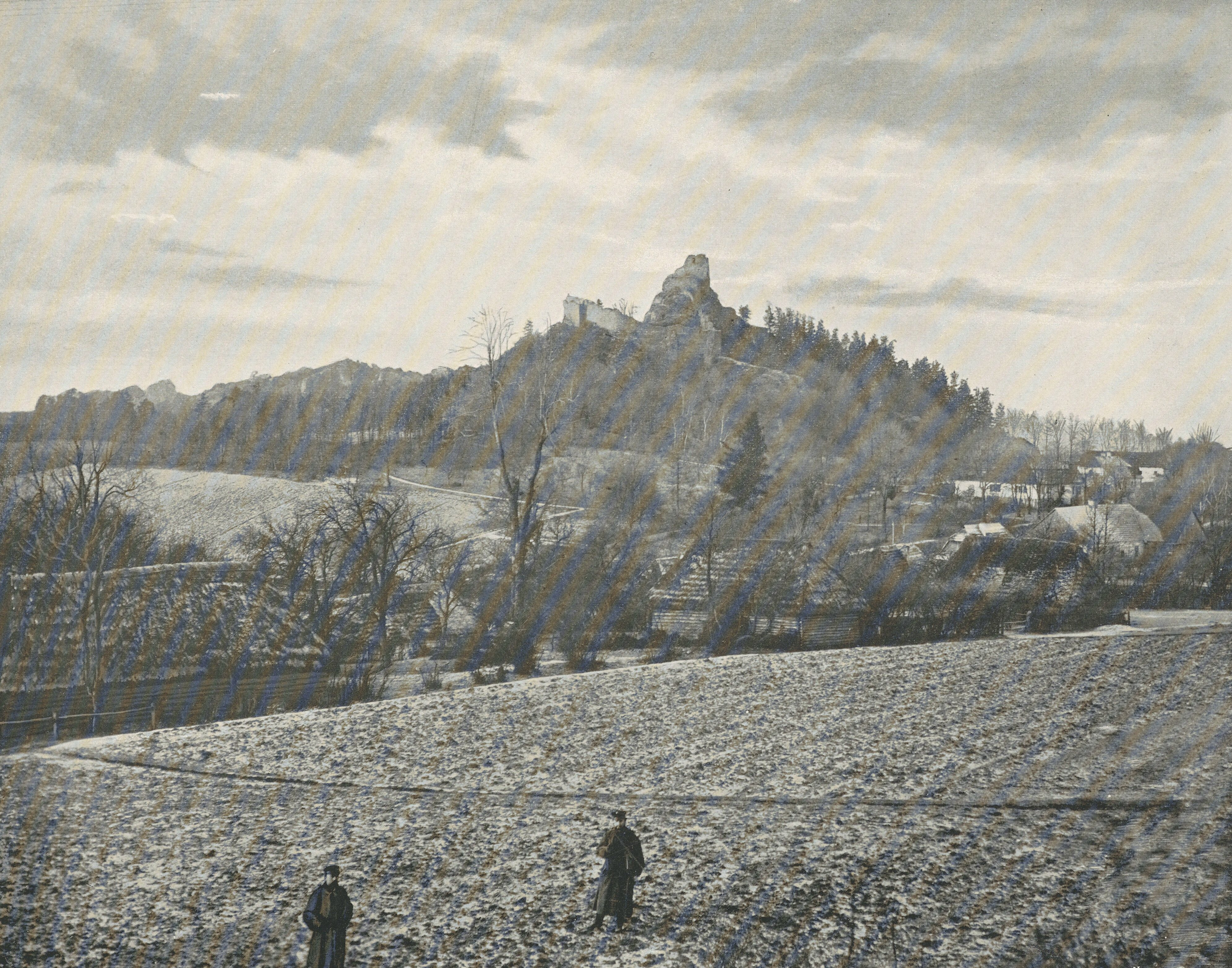
View of the castle before 1899
