= Babice, Chrzanów County =

Babice
- Village
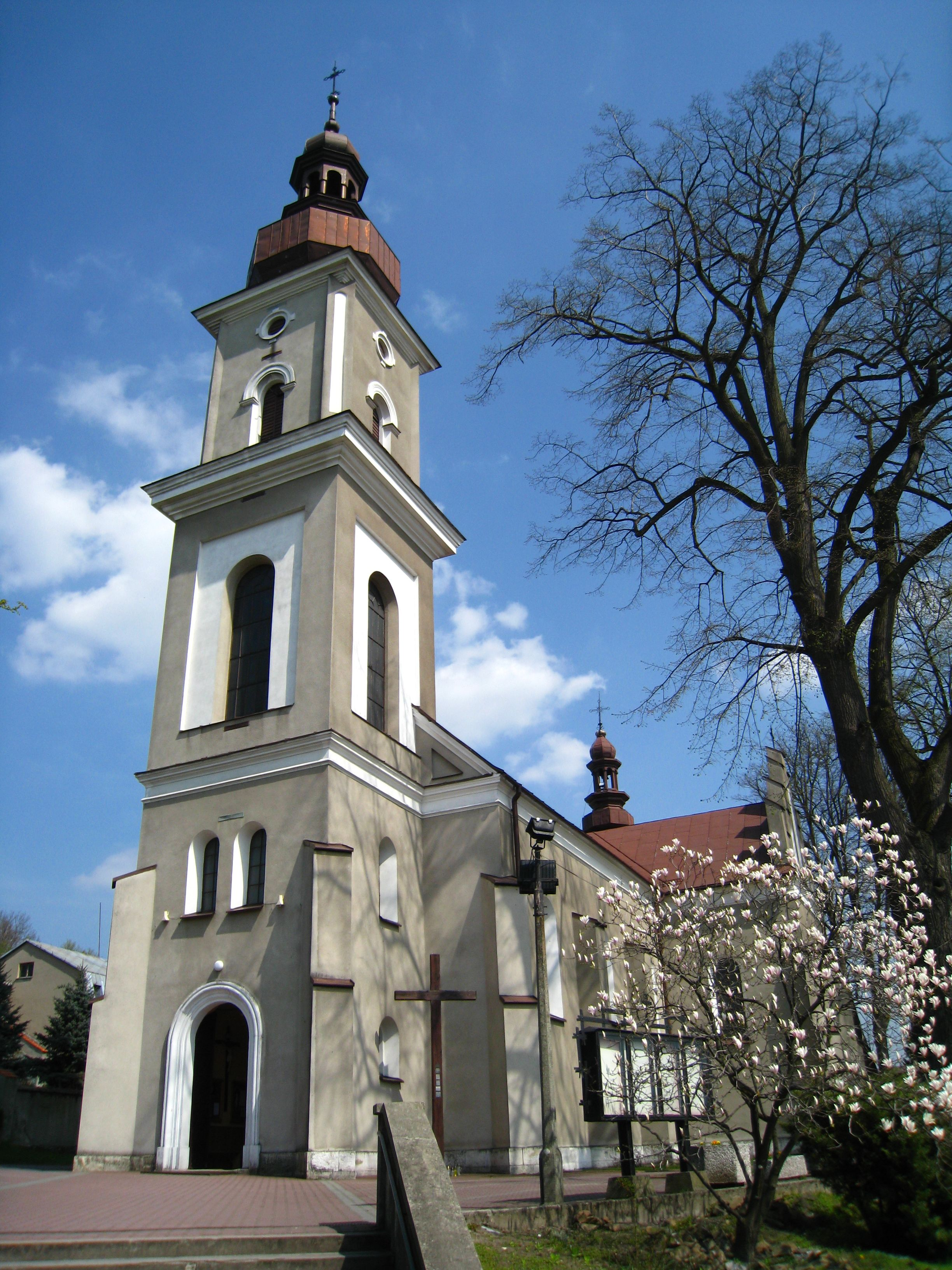
- Church of All Saints

- Location within Poland
- Coordinates: 50°4′12″N 19°26′55″E
- Country: Poland
- Voivodeship: Lesser Poland
- County: Chrzanów
- Gmina: Babice

Population
  - Total: 1,369

Babice (Polish pronunciation: [baˈbit͡sɛ]) is a village in Chrzanów County, Lesser Poland Voivodeship, in southern Poland. It is the seat of the gmina (administrative district) called Gmina Babice.
