= Bobolice Castle =

14th century castle in Bobolice, Poland

Coordinates: 50°36′48″N 19°29′35″E

Bobolice Royal Castle
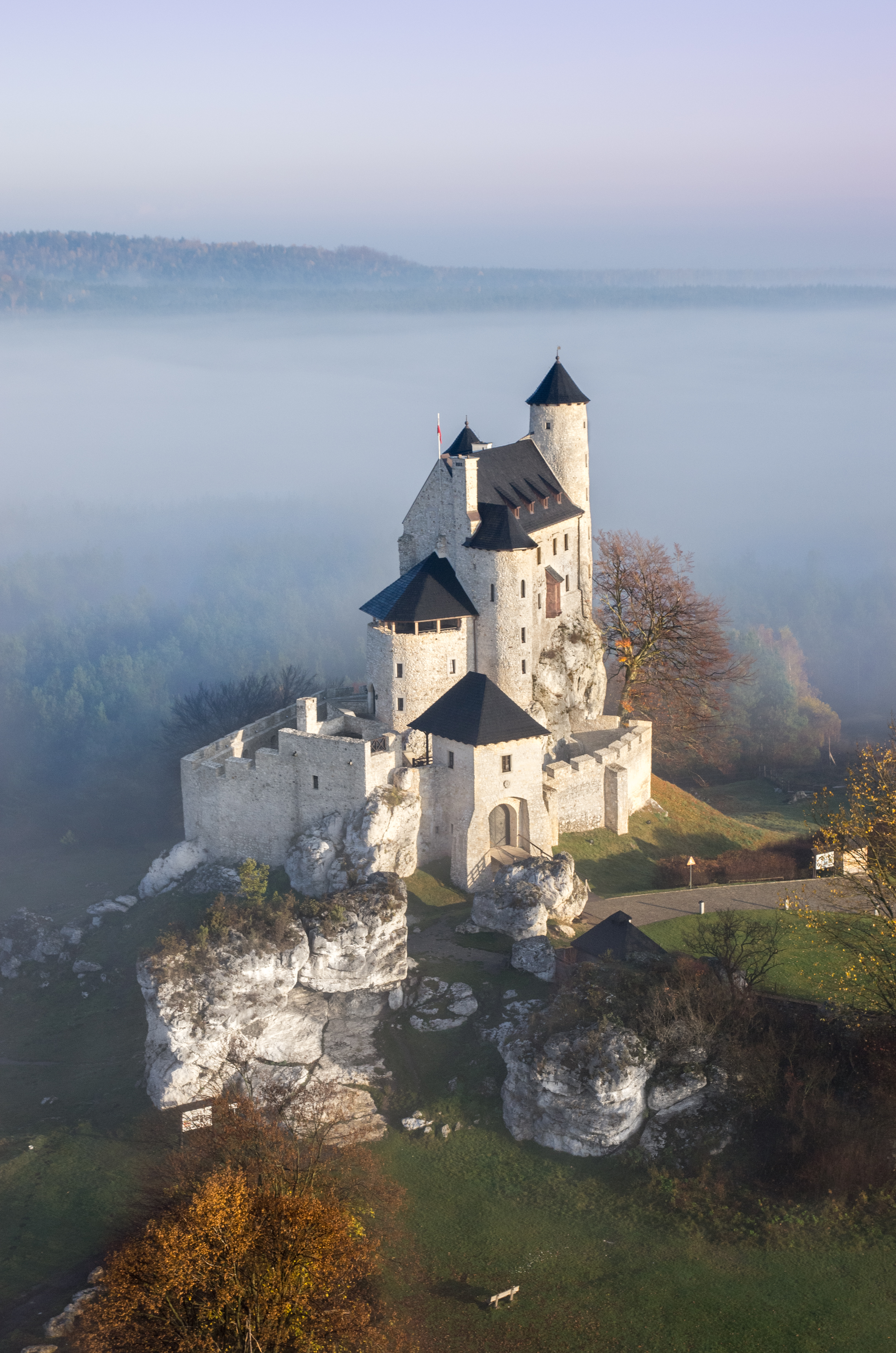
- Interactive map of the Bobolice Royal Castle area

General information
- Architectural style: Polish Gothic
- Location: Bobolice, Poland
- Construction started: 14th century
- Demolished: 1587, 1657
- Client: Casimir III the Great

The Bobolice Castle is a 14th-century royal castle in the village of Bobolice, in the Silesian Voivodeship in southern Poland. The complex is located within a semi-mountainous highland region called the Polish Jura. Having been reduced to a ruin by the end of the 20th century, a reconstruction was started in 2004.

== History ==
The castle in Bobolice was built by King Casimir III the Great in the middle of the 14th century, probably in place of an earlier wooden structure. The castle was a part of the defence system of royal strongholds protecting the western border of Poland on the side of Silesia. In 1370, immediately after becoming King of Poland, Louis I the Great granted the castle to Władysław Opolczyk, Duke of Opole, as a prize for his support of the king’s dynastic plans. Nine years later Opolczyk leased the castle to Andrzej Schoen, a Hungarian from Barbalas; the new owner manned it with Germans and Czechs, who robbed local inhabitants and conspired with the Teutonic Order. Dissatisfied with their behaviour, the Polish king Władysław Jagiełło invaded Bobolice in 1396 and took over the castle with adjacent estates. From that time on, the stronghold was owned by a number of families, including Dołęga (Dołęga coat of arms), Szafrańcowie, Trestkowie, Krezowie (Ostoja coat of arms; owners from 1486) and later Chodakowscy, Męcińscy and Myszkowscy (Jastrzębiec coat of arms; owners of the neighbouring Mirów Castle). At Bobolice castle, the gentle crest Dołęga (Dołęga coat of arms), is placed above the gate stronghold.

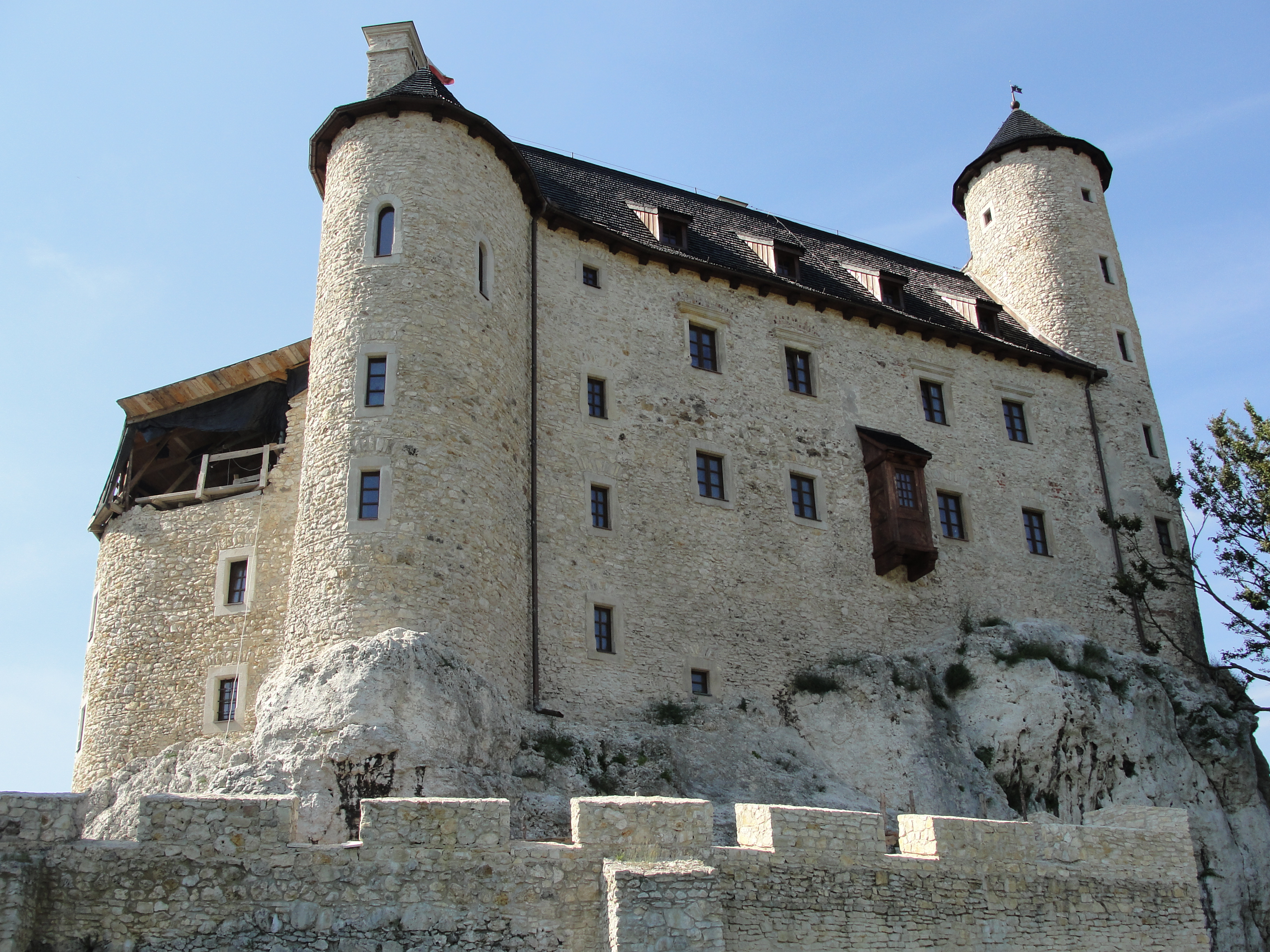
Residential building of the castle

According to 15th century chronicles, a representative of the Krezowie family captured and imprisoned his niece in the Bobolice Castle. She is still said to haunt the stronghold as a lady in white. There is also a local legend about two twin brothers, owners of castles in Mirów and Bobolice. The legend tells of a treasure hidden in a tunnel between their strongholds, with a witch on guard to deter any potential thieves. One brother brought a beautiful girl home from his war expedition. Suspecting that his twin brother may have fallen in love with the girl, he locked her in the cellar near the treasure. One day, during the absence of the witch, who was attending a witches’ sabbath at the Bald Mount, he caught the pair of lovers in the vault. Enraged, he killed his brother and entombed the girl in the castle dungeons.

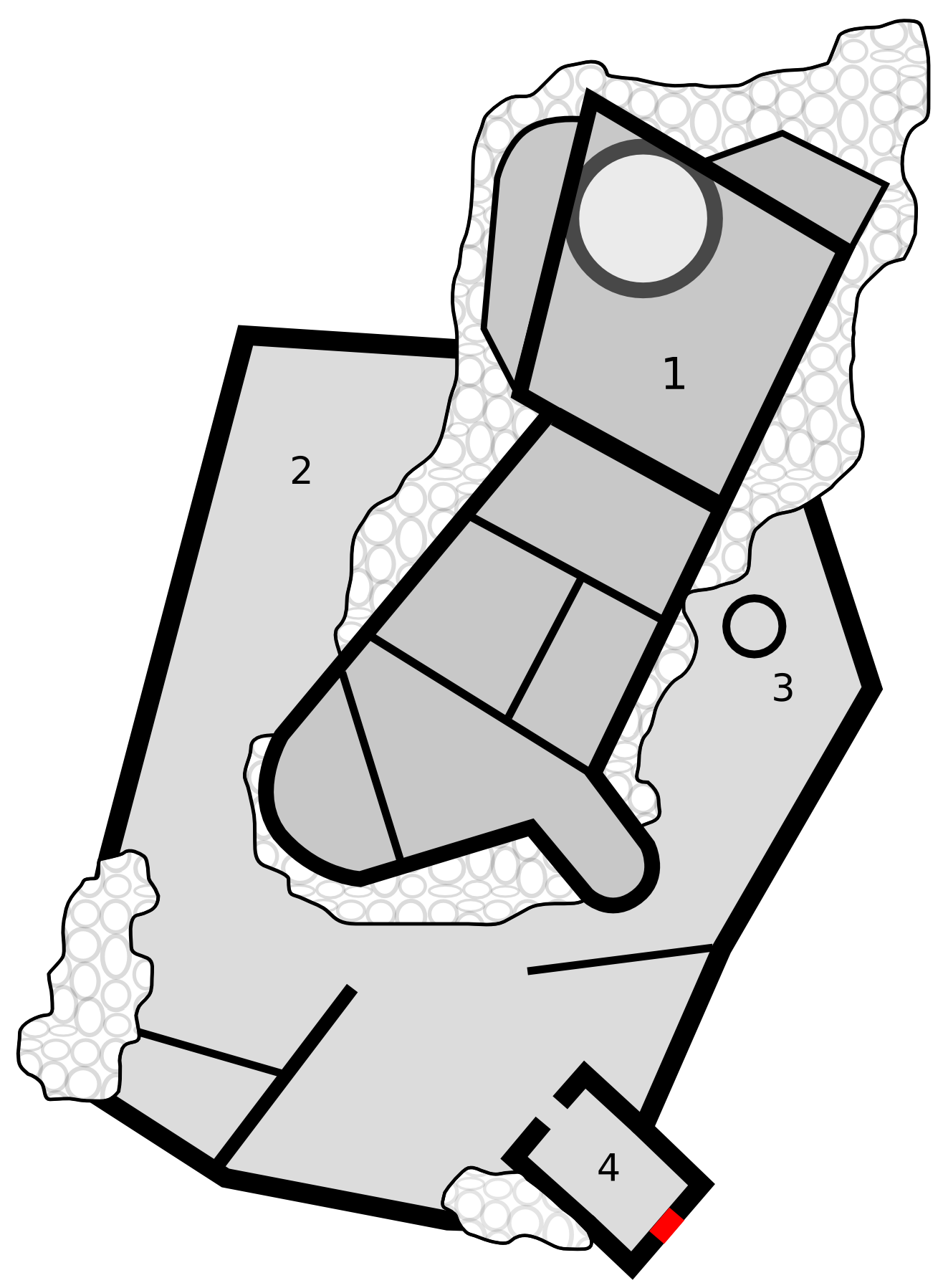
Plan of the castle

The beginning of the decline of the castle dates back to 1587, when it was heavily devastated during the invasion of Maximilian III, Archduke of Austria, a rival of Sigismund III Vasa to the Polish throne. The castle was reconstructed by the then owners, the Krezowie family, but in 1657, during the Deluge, it was plundered and totally ruined by Swedish troops. The condition of the stronghold was so bad that when King John III Sobieski arrived here in 1683, he had to spend the night in a tent.

In the 19th century a huge treasure was found in stronghold cellars. In 1882, after parcelling out the land, the already deserted walls were acquired by the peasant family of Baryłów. The castle now belongs to the Lasecki family, who decided to rebuild it in 1999. The rebuilding was criticised by art historians and conservators.

== Architecture ==
The castle is situated on a steep rocky hill (360 m above sea level). Until recently, only the upper part of the stronghold (the residential building with at least two storeys and remnants of the cylindrical wall tower) has survived. The castle was accessible through a drawbridge over the dry moat, and the entire construction was surrounded by walls with battlements, made of local white limestone. Reconstruction works are under way in order to restore the entrance gate and the circumferential wall around the castle grounds.

== Gallery ==
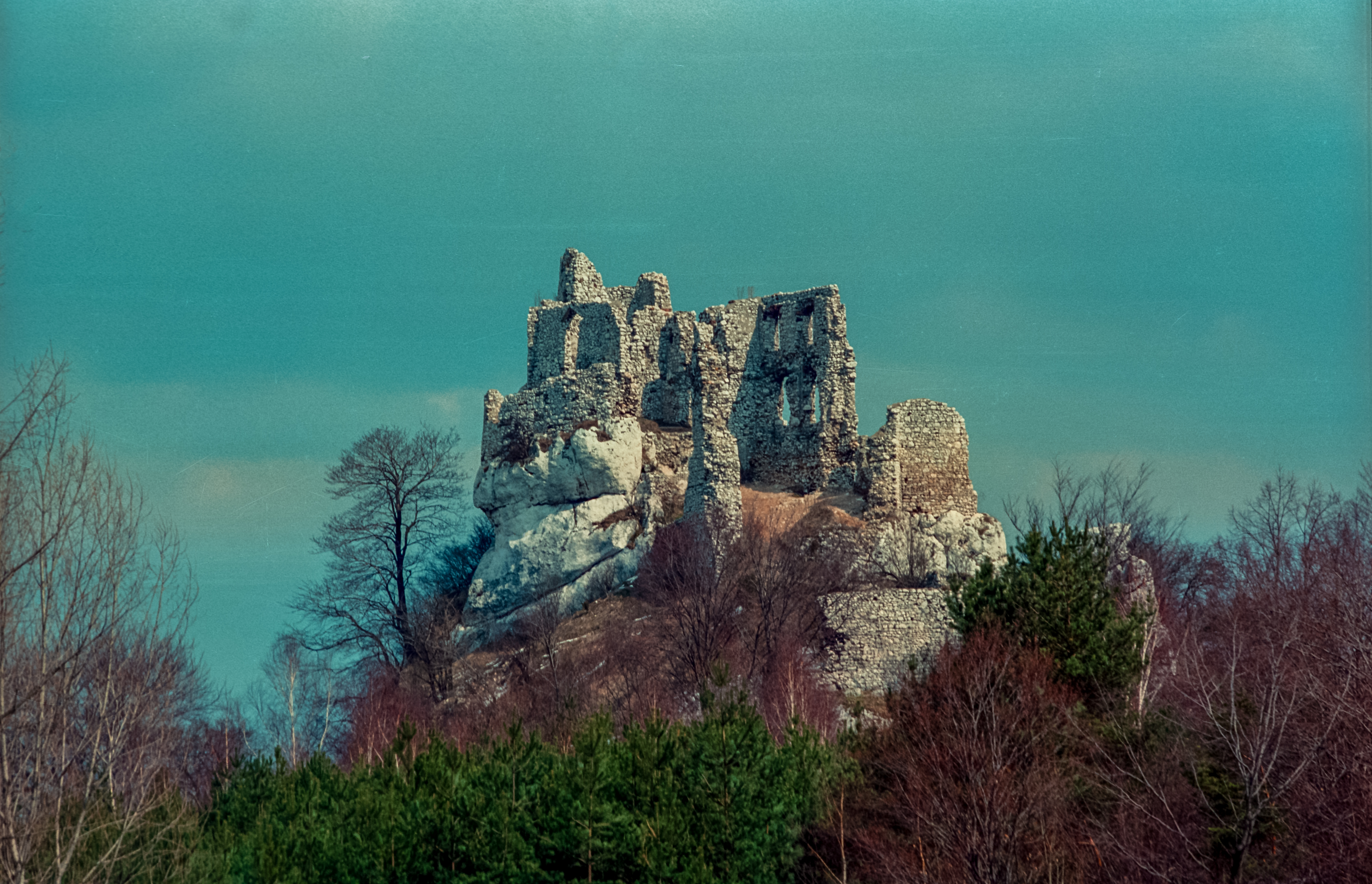
Ruined castle before restoration

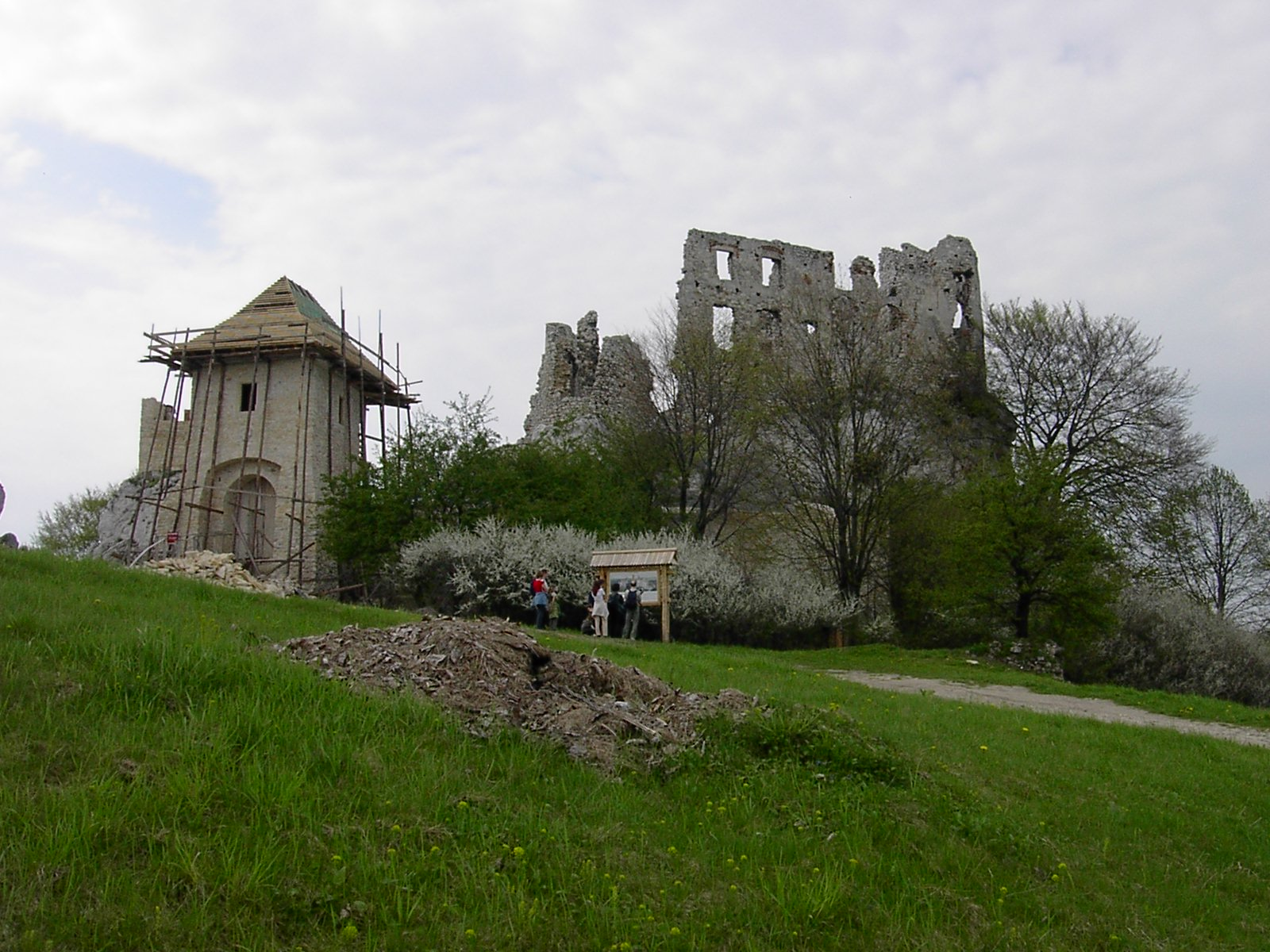
Beginning of the castle restoration in 2004

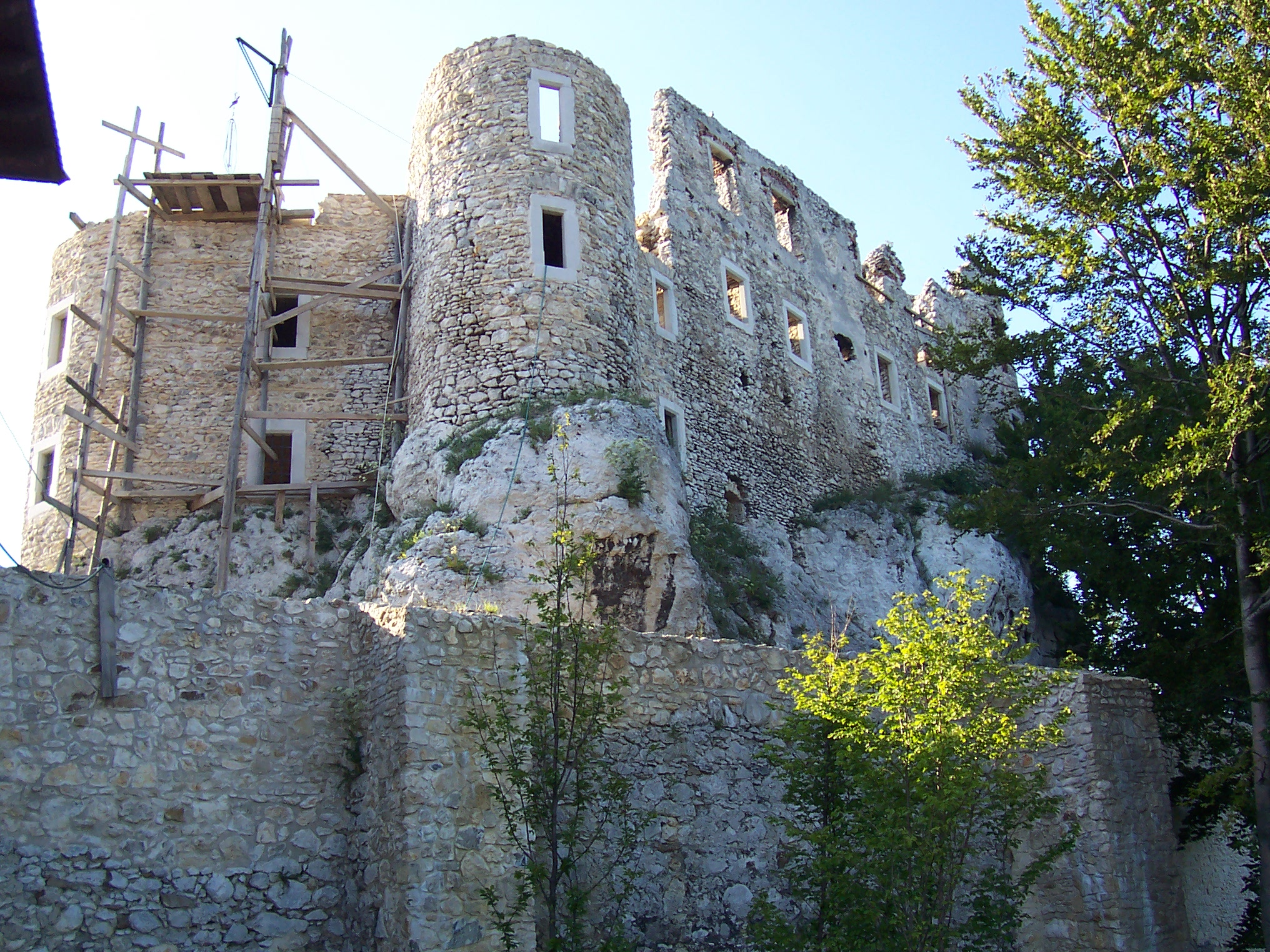
Castle in July 2007

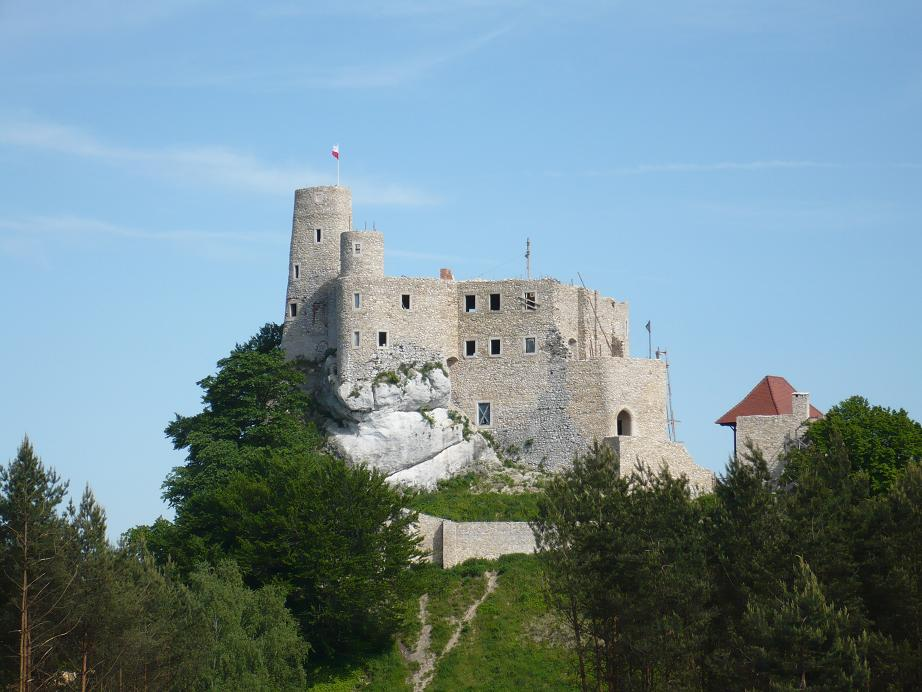
Bobolice Castle 2008

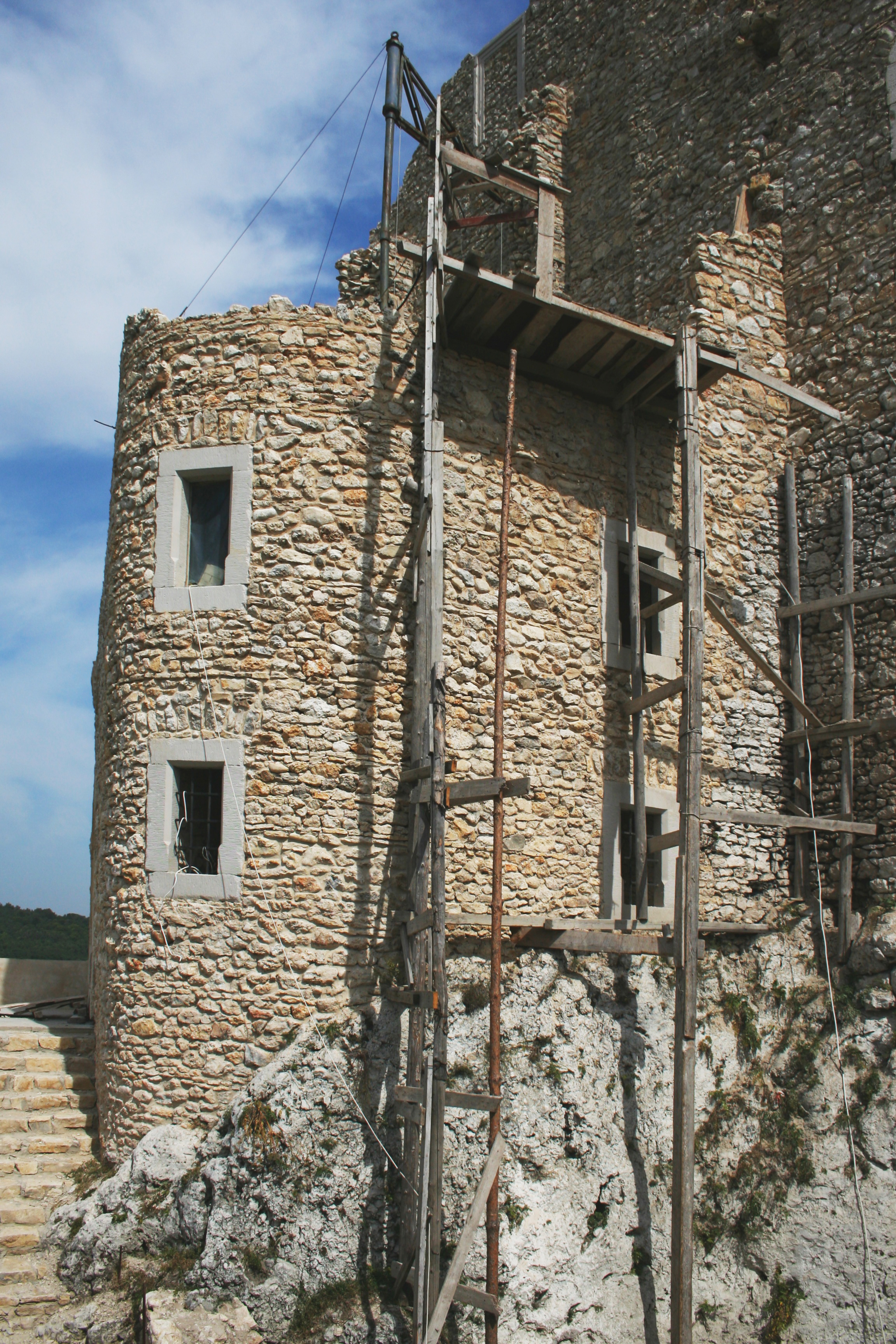
The reconstruction of one of the towers of the castle (August 2008)

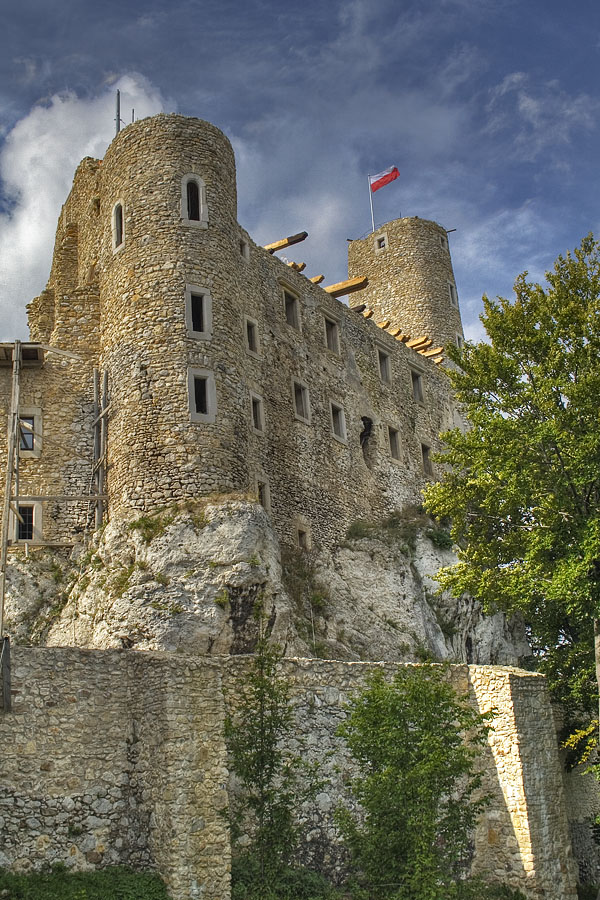
Bobolice Castle in September 2008

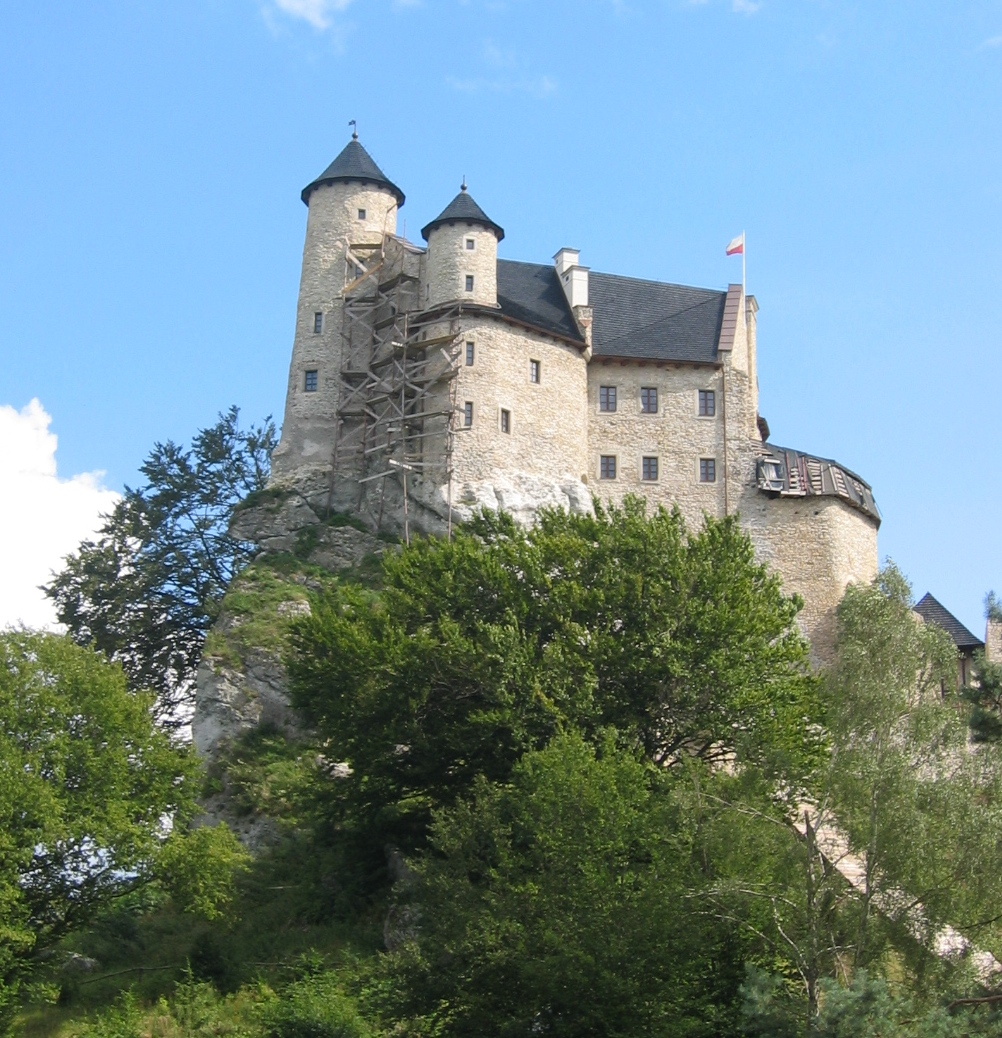
Bobolice Castle in August 2010

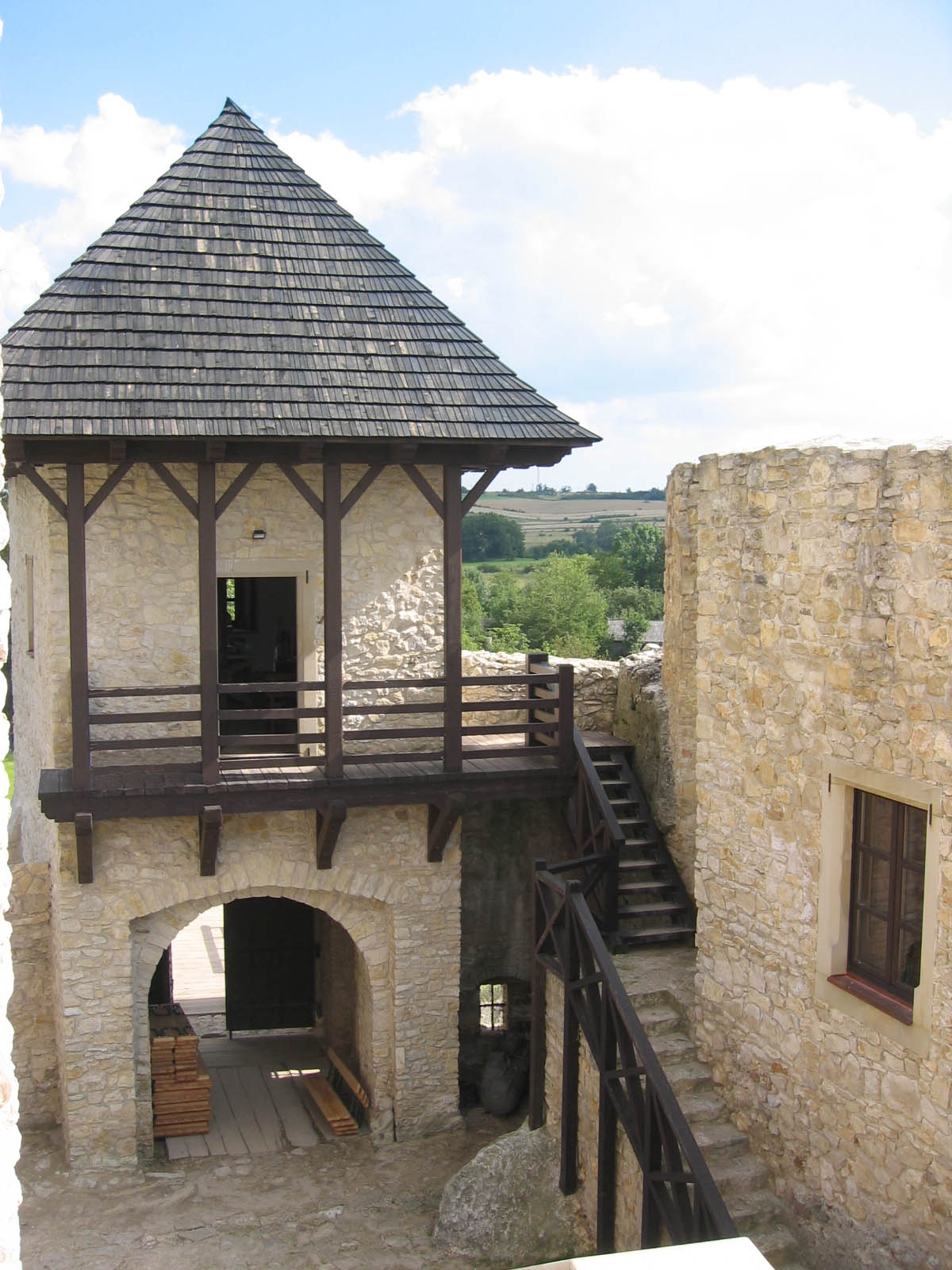
Bobolice Castle gate tower, August 2010

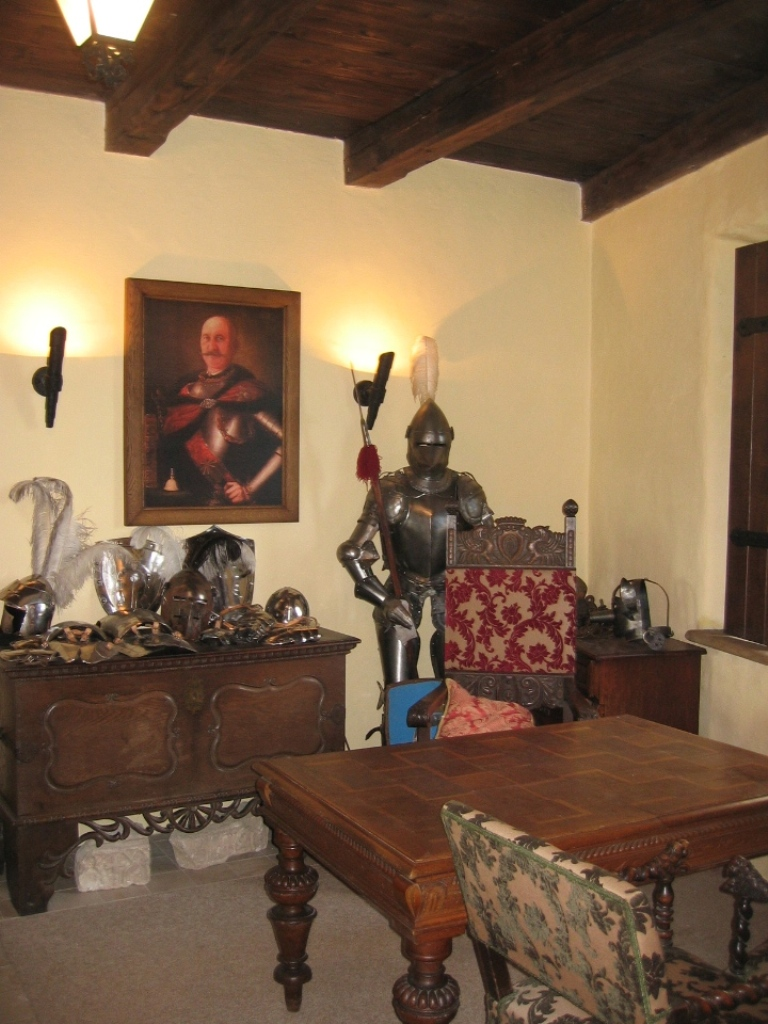
Bobolice Castle - interior of reconstructed guardhouse, August 2010

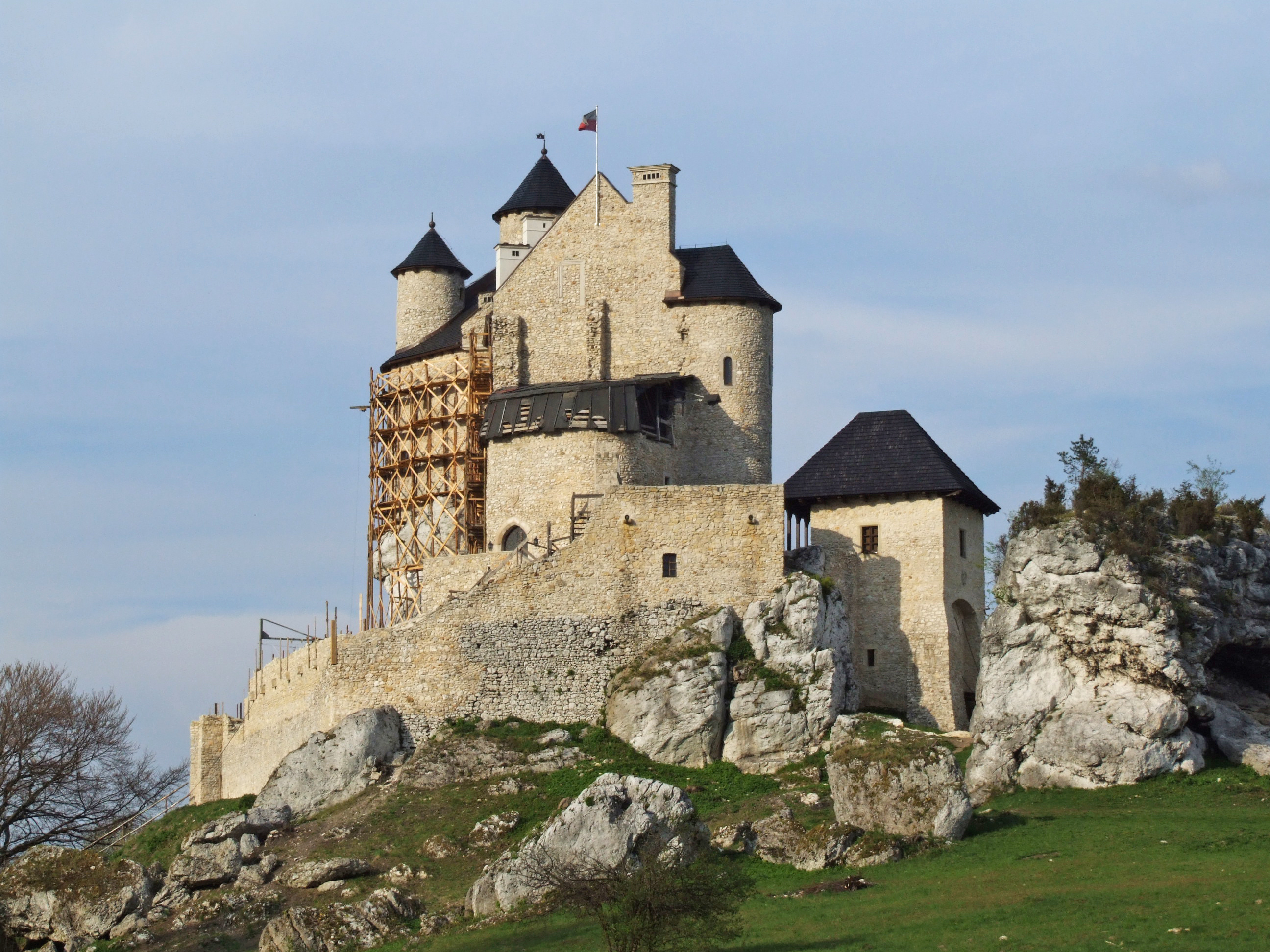
Castle Bobolice during reconstruction in April 2011

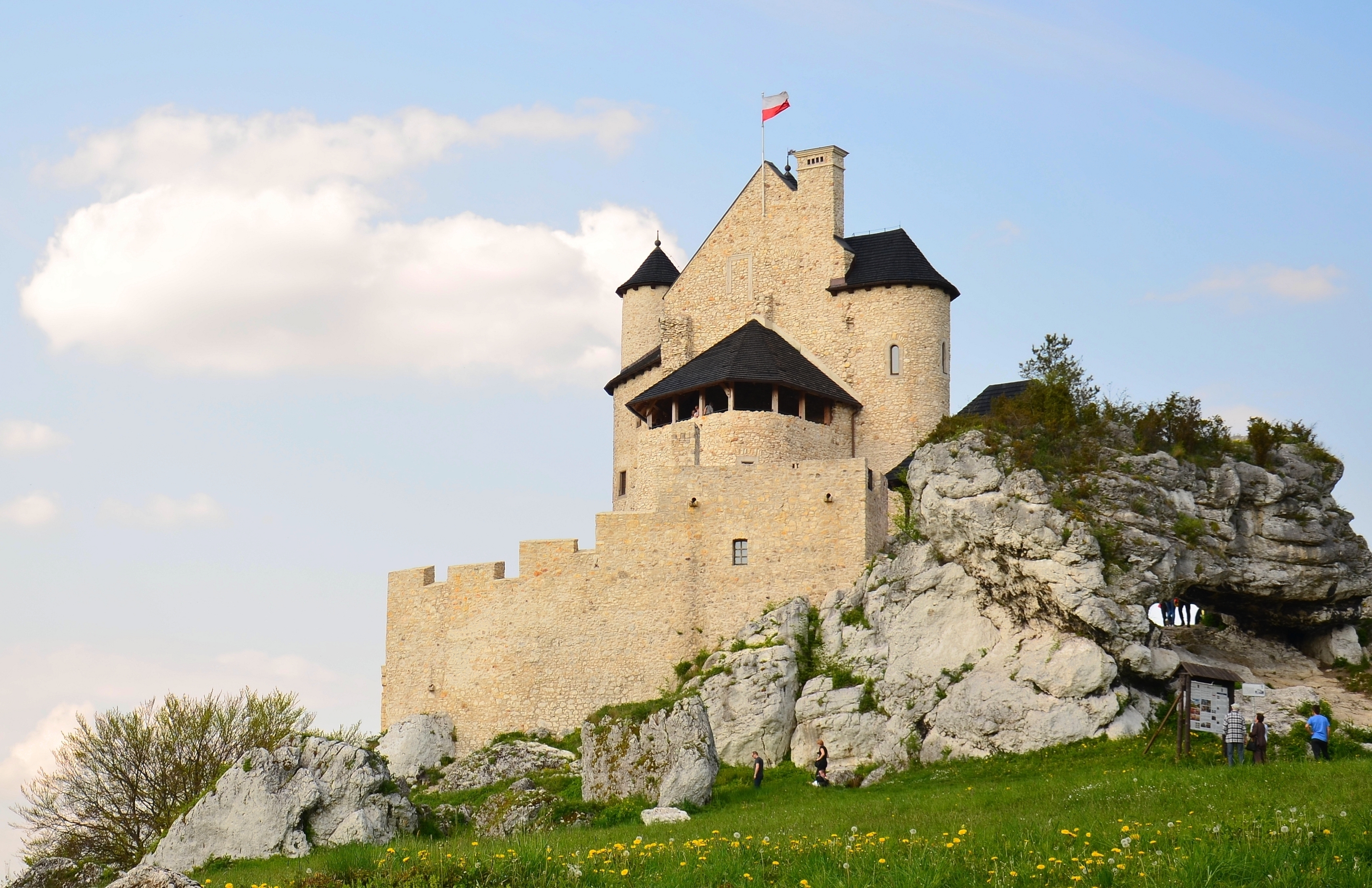
Castle 2014

== See also ==
- Castles in Poland
- Trail of the Eagle's Nests

== Bibliography ==
- Leszek Marzec, Kazimierz Mazurek, Tomasz Suchecki, Wyżyna Krakowsko-Częstochowska, Warszawa 1986, ISBN 83-7005-057-3.
