= Mirów, Silesian Voivodeship =

Mirów
- Village
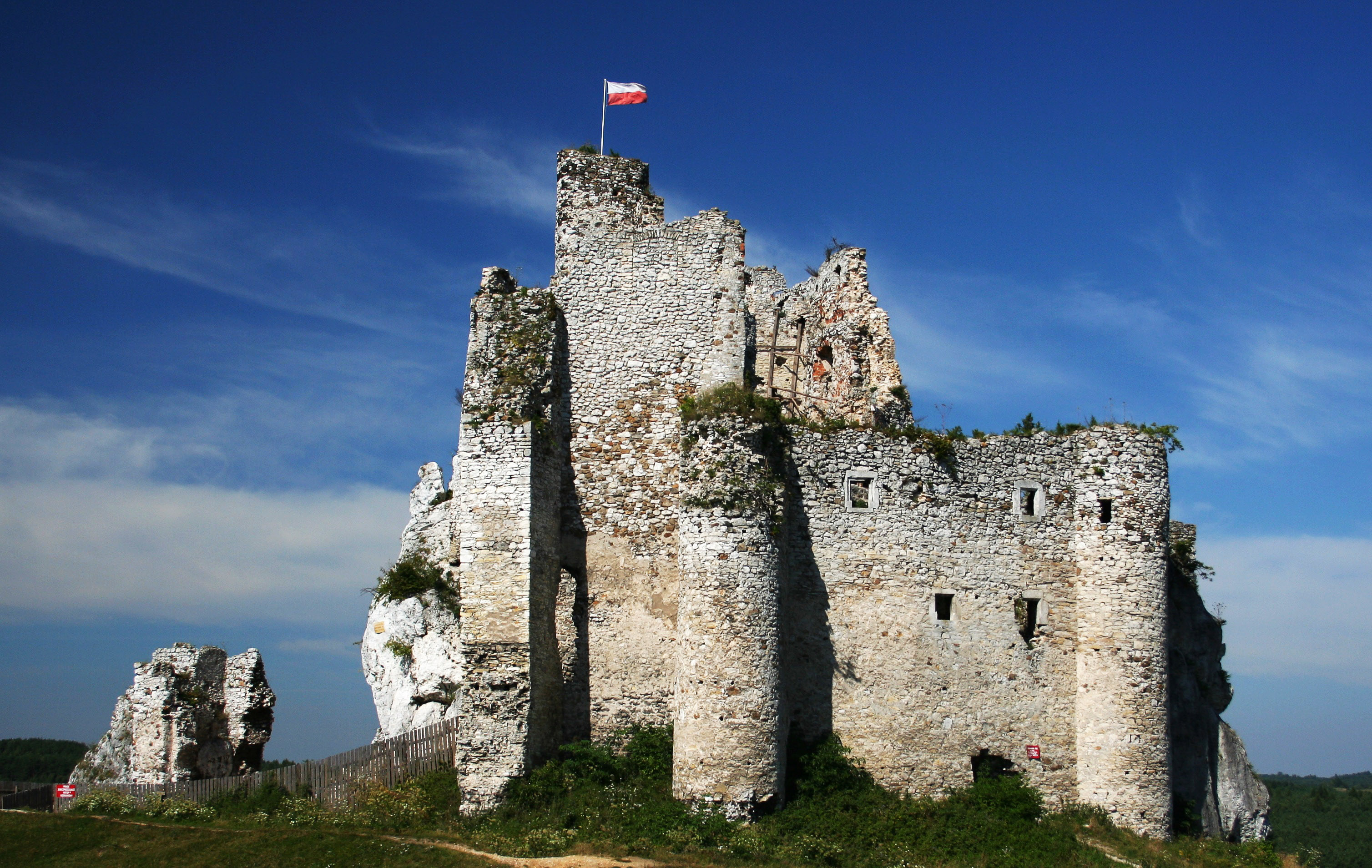
- Ruins of Mirów Castle

- Location within Poland
- Coordinates: 50°36′51″N 19°28′5″E
- Country: Poland
- Voivodeship: Silesian
- County: Myszków
- Gmina: Niegowa

Mirów [ˈmiruf] is a village in the administrative district of Gmina Niegowa, within Myszków County, Silesian Voivodeship, in southern Poland.

It is best known for the ruins of the 14th-century Mirów Castle, part of a defensive chain of medieval castles built along Polish Jura (Jura Krakowsko-Częstochowska). To the south of Mirów, there are Beskidy Mountains, including Silesian and Żywiec Beskids.
