= Bobolice, Silesian Voivodeship =

Bobolice
- Village
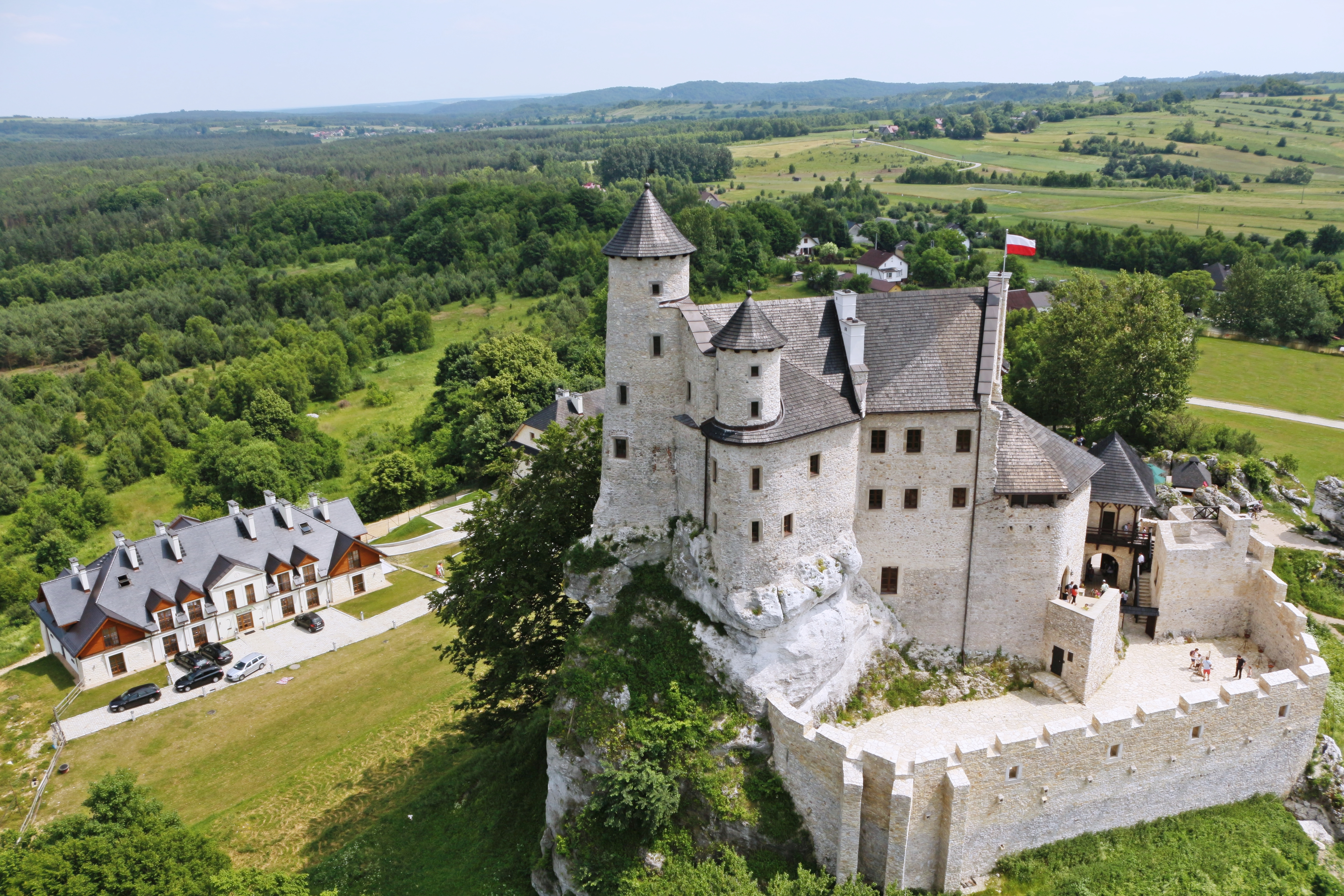
- Bobolice Castle

- Location within Poland
- Coordinates: 50°36′38″N 19°29′33″E
- Country: Poland
- Voivodeship: Silesian
- County: Myszków
- Gmina: Niegowa
- Website: http://www.zamekbobolice.pl

Bobolice [bɔbɔˈlit͡sɛ] is a village in the administrative district of Gmina Niegowa, within Myszków County, Silesian Voivodeship, in southern Poland.

Bobolice Castle is located in the village.
