= Mirów Castle =

14th-century castle in Poland

Coordinates: 50°36′53″N 19°28′30″E

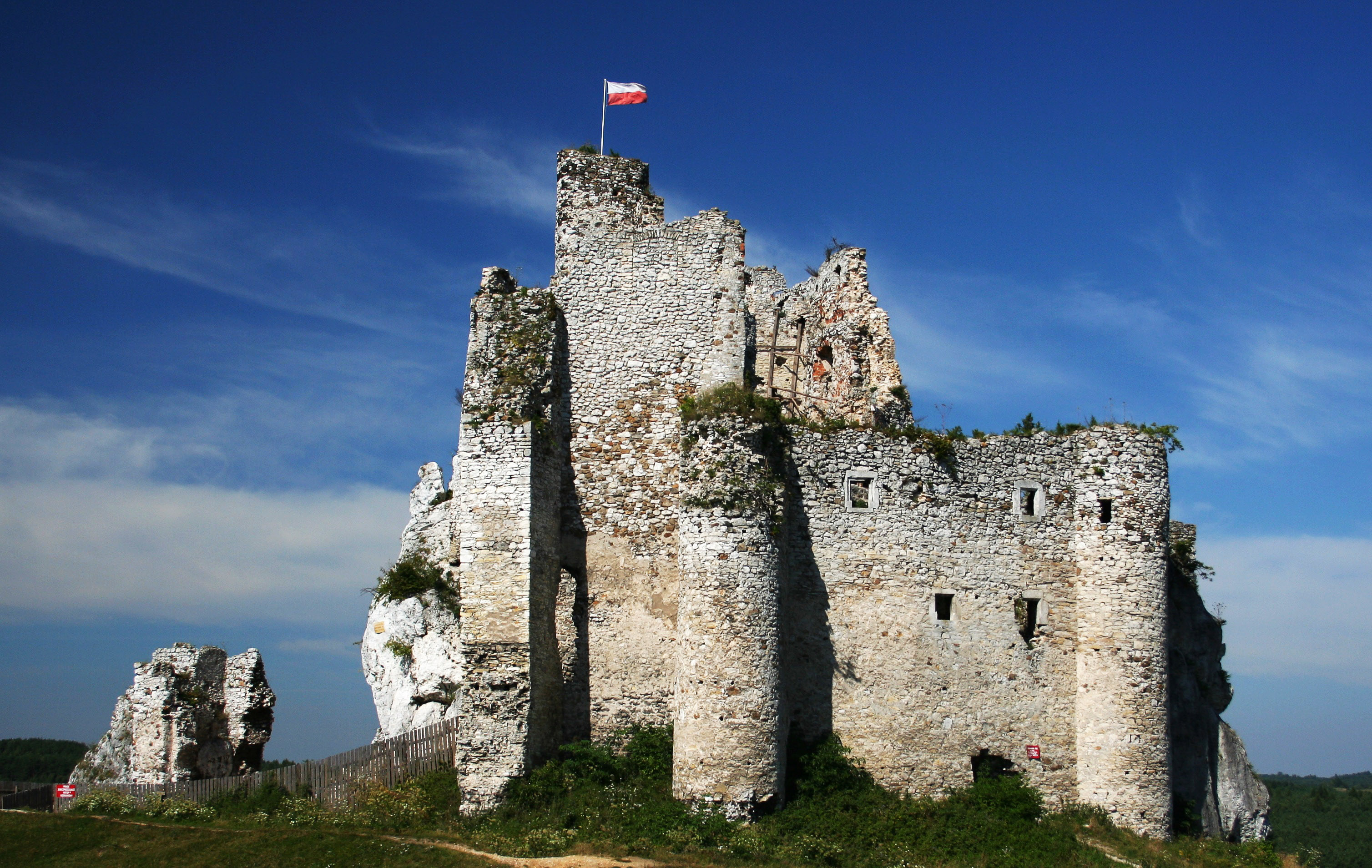
- Interactive map of the Mirów Castle area

General information
- Architectural style: Polish Gothic
- Location: Mirów, Poland
- Construction started: 14th century
- Demolished: 1657

Mirów Castle (Polish: Zamek w Mirowie) is a 14th-century castle, now ruined, located in the Mirów village, Silesian Voivodeship, Poland. It changed owners multiple times, and was finally abandoned in 1787.

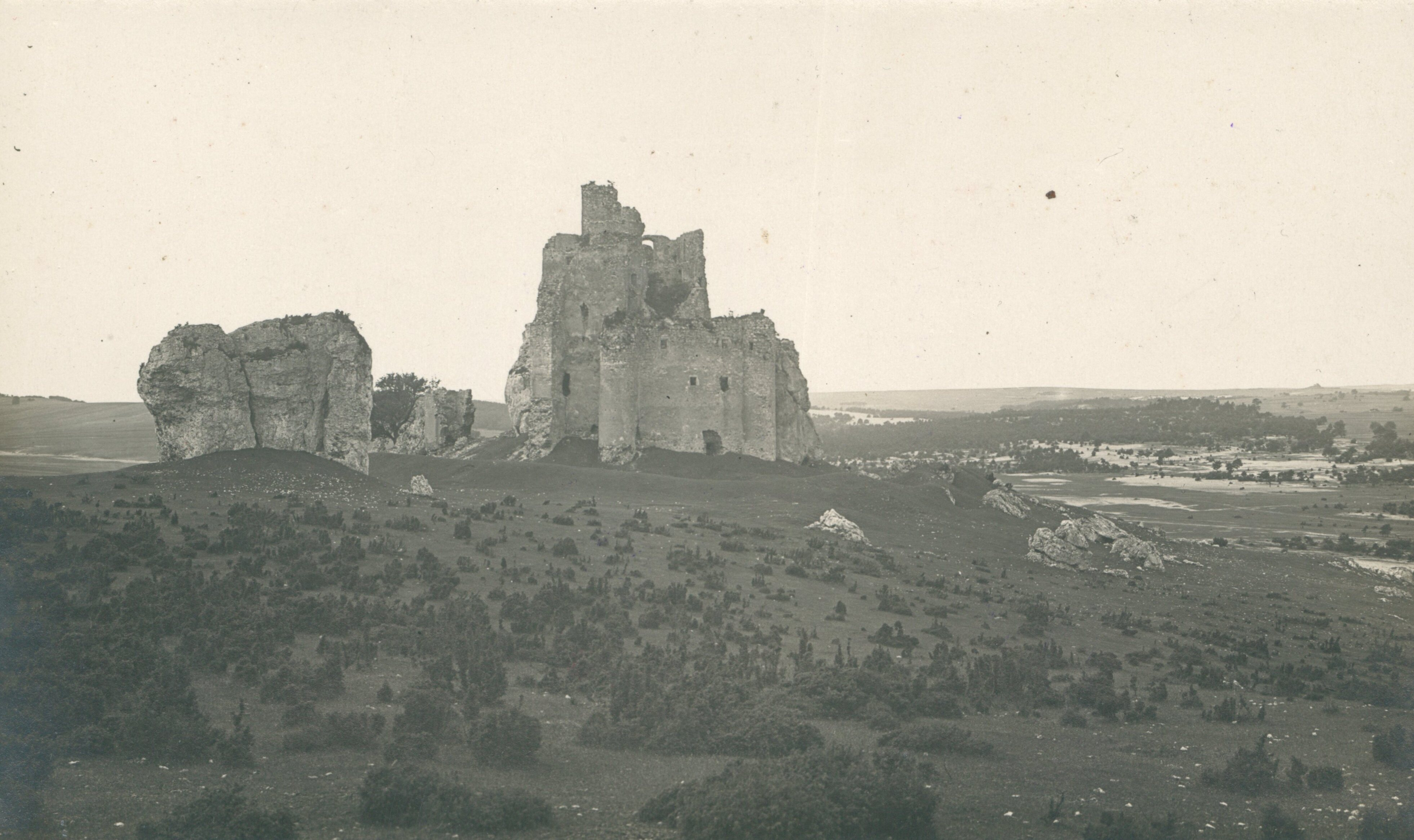
Castle ruins, before 1932

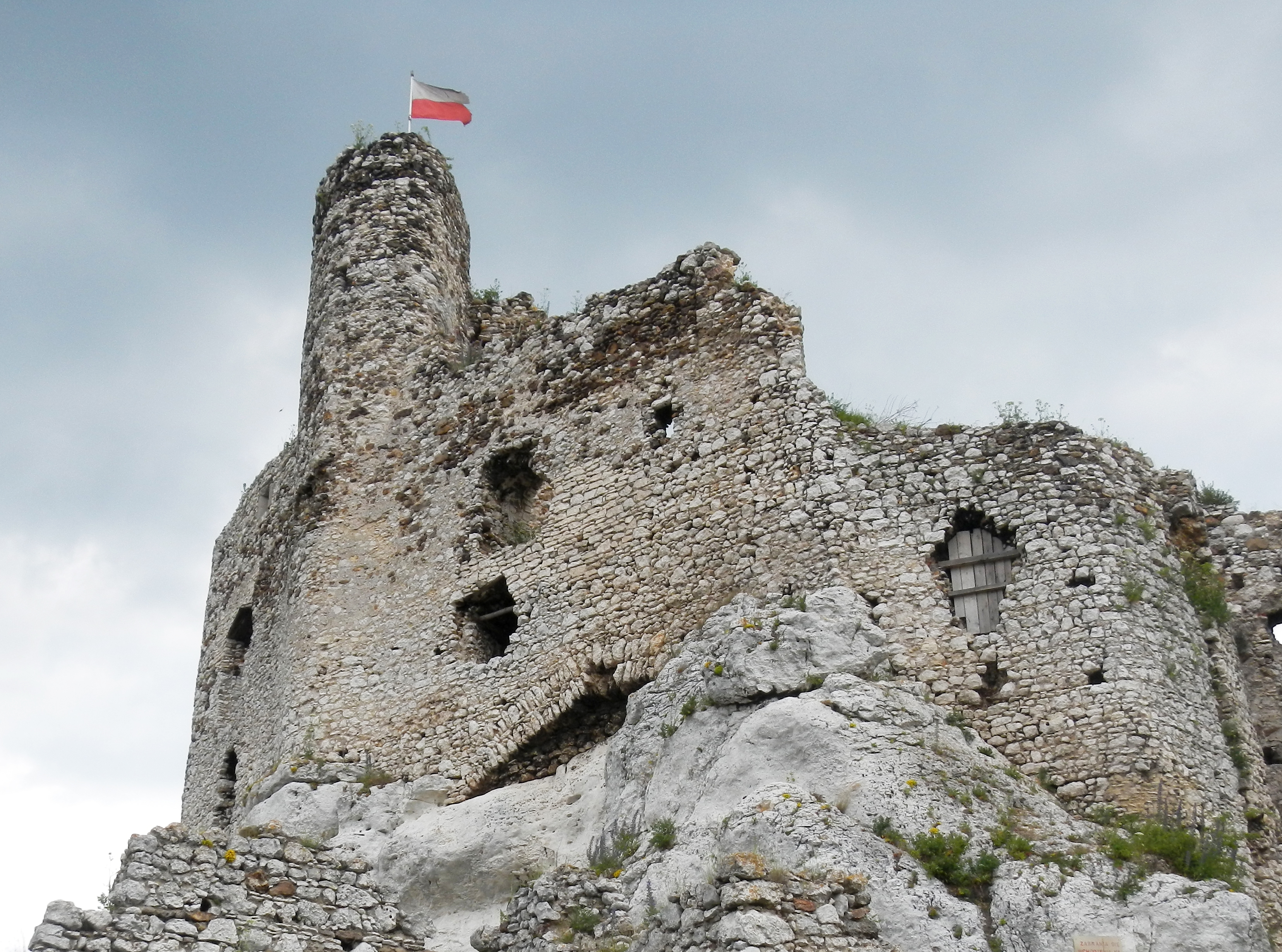
Mirów Castle, Poland.

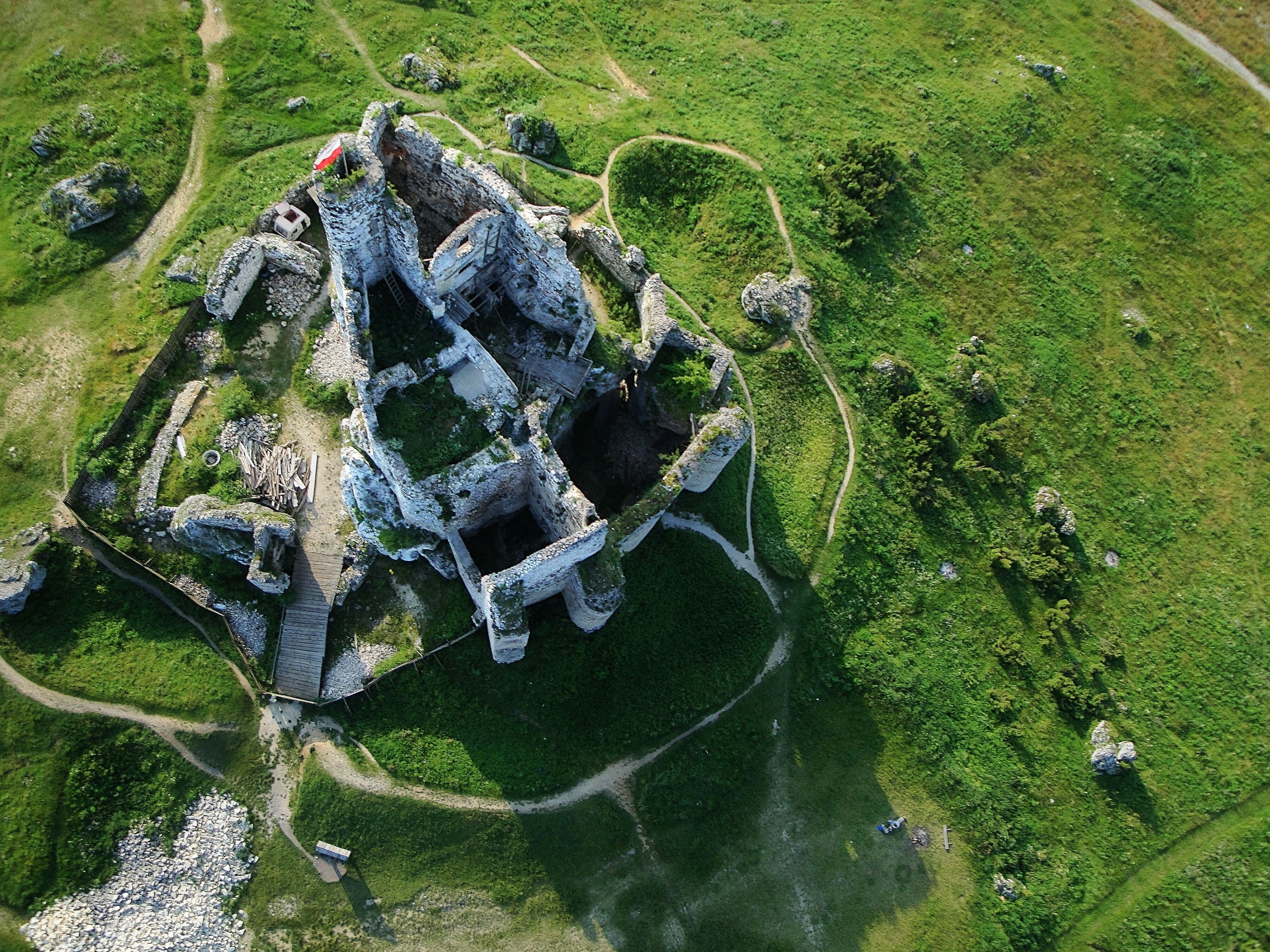
Remains for the air

== See also ==
- Castles in Poland
