= Klaus Naumann (historian) =

German historian and author (born 1949)

- Born: 1949 (age 76–77); Bremen, Germany
- Occupations: Historian, author, editor

Academic work
- Era: 20th century
- Institutions: Hamburg Institute for Social Research
- Main interests: Modern European history, military history, historiography

Klaus Naumann (born 1949) is a German historian and author who specialises in modern European history. His research and writings have focused on contemporary interpretations of the legacy of World War II and on cultural history. Naumann authored several books on these topics, published both in German and in English.

== Education and career ==
Naumann studied history and political science at the University of Marburg where he received his PhD in 1982. From 1981 to 1992 he was editor of the Journal of German and International Politics (Blätter für deutsche und internationale Politik); since 1992 he was the co-editor of this magazine. From 1992 to 2017, Hartmann was a historian at the Hamburg Institute for Social Research.

== Research focus ==
Naumann's research focuses on modern European history, including on the post-war period in West Germany. He researched the formation of the Bundeswehr in his work Generale in der Demokratie. Generationsgeschichtliche Studien zur Bundeswehrelite ("Generals in Democracy"), which included biographical sketches of key figures in the West German armed forces, such as General Anton Detlev von Plato.

Together with Hannes Heer, also of Hamburg Institute for Social Research, Naumann edited the collection of essays published in English by Berghahn Books as War of Extermination: The German Military in World War II. The last chapter of the volume, contributed by Naumann, focused on the myth of the clean Wehrmacht and its impact on the German collective memory of the war.

Naumann's 1998 book, Der Krieg als Text: Das Jahr 1945 im kulturellen Gedächtnis der Presse ("The war as Text: Year 1945 in Cultural Memory") focused on the commemoration of World War II in modern-day, unified Germany. The book explored various commemorations of the 50th anniversary of the end of the war, with a focus on print media. According to a review in German Politics and Society, Naumann finds that dated interpretations still remained, such as "'defenses of the 'honour' of the 'clean' Wehrmacht, lack of empathy for 'other' victims, as well as the persistence of an undifferentiated and mythical collective self." The review finds that "although the self-centered memory of [German] victimization and suffering continued, this interpretation was much more complicated, ambivalent, and ambiguous than ever before".

== Select works ==
=== In English ===
- Shifting Memories: The Nazi Past in the New Germany, University of Michigan Press, Ann Arbor, 2000
- Hannes Heer; Klaus Naumann, eds. (2004). War of Extermination: The German Military In World War II. Berghahn Books. ISBN 1-57181-232-6.

=== In German ===
- Ökonomische Gesellschaftsformation und historische Formationsanalyse, 1983, ISBN 3-7609-5146-5, (zugl. Diss. Univ. Marburg 1982)
- Der Krieg als Text. Das Jahr 1945 im kulturellen Gedächtnis der Presse, Hamburger Edition, Hamburg 1998 ISBN 3-930908-41-7
- Generale in der Demokratie. Generationsgeschichtliche Studien zur Bundeswehrelite, Hamburger Edition, Hamburg 2007, ISBN 978-3-936096-76-7
- Einsatz ohne Ziel? Die Politikbedürftigkeit des Militärischen, Hamburger Edition, Hamburg 2008, ISBN 978-3-936096-98-9
- Der blinde Spiegel. Deutschland im afghanischen Transformationskrieg, 2013, ISBN 978-3-86854-264-6
