= Hitler's Generals on Trial =

2010 book by Valerie Hébert

Hitler's Generals on Trial: The Last War Crimes Tribunal at Nuremberg
- First edition cover
- Author: Valerie Geneviève Hébert
- Language: English
- Genre: History; Historiography
- Publisher: University Press of Kansas
- Publication date: 2010
- Publication place: United States
- Media type: Print
- Pages: 362
- ISBN: 978-0-7006-1698-5
- OCLC: 699586477
- Website: Official website

Hitler's Generals on Trial: The Last War Crimes Tribunal at Nuremberg is a 2010 book by Canadian historian Valerie Hébert dealing with the High Command Trial of 1947–1948. The book covers the criminal case against the defendants, all high-ranking officers of the armed forces of Nazi Germany, as well as the wider societal and historical implications of the trial. The book received generally positive reviews for its mastery of the subject and thorough assessment of the legacy of the trial.

== Contents ==
=== Premise ===
Hitler's Generals on Trial details the High Command Trial, officially known as "War Criminals before the Nuremberg Military Tribunals", which was part of the Subsequent Nuremberg trials. Hitler's Generals on Trial focuses on two goals set out for the trials. The first, a didactic goal, which attempted to use the trials as a learning experience for the German nation regarding the depth of the complicity of their armed forces, the Wehrmacht, in the criminality of the Nazi regime. The second goal involved obtaining justice for the victims by punishing those involved.

Handling the subject from an interdisciplinary perspective, Hebert addresses the issues of international military justice, post-war developments in West Germany, and how political considerations superseded the quest for justice. In this atmosphere the myth of the "clean Wehrmacht" thrived, and in the words of the author, the trial had "virtually no impact on German public consciousness".

=== Prosecution and defence cases ===
Using primary and secondary materials, Hébert discusses the proceedings themselves, the evolution of the American judicial policy towards war crimes, the preceding trials, and the post-conviction developments. Hébert focuses in particular on the cases against senior field commanders Hermann Hoth, Georg von Küchler, and Georg-Hans Reinhardt, who led armies and army groups on the Eastern Front and were responsible for mass war crimes and crimes against humanity. She also details the cases against two key members of the OKW, German military's supreme command: Walter Warlimont, who composed the Barbarossa Jurisdiction Order, and Hermann Reinecke, in charge of the prisoner of war regulations, which led to the deaths of millions of Soviet POWs.

In covering one tactic shared by defence counsels from different trials, Hébert reviewed a memorandum put forth at the Nuremberg Trial in 1945–1946. Co-authored by former chief of staff of the OKH (German Army High Command) Franz Halder and former field marshals Walter von Brauchitsch and Erich von Manstein, along with other senior military figures, the document aimed to portray the German armed forces as apolitical and largely innocent of the crimes committed by the Nazi regime. Hébert shows how that strategy was also adopted by the lead counsel for the defence in the High Command trial, Hans Laternser.

=== Conclusion ===
"While it is true that the trial helped to
develop and apply criminal law to political
atrocities, and insofar served justice,
the failure adequately to punish those
convicted undermined the whole project."

— Valerie Geneviève Hébert

Hébert implicates the court's greater pedagogical failure as the cause of its failure to enact justice. While evidence of the specific war crimes and crimes against humanity committed by the accused was damning, the book found that it was the defence that won the case in the court of Germany's public opinion. The German public proved to be too recalcitrant towards the idea of imposing consequences upon their military leaders. In a country where society has long-revered the military, the German public found the concept of punishment for its military leaders as anathema to their own personal sense of a moral, legal culture.

Those motivations brought about various campaigns conducted by the German clergy and the government of the new Federal Republic on behalf of the convicted, which ultimately impacted the trial's conclusion. Faced with their concerted lobbying efforts, the American sentence review and clemency program reduced or commuted many of the sentences, which according to Hébert, brought failure to both of the trial's goals. Former military officers were the first to be released, including those convicted in the High Command Case. With various areas of German society doing what it could to influence the sentences of those on trial, none of the defendants remained in prison after 1957. Nevertheless, none of those found guilty were ever publicly exonerated of their crimes.

== Reception ==
A review by historian Daniel Segesser in the Journal of Genocide Research finds the book a "welcome addition to this literature, [as it] focuses on a trial that has so far been neglected". According to Segasser, if Hébert had provided more information on the German military organization and function, she could have presented a clearer picture the Wehrmacht's inexorable ties to the Nazi regime's goals of conquest and annihilation. The review agrees with Hébert in that Americans did not fully achieve the objectives they had set out before the start of the case:

...but it must be remembered that the trials of German military figures between 1945 and 1949 brought to light many documents of inestimable value to historians (as in the Wehrmacht exhibition of the 1990s). Thus, although most of the crimes of the Wehrmacht were forgotten in the immediate wake of the proceedings, the didactic value of the High Command Trial was not completely lost.

Reviewing Hitler's Generals on Trial in Military Review, Mark Montesclaros of the Army Command and General Staff College describes the book's treatment of the political context of the trial and subsequent developments as one of its "greatest insights". He points out that American authorities in Germany were not only seeking justice but, at the same time, trying to rebuild the German society, conduct a de-Nazification program, and recruit West Germany into a military coalition in the face of the looming Cold War with the Soviet Union. Faced with these conflicting priorities, the Americans opted for the reconciliation with the former enemy, which included clemency programs for those convicted in war crimes trials. Mark Montesclaros "highly recommends" the book to those interested in international military justice and post-war developments in Germany.

Historian Alaric Searle notes the book's "success, with only 208 pages of text, [in] providing a readable, accessible, and tightly structured overview of an extremely complex case". He contrasts it with other literature on war crimes trials which he describes as "longwinded affairs, written by lawyers" and recommends Hitler's Generals on Trial for teaching purposes.

American scholar Jonathan Lurie, reviewing the book in H-Net, finds that it "breaks new ground" and is "strongly recommended". Comparing it to the 2008 collection of essays, Atrocities on Trial: Historical Perspectives on the Politics of Prosecuting War Crimes, edited by Patricia Heberer and Jürgen Matthäus, which covered a number of war crimes trials, Lurie notes the strength of Hébert's book in thoroughly analysing a single case and its outcomes and lessons. He goes on to describe the work as an "outstanding contribution" that asks "difficult questions" about justice, retribution, and atonement.

== Author ==
Valerie Hébert is an associate professor of history and interdisciplinary studies at Lakehead University, Canada. Her research and teaching include modern European history, Nazi Germany, the Holocaust, and genocide. Published by the University Press of Kansas in 2010, Hitler's Generals on Trial was Hébert's first major publication.

== See also ==
- Clean Wehrmacht
- Wehrmacht Exhibition
- The Wehrmacht: History, Myth, Reality
