= Hamburger Edition =

German publishing house

The Hamburger Edition is the publishing house of the Hamburg Institute for Social Research. It was established in the fall of 1994 with the aim of publishing results of the institute's scholarship with the broader public in mind. In its over 20-year history, the Hamburger Edition published monographs, essays, and books by more than five hundred authors, many of whom served as members of the Institute while others came from a range of related disciplines in the German-speaking world, and internationally.

In the spring of 1995 the Hamburger Edition published its first nine books which defined the publishing program maintained consistently until today. They were monographs on nationalism and xenophobia, violence, Stalinism, and anti-Semitism. Also in 1995, the Hamburger Edition published the catalogue (in a book form) for an exhibit "Crimes of the German Wehrmacht: Dimensions of a War of Annihilation, 1941-1944" (Verbrechen der Wehrmacht. Dimensionen des Vernichtungskriegs 1941-1944), organized by the institute.

== Authors ==
More than 500 authors have published books with Hamburger Edition or contributed to anthologies published by this publisher. In addition, there are further authors whose texts have appeared in the journal Mittelweg 36. These include, among others, Zygmunt Bauman, Heinz Bude, Robert Castel, Bernd Greiner, Gerd Hankel, Elizabeth Harvey, Ulrike Jureit, Wolfgang Kraushaar, Regina Mühlhäuser, Susan Neiman, Jan Philipp Reemtsma, Pierre Rosanvallon, and Michael Wildt.
