= Ulrike Jureit =

German cultural historian and social historian

Ulrike Jureit (born in 1964) is a German historian.

== Career ==
Jureit studied history, theology and social pedagogy from 1983 until 1989 at the Westfälische Wilhelms-Universität in Münster. From 1991 to 1995 she was a research assistant at the Neuengamme concentration camp. In 1998 she received her doctorate at the University of Hamburg. The topic of her work was Memory Patterns. On the Methodology of Life History Interviews with Survivors of the Concentration and Extermination Camps. Jureit then worked as a postdoctoral researcher at Bielefeld University and then supervised a research project within the framework of the University of Hamburg's special university program. She is a staff member at the Hamburg Institute for Social Research and has been a guest researcher at the Hamburg Foundation for the Promotion of Science and Culture since 2004.

Jureit played a major role in the so-called Second Wehrmachtsausstellung, in which War crimes of the Wehrmacht during the Second World War were thematized. The exhibition was presented from 2001 to 2004. It differed greatly from the first version, which had been the subject of extremely controversial discussion in the German public.

== Publications ==
- Das Leben wird vorwärts gelebt und rückwärts verstanden – mündlich erfragte Fallgeschichten als Quellen historischer Forschung. In Susanne Düwell, Nicolas Pethes (edit.): Fall – Fallgeschichte – Fallstudie. Theorie und Geschichte einer Wissensform. Frankfurt am Main u. a. 2014, pp. 227–241.
- Das Ordnen von Räumen. Territorium und Lebensraum im 19. und 20. Jahrhundert. Hamburg 2012.
- with Margrit Frölich and Christian Schneider (edit.): Das Unbehagen an der Erinnerung – Wandlungsprozesse im Gedenken an den Holocaust. Frankfurt 2012.
- with the Hamburg Institute for Social Research (edit.): Verbrechen der Wehrmacht. Dimensionen des Vernichtungskrieges 1941–1944. Ausstellungskatalog, conception Jan Philipp Reemtsma, Ulrike Jureit; Gesamtredaktion: Ulrike Jureit. Hamburg 2002.
- Konstruktion und Sinn. Methodische Überlegungen zu biographischen Sinnkonstruktionen. Oldenburg 1998 (PDF-Datei).
- In dubio contra reum? Über den Wunsch nach historischer Eindeutigkeit. In Musik & Ästhetik. 17th year, No. 67, 2013, pp. 9–21.
- Autobiographien: Rückfragen an ein gelebtes Leben. In Martin Sabrow (edit.): Autobiographische Aufarbeitung. Diktatur und Lebensgeschichte im 20. Jahrhundert. Leipzig 2012, pp. 149–157.
- Generation, Generationalität, Generationenforschung, Version 1.0. In Docupedia-Zeitgeschichte, published on 11 February 2010.
- as editor with Nikola Tietze: Postsouveräne Territorialität. Die Europäische Union und ihr Raum. Hamburger Edition, Hamburg 2015, ISBN 978-3-86854-287-5.
- Hoffnung auf Erfolg. Akteurszentrierte Handlungskonzepte in der Migrations- und Flüchtlingsforschung, in Zeithistorische Forschungen 15 (2018), pp. 509–522.
