= Felix Römer =

German historian

- Born: 1978 (age 47–48); Hamburg, West Germany
- Occupations: Historian, author

Academic background
- Education: University of Kiel

Academic work
- Institutions: German Historical Institute London
- Main interests: Modern European history; Military history; History of National Socialism
- Notable works: Research on the Commissar Order

Felix Römer (born 1978) is a German historian who specialises in the history of World War II. He has conducted pioneering research into the implementation of the Commissar Order by combat formations of the Wehrmacht and the attitudes of German soldiers based on the surreptitiously recorded conversations of prisoners of war held in Fort Hunt, Virginia, United States.

== Education and career ==
Römer was born in 1978 in Hamburg, West Germany. He studied history and literature at the University of Kiel and the University of Lyon. From 2004 to 2007, he worked on his doctoral thesis with funding from the Gerda Henkel Foundation. His research project focused on the Commissar Order and its implementation by formations of the Wehrmacht down to the divisional level during Operation Barbarossa, the 1941 invasion of the Soviet Union. He earned his PhD from the University of Kiel in 2007.

From 2007 to 2012, Römer worked as a research associate in the project headed by Sönke Neitzel of the History Department at the University of Mainz focused on war perception and collective biography. This project led to the publication of Soldaten: On Fighting, Killing and Dying: The Secret WWII Transcripts of German POWs by Neitzel and Harald Welzer in 2011. For this project Römer compiled 100,000 pages of comprehensive documentary material from the interrogation camp at Fort Hunt, Virginia, where about 3,000 German POWs were both interviewed formally and surreptitiously recorded while held there from 1942 to 1945. Based on this research, Römer published Kameraden – Die Wehrmacht von innen. (Comrades: The Wehrmacht from Within) in 2012. From 2012 to 2019 Römer was a researcher at the German Historical Institute London. Since 2019 he is working at the Humboldt University in Berlin.

== Research on the Commissar Order ==
Römer's book on the Commissar Order, published in 2008 in German as Der Kommissarbefehl. Wehrmacht und NS-Verbrechen an der Ostfront 1941/42 (The Commissar Order: The Wehrmacht and the Nazi Crimes on the Eastern Front, 1941–1942), was the first complete account of the implementation of the order by the combat formations of the Wehrmacht. Römer's research shows that 116 out of 137 German divisions on the Eastern Front filed reports detailing the killing of the Red Army's political commissars. As a result of the order, by May 1942, a total of at least 3,430 and possibly as many as 4,000 Commissars were murdered by regular Wehrmacht soldiers after surrendering.

Römer finds that the records "prove that Hitler's generals had executed his murderous orders without scruples or hesitations", contrary to the myth of a "clean" Wehrmacht. Historian Wolfram Wette, reviewing the book, notes that the sporadic objections to the order were merely pragmatic and that its cancellation in 1942 was "not a return to morality, but an opportunistic course correction". Wette concludes:

The Commissar Order, which has always had a particularly strong influence on the image of the Wehrmacht because of its obviously criminal character, has finally been clarified. Once again the observation has confirmed itself: the deeper the research penetrates into the military history, the gloomier the picture becomes.

== Kameraden ==
Römer's 2012 book Kameraden (published in English as Comrades in 2019) was based on the surreptitiously recorded conversations of German prisoners of war held in Fort Hunt, United States. The book analyses the overall experience of soldiers in the Wehrmacht through these recordings.

Anti-semitism was systematic and the Holocaust was an "open secret" among the soldiers, though primarily as rumour. While there were some supporters of the killing of Jews, the majority rejected it. While a small group of POWs, who Römer identified as having a "fanatical worldview", even boasted of war crimes, for most of the soldiers there were apparently limits. The book finds these included violence against women and children or against defenseless Soviet POWs. But in the reality of war, Römer concludes, group dynamics were often stronger than moral scruples.

Reviewers had differing opinions on what Kameraden said about the motives of German soldiers. MacGregor Knox, reviewing the book in Sehepunkte, said that the book "challenge[s] head-on the ideology-free model of German combat behavior proposed in Soldaten" and "Römer has little patience with this quasi-apologetic conjecture or with the pseudo-anthropological platitudes about warfare in general that accompany it". Conversely, Ludger Tewes in Historische Zeitschrift felt that Römer showed that ideology "had little concrete influence in the field". Focus' review felt that while Römer agreed with Soldaten's view that the average German soldier was "only slightly politicized", he demonstrated that most soldiers were pro-Hitler to some degree.

== Selected works ==
=== In English ===
- Römer, Felix (2012). "The Wehrmacht in the War of Ideologies: The Army and Hitler's Criminal Orders on the Eastern Front". In Alex J. Kay; Jeff Rutherford; David Stahel (eds.). Nazi Policy on the Eastern Front, 1941: Total War, Genocide, and Radicalization. University of Rochester Press. ISBN 978-1-58046-407-9.
- Römer, Felix (2019). Comrades. The Wehrmacht from within. Oxford University Press, ISBN 978-0-19879-709-8.

=== In German ===
- Der Kommissarbefehl. Wehrmacht und NS-Verbrechen an der Ostfront 1941/42. Schöningh, Paderborn 2008, ISBN 978-3-506-76595-6
- Kameraden. Die Wehrmacht von innen. Munich: Piper Verlag. 2012. ISBN 978-3-492-05540-6.
- Alfred Andersch desertiert. Fahnenflucht und Literatur (1944–1952). Verbrecher Verlag, Berlin 2015. With Jörg Döring and Rolf Seubert ISBN 978-3-943-16798-6
