= Hermann Reinecke =

Nazi general and war criminal (1888–1973)

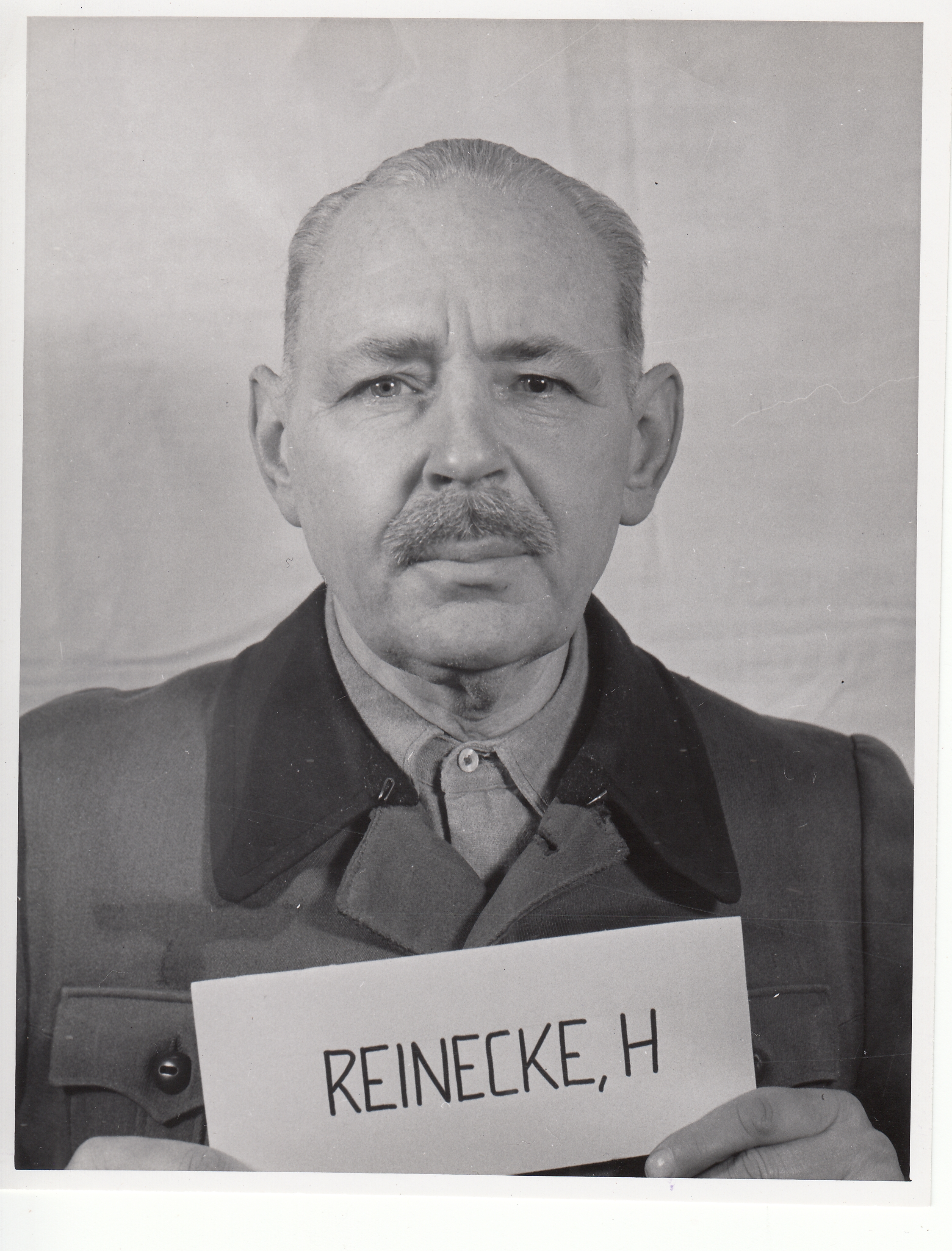
- Mugshot of Reinecke, 1947
- Born: 14 February 1888; Wittenberg, German Empire
- Died: 10 October 1973 (aged 85); Hamburg, West Germany
- Status: Deceased
- Convictions: War crimes Crimes against humanity
- Trial: High Command Trial
- Penalty: Life imprisonment
- Military career
- Allegiance: German Empire; Weimar Germany; Nazi Germany
- Branch: Reichsheer; Reichswehr; Wehrmacht
- Service years: 1905–1945
- Rank: General of the Infantry
- Commands: Chief of General Office of the Wehrmacht OKW
- Conflicts: World War I World War II
- Awards: Iron Cross, 1st and 2nd class

Karl Rudolf Ernst Auguste Hermann Reinecke (14 February 1888 – 10 October 1973) generally known as Hermann Reinecke was a German general and war criminal during the Nazi era. As head of the General Office of the Armed Forces in the OKW (Supreme Command of the Wehrmacht) during World War II, he was a major contributor to the prisoner-of-war policy that resulted in the deaths of approx. 3.3 million Soviet prisoners. Reinecke was tried, convicted and sentenced to life imprisonment at the High Command Trial.

== Military career ==
Reinecke joined the German Imperial Army as a cadet in March 1905. He served throughout World War I during which he was awarded the Iron Cross first class and he was promoted to captain in 1916. He then continued his military service in the Reichswehr with the Army Office of Administration, an infantry regiment and the Reich Defence Ministry in Berlin. He served in the Wehrmacht, providing political training on behalf of the Nazi leadership.

In January 1939, Reinecke was promoted to major general as head of an office in the OKW and appointed head of the General Office of the Armed Forces at OKW (Allgemeines Wehrmachtamt, AWA) in August 1940. Reinecke was also head of the office for the Nationalsozialistische Führungsoffiziere (NSFO), which consisted of Nazi officers charged with political propaganda in the Wehrmacht. Major Karl August Meinel was shifted into the Führerreserve on 1 August 1942, because on 13 January 1942 he wrote a critical report to Hermann Reinecke on the segregation and execution of Soviet prisoners of war in prison camp Stalag VII A by the Gestapo and the Sicherheitsdienst SD (security service) of the Reichsführer SS (Heinrich Himmler). In 1942 Reinecke was promoted to General of the Infantry.

=== 20th July Plot ===
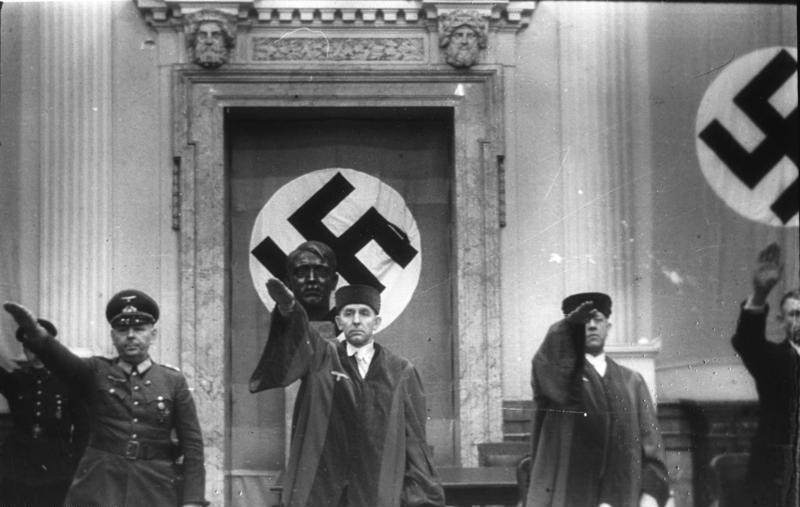
Reinecke (left), pictured with Roland Freisler (center) at the People's Court, 1944

Following the 20 July plot coup attempt, Joseph Goebbels tasked Reinecke with retaking the Bendlerblock, and he was then a lay judge during the People's Court trials of the conspirators.

== Trial and conviction ==
In the High Command Trial, as part of the Nuremberg Trials after World War II, Reinecke was convicted of war crimes and crimes against humanity. As head of the General Office of the Armed Forces, he was responsible for the creation and implementation of the POW policy that resulted in the deaths of approx. 3.3 million Soviet prisoners of war. The judgement of the International Military Tribunal refers to 8 September 1941 regulations for the treatment of Soviet prisoners of war in all prisoner of war camps, signed by General Reinecke, the head of the prisoner of war department of the High Command. These orders stated:

The Bolshevist soldier has therefore lost all claim to treatment as an honourable opponent, in accordance with the Geneva Convention (...) The order for ruthless and energetic action must be given at the slightest indication of insubordination, especially in the case of Bolshevist fanatics. Insubordination, active or passive resistance, must be broken immediately by force of arms (bayonets, butts and firearms) ... . Anyone carrying out the order who does not use his weapons, or does so with insufficient energy, is punishable (...) Prisoners of war attempting escape are to be fired on without previous challenge. No warning shot must ever be fired.... The use of arms against prisoners of war is as a rule legal.

Reinecke was sentenced to life imprisonment. His sentence was reviewed by the "Peck Panel". He was released in October 1954.

== Awards and decorations ==
- Iron Cross (1914), 1st and 2nd class
- Knight's Cross of the House Order of Hohenzollern with swords
- Hanseatic Cross of Hamburg
- Military Merit Cross of Austria-Hungary, 3rd class with war decoration
- Honour Cross of the World War 1914/1918
- War Merit Cross, 1st and 2nd class with swords

== Bibliography ==
- Hebert, Valerie (2010). Hitler's Generals on Trial: The Last War Crimes Tribunal at Nuremberg. Lawrence, Kansas: University Press of Kansas. ISBN 978-0-7006-1698-5.
- Stahel, David (2015). The Battle for Moscow. Cambridge, UK: Cambridge University Press. ISBN 978-1-107-08760-6.
- Stahel, David (2009). Operation Barbarossa and Germany's Defeat in the East. Cambridge, UK: Cambridge University Press. ISBN 978-0-521-76847-4.
- Webb, James Jack (2025). Generals and Admirals of the Third Reich: For Country or Fuehrer. Vol. 3: P–Z. Havertown, PA: Casemate Publishers. ISBN 978-1-952-71518-1.
