= Hannes Heer =

German historian

Hans Georg Heer
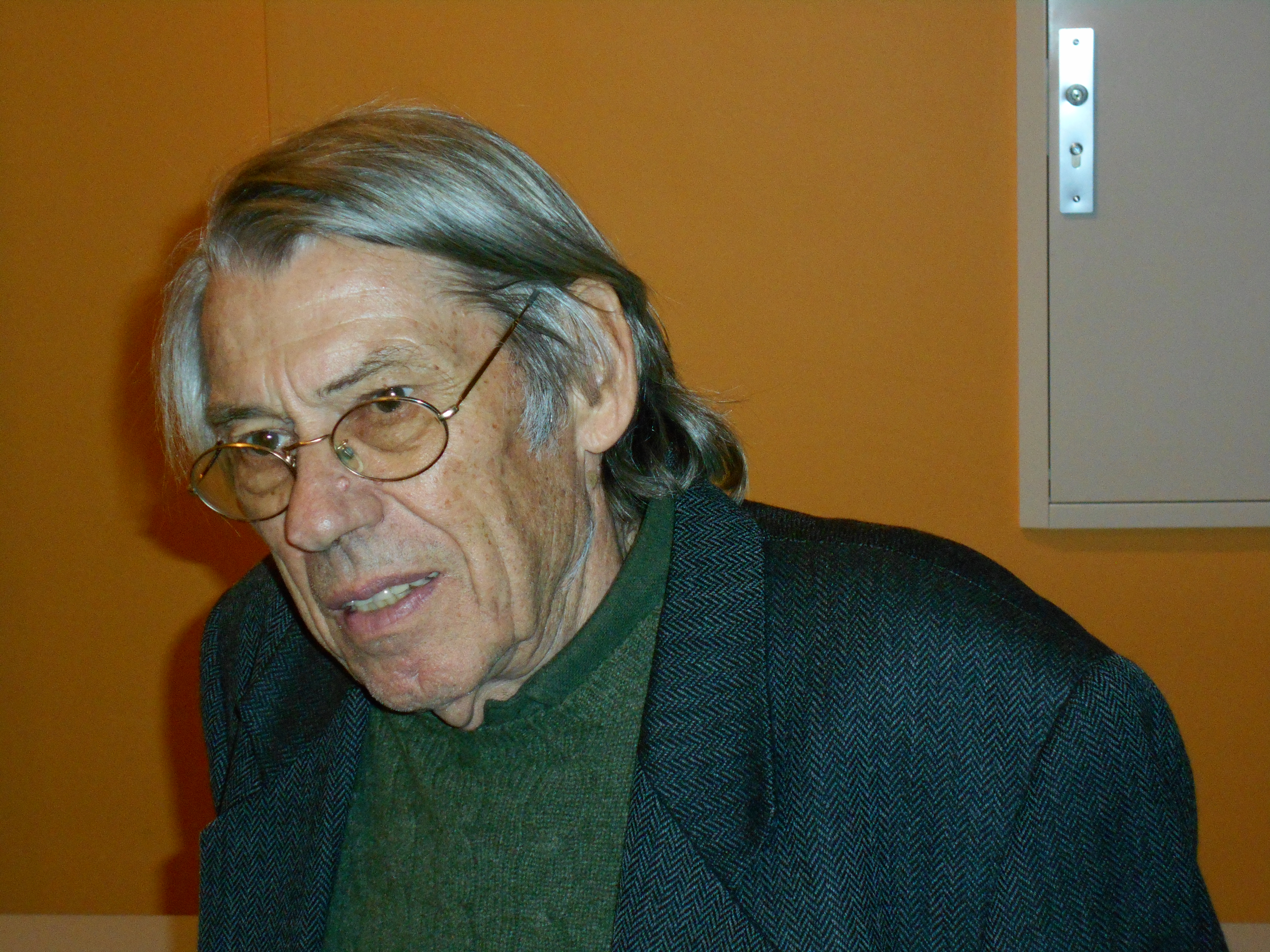
- Heer in 2017
- Born: 16 March 1941 (age 85); Wissen, Rhine Province, Germany
- Other name: Hannes Heer
- Occupation: Historian
- Known for: Wehrmachtsausstellung

Hans Georg Heer (known as Hannes) (born 16 March 1941) is a German historian, chiefly known for the Wehrmachtsausstellung (German: "Wehrmacht Exhibition") in the 1990s. While controversial at that time, the exhibition is nowadays widely credited with opening the eyes of the German public to the war crimes of the Wehrmacht committed on the Eastern Front during World War II. Having been suspended in 1999 for review, the exhibit reopened in 2001 under the name "Crimes of the German Wehrmacht: Dimensions of a War of Annihilation 1941–1944". The exhibitions were instrumental in the debunking of the myth of the clean Wehrmacht in Germany.

== Education and student activism ==
Heer was born in Wissen, Rhine Province. He studied literature and history, and passed his state examination in 1968 at the University of Bonn. From 1970 to 1972 he completed postgraduate studies in economics and economic history, at the University of Bonn. As a student, he became a member of Sozialistischer Deutscher Studentenbund. Because of his activities in the (SDS), he was not admitted to the school service. He worked as a radio writer, in the 1970s and as a lecturer at the University of Bremen, and from 1980 to 1985 as a dramaturge and director at the Deutsches Schauspielhaus in Hamburg and the Städtische Bühnen in Cologne.

== Wehrmacht Exhibition ==
In 1993, he was employed by the Hamburg Institute for Social Research and became known for the controversial Wehrmachtsausstellung (Wehrmacht Exhibition) that focused on German war crimes and atrocities during World War II. The Polish historian Bogdan Musial pointed out in an article published in 1999 that a number of photos that allegedly portrayed Wehrmacht war crimes in reality were photos of Soviet war crimes committed by the Red Army, and also stated that around half of all photos used in the exhibition had nothing to do with war crimes. In 1995, military historian Rolf-Dieter Müller, scientific director of the German Armed Forces Military History Research Office, stated that the exhibition was deliberately misleading. After criticisms about incorrect attribution and captioning of some of the images in the exhibition, the exhibition was withdrawn in 1999 for review. Heer no longer participated in Wehrmachtsausstellung because, he could not agree with Jan Philipp Reemtsma on a concept for the new version. Herr was a fellow of the Hamburg Institute for Social Research until August 2000.

The display was suspended pending review of its content by a committee of historians. The committee's report in 2000 stated that accusations of forged materials were not justified, but some of the exhibit's documentation had inaccuracies. About one per cent of photographs had been incorrectly attributed: "A committee of historians, while confirming the fundamental thesis of the display, discovered that 20 of the 1400 photographs depicted Soviet crimes, that is, murders by NKVD, rather than the acts of German soldiers." The committee recommended that the exhibition be reopened in revised form, presenting the material and, as far as possible, leaving the formation of conclusions to the exhibition's viewers. The revised exhibition was named Verbrechen der Wehrmacht. Dimensionen des Vernichtungskrieges 1941–1944. ("Crimes of the German Wehrmacht: Dimensions of a War of Annihilation 1941–1944"). It traveled from 2001 to 2004. In 1997, Heer was awarded the Carl von Ossietzky Medal, for his work with the Wehrmachtsausstellung.

== Further exhibitions and publications ==
Since leaving HIS, Heer has been working as a freelance writer, editor, director and exhibition organizer. His main topics are the politics of remembrance and the construction of history, in particular dealing with the Nazi era . In the works "Vom Verschwinden der Täter" (2004) and "Hitler war's" (2005) he examined the tendency to present the history of National Socialism as a story of "acts without perpetrators". A current focus of his work is research into anti-Semitism in music. Starting in 2006, Heer investigated the expulsion and persecution of artistic and technical personnel in Nazi Germany for racial and political reasons as part of the exhibition project “ Silent Voices ” using the opera houses in Hamburg, Berlin, Stuttgart, Darmstadt and Dresden . He also reconstructed the history of the defamation and marginalization of Jewish artists at the Bayreuth Festival from 1876 to 1945 and recalled the fate of 51 persecuted people after 1933. Twelve of them were murdered. The exhibition has been shown at Green Hill in Bayreuth in 2012.

== Publications ==
- Tote Zonen – Die deutsche Wehrmacht an der Ostfront, 1999, ISBN 3-930908-51-4
- Vom Verschwinden der Täter, 2004, ISBN 3-7466-8135-9
- The discursive construction of history: remembering the Wehrmacht's war of annihilation / edited by Hannes Heer ... [et al.]; translated from the German by Steven Fligelstone, 2008 ISBN 0-230-01323-6
- Hitler war's. Die Befreiung der Deutschen von ihrer Vergangenheit, 2005, ISBN 3-351-02601-3
- Literatur und Erinnerung. Die Nazizeit als Familiengeheimnis, in: Zeitschrift für Geschichtswissenschaft, 53. Jg., Heft 9, September 2005, S. 809–835
- als Herausgeber: „Stets zu erschiessen sind Frauen, die in der Roten Armee dienen“: Geständnisse deutscher Kriegsgefangener über ihren Einsatz an der Ostfront, 1995, ISBN 3-930908-06-9
- In the heart of darkness. Victor Klemperer as a chronicler of the Nazi era. Aufbau-Verlag, Berlin 1997, ISBN 3-351-02456-8
- It was Hitler. The liberation of the Germans from their past. Aufbau-Verlag, Berlin 2005, ISBN 3-351-02601-3
- Hannes Heer; Klaus Naumann, eds. (2004). War of Extermination: The German Military In World War II. New York: Berghahn Books. ISBN 1-57181-232-6.
