= Hamburg Institute for Social Research =

Independent private foundation in Germany

- Abbreviation: HIS
- Formation: 1984
- Founder: Jan Philipp Reemtsma
- Type: Research institute
- Purpose: Social research
- Location: Hamburg, Germany
- Coordinates: 53°34′09″N 9°59′41″E
- Director: Wolfgang Knöbl
- Website: www.his-online.de

The Hamburg Institute for Social Research (German: Hamburger Institut für Sozialforschung; abbreviated HIS) is an independent private foundation whose scholarship is focused on both contemporary history and the social sciences. Founded in 1984 by Jan Philipp Reemtsma, it employs about 60 people with roughly 50% working in the research fields of sociology and history. The institute promotes dialogue, primarily between the humanities, in the fields of empirical social research, historical analysis, and the development of social science theory. It constists of four research groups: "Democracy and Statehood," "Macro-Violence," "Monetary Sovereignty," and "Sociology of Law."

The institute publishes a bimonthly journal called Mittelweg 36 and has its own publishing house, Hamburger Edition and an archive and a library.

In January 2024, Reemtsma announced his intention to close the HIS in 2028, when the term of office of the recent director Wolfgang Knöbl ends.

HIS publicly wide known projects was the exhibition "War of Annihilation: Crimes of the Wehrmacht 1941–44". An extensive archive on the history of protest movements in the Federal Republic of Germany produced major publications, including works on the student movement and the RAF.

== History ==
=== Beginnings ===
Jan Philipp Reemtsma founded the HIS in Hamburg in 1984 with funds from his inheritance and was a member of the executive board from its foundation until 2015. In addition to Reemtsma, Helmut Dahmer, Ernest Mandel, Margarete Mitscherlich-Nielsen, Jakob Moneta, and Alice Schwarzer formed the first advisory board. Initially, the HIS only funded individual projects and was theoretically oriented towards psychoanalytic sociology, which Reemtsma later said had been the wrong direction. In the academic milieu, HIS was initially ridiculed, but established itself as an important contributor to social research over the years.

== Mittelweg 36 ==
The institutes journal was first published in 1992 and allows readers to follow ongoing research projects at the institute. In its first decade the journal has garnered interest not only in the academic community but also has a number of non-academic readers. It is published six times a year academic publisher of the HIS the Hamburger Edition, which was founded in 1994.

== Wehrmachtsausstellung ==
In 1995 the institute began an exhibition titled Wehrmachtsausstellung which toured Germany until 1999. The tour detailed the War crimes of the Wehrmacht and helped break the Myth of the clean Wehrmacht in Germany. It was designed by Hannes Heer.

Initially, the Wehrmachtsausstellung was only intended as a smaller exhibition alongside a larger one. However, it quickly sparked intense debates among the public and in the media. On 13 March 1997, the German Bundestag also discussed the exhibition, as did some state parliaments. After criticism arose, among other things, about false information regarding the attribution of some of the photographs shown, the HIS withdrew the exhibition at the end of 1999. A commission of historians examined the allegations and found that the criticism of the exhibition was at least partly justified. The exhibition contained "factual errors", "inaccuracies and carelessness in the use of material" and "overly sweeping and suggestive statements". However, the criticism regarding the attribution of the images was justified for fewer than 20 of the 1,433 photos. In response, the HIS designed a new exhibition on the subject, which was shown from 2001 to 2004. In retrospect, the historian Hans-Ulrich Thamer said that the presentation had brought about a "change in consciousness" in Germany; it had "destroyed the legend of the clean Wehrmacht".

== Research topics ==
The forms that the "legacy of violence" of the Second World War took during the Cold War were the subject of a comprehensive research project at the HIS. In this context, the institute organised a series of eight conferences between 2003 and 2011, and six anthologies were published by the Hamburg Edition under the series title "Studien zum Kalten Krieg" (Studies on the Cold War) between 2006 and 2013.

The HIS also provided contributions to the controversies surrounding the 1968 movement and left-wing terrorist groups, in particular through the work of Wolfgang Kraushaar.

From 2013 to 2015, the scientific work was organised into three research groups: "Crisis and Transformation of Empires", "Postwar Periods" and "Future Production".

In 2015 Wolfgang Knöbl took over as director of the institute shifting the research focus more towards southern Europe. The new direction in terms of content was taken with the establishment of further research groups, including the research group on "Democracy and Statehood". The group focuses on the current problems of democracy, especially in southern Europe. Continuity exists above all in the research on violence.

More recent research groups are "Monetary Sovereignty" and "Legal Sociology".

In February 2025, the HIS held a workshop titled "Politics of demarcation and the radical right in post-war Europe: Defining what is right".

== Scholarships ==
The HIS offered a PhD level scholarship-funded research until November 2018. Recipients received a monthly amount of 1,400 Euro as well as additional funding for travel, health care, books and for their dependants.

== Planned closure in 2028 ==
In January 2024, the institute announced that it would cease its work when Wolfgang Knöbl's term of office ends in 2028. The publisher Hamburg Edition and the journal Mittelweg 36 are also to be discontinued. The planned closure was widely reported in the media. There were also many reactions in the historical and social sciences. In a joint statement, the German Sociological Association and the German Historians' Association emphasised the importance of the institute and its various activities. Both reject the closure and call for "constructive consideration" of "how the institute's research and infrastructure can be meaningfully continued".

== Siegfried Landshut Prize ==
On 4 October 2018, the HIS awarded the first Siegfried Landshut Prize, which is presented annually. The prize is named in memory of the German political scientist and political sociologist Siegfried Landshut, who died 50 years earlier. It is awarded to researchers working in an interdisciplinary way for their outstanding work in the fields in which the HIS is also active. The first recipient of the award was the British sociologist Michael Mann. In 2019, the prize went to the US-American sociologist George Steinmetz, and in 2020 to the US-American historian Isabel Hull. In 2021, the prize was awarded to sociologist Marion Fourcade, and in 2022 to sociologist Mike Savage. Monica Prasad is the recipient of the 2023 award. Martin Conway won the award in 2026.

== Media response ==
Die Tageszeitung wrote in 2009 on the occasion of the 25th anniversary of its founding that HIS had "developed into one of the most influential intellectual centres in the Federal Republic of Germany". The Neue Zürcher Zeitung made a similar assessment, stating that HIS was "among the institutes in Germany working in the fields of history and sociology, the one with the greatest public impact and the critical social developments". The Deutschlandfunk radio station pointed out the scientific achievements: the HIS had "made a name for itself above all with research on violence in the 20th century". The Deutsche Welle radio station stated that the HIS had an "excellent reputation", many of its researchers "teach at universities in Germany and abroad and some hold visiting professorships. A scholarship or a position at the HIS is considered an important building block for the career of young scientists." In 2012, the Hamburger Abendblatt also wrote that the HIS is now "accepted as an independent voice in the scientific community", after being critically eyed by universities in its early years.

== Bibliography ==
- Bartov, Omer (13 February 2003). Germany's War and the Holocaust. Ithaca: Cornell University Press. ISBN 978-0-8014-8681-4.
- Bankier, David; Mikhman, Dan (2008). Holocaust Historiography in Context. Jerusalem: Berghahn Books. ISBN 978-965-308-326-4.
