= Hans Laternser =

German lawyer; Nuremberg Trial defense attorney

- Born: August 3, 1908; Diedenhofen, German Empire
- Died: July 21, 1969 (aged 60); Frankfurt am Main, West Germany
- Occupation: Lawyer
- Known for: Defence counsel at the Nuremberg Trials; lead defence attorney in the High Command Trial

Hans Laternser (3 August 1908 in Diedenhofen – 21 July 1969 in Frankfurt am Main) was a German lawyer who specialised in Anglo-Saxon law. In the immediate aftermath of the Second World War, that made him especially qualified to defend Germans prosecuted for war crimes by the Allied military tribunals, including the High Command Trial. He had represented several defendants at the Nuremberg Trials, such as former Field Marshals Albert Kesselring and Erich von Manstein.

Laternser played a prominent role in the High Command Trial, one of the Subsequent Nuremberg Trials, a series of court proceedings held in front of the United States military tribunals. He represented Wilhelm von Leeb, a former field marshal who had been in command of Army Group North during the invasion of the Soviet Union, Operation Barbarossa. Laternser acted as the de facto lead defence counsel for the entire group of defendants, who were former high-ranking personnel in the Wehrmacht of Nazi Germany. Often representing other parties in matters of procedure, Laternser defended the overall "decency" of the German officer corps, which Laternser interpreted to have displayed respect for the laws of war.

The defence attributed the actions of the German military towards civilians, hostages and partisans to battle conditions and military necessity. Addressing the criminal orders Leeb and other defendants had passed on, Laternser claimed that Leeb was a humane soldier who had neither seen nor transmitted such orders and had no opportunity to countermand them. He claimed that Leeb knew nothing of the activities of the Einsatzgruppen, the mobile SS death squads that were tasked with the murder of Jews, communists and Soviet prisoners-of-war in his area of command. Laternser further claimed that Leeb had had no jurisdiction to stop the death squads even if he had known about them.
