= David Stahel =

New Zealand historian, author, and lecturer

- Born: 1975 (age 50–51); Wellington, New Zealand
- Occupation: Senior lecturer in history

Academic background
- Education: King's College London, Humboldt University of Berlin

Academic work
- Era: 20th century
- Institutions: University of New South Wales
- Main interests: Modern European history; military history
- Notable works: Books on the military history of Nazi Germany

David Stahel (born 1975 in Wellington, New Zealand) is a historian, author and senior lecturer in history at the University of New South Wales. He specialises in German military history of World War II. Stahel has authored several books on the military operations of the first six months of the Eastern Front, including on the launching of Operation Barbarossa, the Battle of Kiev (1941) and the Battle for Moscow.

== Education and career ==
Stahel completed an honours degree at Monash University and Boston College. He has an MA in War Studies from King's College London and a PhD in 2007 from the Humboldt University of Berlin. He joined the University of New South Wales Canberra in 2012.

== Military historian of Nazi Germany ==
Stahel has authored several books on the military operations on the Eastern Front, including Operation Barbarossa, the Battle of Kiev (1941) and the Battle of Moscow; all books were published by Cambridge University Press. Reviewing Stahel's Kiev 1941: Hitler's Battle for Supremacy in the East for the New Republic, the historian Richard Evans notes that "the story of the Battle of Kiev has been told many times, but seldom in such detail as it is in David Stahel’s book", at the same time "convey[ing] extremely complex military action with exemplary clarity". The reviewer writes:

Unlike more traditional military historians, Stahel is acutely aware of the wider context of the action, from Hitler’s overall aims for the war to the importance of logistics for the outcome; from the murderous racism and ruthless pragmatism with which the German leaders, military as well as political, condemned so many Soviet civilians to starve and so many Jewish inhabitants to terrible death, to the postwar disputes among historians and retired generals over Hitler’s strategy.

Evans commends Stahel for his "refreshing realism" in not "following traditional military historians’ often overly positive and simplistic descriptions of 'great' generals and 'decisive' battles" and exploring "convincingly if not entirely originally" how the foundations of the German war efforts were already beginning to crumble by the time of the victory at Kiev heralded in Nazi propaganda as decisive.

== Publications ==
=== Books ===
- Operation Barbarossa and Germany's Defeat in the East (Cambridge University Press, Cambridge, 2009). ISBN 9780521768474
- Kiev 1941. Hitler's Battle for Supremacy in the East (Cambridge University Press, Cambridge, 2012). ISBN 9781107014596
- Nazi Policy on the Eastern Front, 1941: Total War, Genocide, and Radicalization (ed., with Alex J. Kay and Jeff Rutherford) (Rochester, NY: University of Rochester Press, 2012). ISBN 9781580464079
- Operation Typhoon. Hitler's March on Moscow (Cambridge University Press, Cambridge, 2013). ISBN 9781107035126
- The Battle for Moscow (Cambridge University Press, Cambridge, 2015). ISBN 9781107087606
- Joining Hitler's Crusade: European Nations and the Invasion of the Soviet Union (ed.) (Cambridge University Press, Cambridge, 2017). ISBN 9781108225281
- Mass Violence in Nazi-Occupied Europe (ed., with Alex J. Kay) (Indiana University Press, Bloomington, 2018). ISBN 9780253036803
- Retreat from Moscow (Farrar, Straus and Giroux, New York, 2019). ISBN 9780374249526
- Hitler's Panzer Generals: Guderian, Hoepner, Reinhardt and Schmidt Unguarded (Cambridge University Press, 2023). ISBN 9781009282819

=== Essays ===
- 'Radicalizing Warfare: The German Command and the Failure of Operation Barbarossa' in Alex J. Kay, Jeff Rutherford and David Stahel (eds.), Nazi Policy on the Eastern Front, 1941: Total War, Genocide, and Radicalization (Rochester, NY: University of Rochester Press, 2012), pp. 19–44.
