= Panzer Leader (book) =

1951 autobiography of Heinz Guderian

- Cover of the Ballantine Book abridged version
- Author: Heinz Guderian
- Original title: Erinnerungen eines Soldaten
- Language: German
- Genre: War novel, Autobiography
- Publication date: 1951
- Publication place: Germany
- English publication date: Michael Joseph, E. P. Dutton, 1952
- Media type: Print
- OCLC: 3596228

Panzer Leader (German: Erinnerungen eines Soldaten, lit. 'Memories of a Soldier') is an autobiography by German General Heinz Guderian, written during his imprisonment by the Allies after the Second World War.

The most prominent English language version is the 1952 translation by Constantine Fitzgibbon published in the United Kingdom by Michael Joseph and the United States by E. P. Dutton, with a foreword by B. H. Liddell Hart. The Da Capo Press editions have an additional introduction by Kenneth Macksey. Panzer Leader and its subsequent editions sold over 180,000 copies worldwide by the 1970s. It eventually reached its 18th printing in Germany in 2003.

== Themes ==
Panzer Leader acted as a memoir for Guderian to provide insight to various events that Guderian was involved in before and during the Second World War, providing his own comments and thoughts for each event. The most prominent themes discussed by Guderian are his involvement in the creation of Germany's armoured forces in the 1930s and subsequent operations on the Eastern Front. The topics discussed by Guderian in Panzer Leader include:

=== Pre-War ===
- Formation of the armoured forces (1930s)
- Anschluss – Germany's annexation of Austria (1938)
- Munich Agreement – Germany's annexation of the Sudetenland (1938)
- Planning of the Invasion of Poland (early 1939)

=== During WW2 ===
- Invasion of Poland (1939)
- Battle of France (1940)
- Planning and involvement in Operation Barbarossa – Germany's invasion of the Soviet Union (1941)
- Eastern Front (1942–1945)
- July 20th plot (1944)
- References to other theatres –Africa, Italy, and the Western Front (1942–1945)

== Analysis of themes ==
=== On the Eastern Front ===
The majority of Panzer Leader was written on the Eastern Front since Guderian's wartime service and command were mainly against the Soviet Union, focusing primarily on German armoured formations and operations. Guderian's time as Acting Chief of General Staff in the German Army High Command (from July 1944 to March 1945) was also documented where he worked to prevent a total collapse of the Eastern Front, lamenting the fact that the front was "tottering on the edge of an abyss".

Another prominent period discussed in Panzer Leader is November–December 1941, detailing the failures and setbacks faced by the German Army in their advancements during Operation Barbarossa. These included Army Group South's failure in capturing Rostov-on-Don, and the stalling of Army Group Center (which Guderian was a part of) before Moscow. Guderian describes the cold winter faced by the German army in 1941 where German equipment and machinery were rendered inoperable and increasing casualties due to freezing conditions, and the inability of contemporary German anti-tank guns to counter the newly deployed Soviet T-34 tanks.

=== On the conduct of the war ===
Amid his recounts of the war, Guderian in Panzer Leader also critiques the way Adolf Hitler conducted the war and how Guderian and other German generals opposed Hitler on grounds of his "wastefulness and impulsive methods".

=== On the July 20 plot ===
Guderian offers his thoughts and attitudes with regards to the assassination attempt of Adolf Hitler by several senior German officers and generals. Guderian wrote in Panzer Leader that he "'refuses to accept murder in any form. Our Christian religion forbids it in the clearest possible terms. I cannot therefore approve of the plan of assassination. Apart from this religious reason, I must say also that neither the internal nor the external political situation was conducive to a successful coup d’etat". Guderian also wrote comments on several of the co-conspirators of the plot: he reprimanded Dr Carl Friedrich Goerdeler for his "security carelessness"; referred to Generalfeldmarschall Erwin von Witzleben as "a sick man"; criticised Generals Ludwig Beck, Erich Hoepner and Friedrich Olbricht on their inability to properly organise and cope with the "special circumstances"; and remained ambivalent in his views of General Friedrich Fromm and the "impulsive" Colonel Claus von Stauffenberg.

== Role in the 'Clean Wehrmacht' myth ==
In the 1950s, less attention was placed on the recent history of the defeated Wehrmacht by German historians and scholars, leaving the responsibility of the Wehrmacht's history and subsequent recounting to former German generals under the guidance of the American Historical Division. In doing so, original Wehrmacht sources were closed off to the public and only made accessible to American researchers and German generals in hopes of restricting German military knowledge only for the United States. Such efforts were also directed in hopes of creating a positive public image of German soldiers and subsequently garner support for the rearmament of West Germany as an ally of the United States.

It was during this period when Guderian wrote Panzer Leader while incarcerated. It was through the creation of Guderian's image as a "professional, imaginative and skilled soldier who perfectly knew the dangers of the threats from the east [the Soviets]" that helped complement broader efforts by former German generals and the United States in creating a professional image of the Wehrmacht that was independent of Hitler's ideology – the myth of a 'clean Wehrmacht'. Guderian was deemed fortunate as prominent individuals who would have been able to disprove or dispute Guderian's memoirs had been killed-in-action or executed during the Nuremberg Trials. It would be in the 1960s when the original sources were released to the German federal archives for public use that publications of alternative perspectives to the idea of the 'clean Wehrmacht' could be made, first in Germany then overseas. Along with the writings of other German generals like Franz Halder, Panzer Leader would eventually enter into discourses on the validity and authenticity of post-war memoirs to act as historical sources and how they shaped post-war public opinion.

== Reception ==
After its publication and translation into English in 1952, Panzer Leader became popular in the United States and the United Kingdom throughout the 1950s, subsequently being translated into other languages and published across other countries worldwide, such as Brazil, Argentina, Yugoslavia, and the Soviet Union. As a post-war memoir, Panzer Leader brought public attention to Guderian as a distinguished armour officer and the "father of the German Panzer arm", leading to the creation of a 'Guderian myth' that gave him the title as Germany's renowned 'Panzer General' – a myth that still remains prominent to this day. The book has been described by American historian Albert Norman in 1953 as offering little in terms of analysis of contemporary debates surrounding the German conduct of war but rather more on "a dispute about responsibility for failure". It was nonetheless applauded and recommended for keen students of early armoured warfare and enthusiasts of Guderian's wartime career.

=== Opinions by the U.S. Military ===
Reviews of Panzer Leader written by U.S. military personnel published in the U.S. Naval War College Review quarterly offer positive comments on the book for providing an insight to the future of armoured warfare, especially in the period of the Cold War, and the inner workings of the Nazi dictatorship during the war. One review written by U.S. Marine Corps Colonel Theodore L. Gatchel in 1983 praised Panzer Leader as one of the few books written by former Wehrmacht generals that offered the best insights to the functioning of the German army during the war. Gatchel also claims the importance of the "military classics" written by former German generals (referring to Panzer Leader by Guderian and Lost Victories by Erich von Manstein) for the U.S. military in the 1980s on the rationale that these generals had fought against the United States' potential adversary in an impending global war – the Soviet Union, and would thus be able to provide valuable lessons for future military operations.

Gatchel drew similarities in Guderian and Manstein's experiences with that of contemporary U.S. military policies and strategies: extensive use of "retrograde operations", the desire of both armies to utilise "maneuver warfare", and the political limitations imposed on military commanders in how warfare was to be conducted. According to Gatchel, Hitler's orders in disallowing the surrender of territory for possible tactical advantages during the Second World War mirrored the perceptions of contemporary "Allied political leaders who understandably do not want to trade their nations' territory for the time and space needed to conduct the fluid style of defense [i.e., maneuver warfare] advocated by Guderian and von Manstein." While still acknowledging the exaggeration seen in both Guderian and Manstein's memoirs on their disagreements with Hitler, Panzer Leader and Lost Victories remained praised for the ability of such books to offer practical lessons for the U.S. military.

=== Criticisms ===
Criticisms of Panzer Leader began to take shape during the 1970s when historians such as Williamson Murray, James Corum, and Robert Citino began casting doubt on Guderian's brilliance as Germany's premier armour theorist. This growing scepticism was fuelled by the increasing availability and access to English-translated historical sources on the foundations of Germany's armoured forces, and the exposure of prominent British army captain and military historian B. H. Liddell Hart's manipulation of historical recounts of military debates – including the writing of Panzer Leader. Other critiques of Guderian's legacy presented in Panzer Leader involved questioning the absence or sidelining of Guderian's close relationship with Hitler and his role in the Nazi regime – such as accepting large sums of bribes from Hitler to ensure loyalty. Guderian's attempt at elevating his accomplishments while downplaying the tactical advantages and successes of his opponents were also criticised by American military historian Russell A. Hart.

==== Correspondence with Liddell Hart ====
Guderian's involvement with Liddell Hart drew further criticisms which led to questioning the authenticity of Guderian's writings, at least in the 1952 English edition of Panzer Leader. British military historian Kenneth Macksey points to a deceptive yet critical paragraph printed on page 20 of the 1952 English edition where Guderian claimed to have owed many of the suggestions of Germany's armoured forces development to Captain Liddell Hart and his theories, in which Macksey posits as false and improbable. Macksey draws his conclusion from the fact that the paragraph was absent in the original German publication of Panzer Leader, and that Liddell Hart's works were also absent in the bibliography of Guderian's pre-war armoured warfare book (Achtung – Panzer!) whereas other military theorists like that of J. F. C. Fuller and Giffard Le Quesne Martel were featured prominently in it. This was further supported by Guderian's elder son, Heinz-Günther Guderian, who wrote: "As far as I know it was Fuller who made the most suggestions. Once before the war my father visited him. Fuller was almost certainly more competent as an active officer than Captain B.H. Liddell Hart… At any rate my father often spoke of him [Fuller] while I cannot remember other names being mentioned at that time [before 1939]… The greater emphasis upon Liddell Hart seems to have developed through contacts after the war."

A letter written by Liddell Hart to Guderian dated 6 April 1951 was eventually discovered among Guderian's papers. The letter read:

"Because of our special association, and the wish that I should write the foreword to your book, people might wonder why there is no separate reference to what my writings taught. You might care to insert a remark that I emphasised the use of armoured forces for long-range operations engaged against the opposing army’s communications, and also proposed a type of armoured division combining panzer and panzer infantry units – and that these points particularly impressed you. A suitable place for such a remark, apart from page 15 (trans page 22) would be on page 19 (trans page 31). I would appreciate it if you felt inclined to insert a sentence or two."

Guderian's willingness to cooperate with Liddell Hart was questioned by Macksey and Guderian's son since other German generals and their families (most prominent being Erich von Manstein and Erwin Rommel's surviving family) were approached by Liddell Hart with similar requests and had refused him. Macksey argues that it was in line with Guderian's character that he had permitted Liddell Hart's edited paragraph out of kindness and gratitude for the two's newfound friendship, and that Guderian believed the paragraph would ultimately not diminish his own wartime achievements. However, Macksey suggests that Guderian would have rejected and disapproved of Liddell Hart had he lived long enough to witness Liddell Hart's subsequent "blatant trading" of the paragraph to falsely present himself as a pioneer of armoured warfare before 1939.

This discovery led to historians debating on the authenticity of Guderian's recounts and his true inspiration for the formation of the German armoured force. When confronted about the letter in 1968, Liddell Hart did not deny the accusations, leading to scholars placing further scepticism on Guderian's memoirs and claiming the book was an attempt by both Guderian and Liddell Hart to rewrite history. Prominent supporters of the 'Guderian myth', which once included Kenneth Macksey, subsequently broke away from fully embracing Guderian's memoirs to adopting more critical approaches to reading Panzer Leader and understanding Guderian after the war. This shift in approach was acknowledged in the forewords of Macksey's revised editions of Guderian: Panzer General (originally published as Guderian: The Creator of Blitzkrieg in 1975), where Macksey acknowledges that John Mearsheimer's pivotal 1988 book (Liddell Hart and the Weight of History) had "brought about the virtual ruin of Liddell Hart's reputation as a historian and military philosopher" and ponders on "the extent to which that deception tended to diminish Guderian's reputation."

== Known editions ==
- Guderian, Heinz (1950) [1950]. Erinnerungen eines Soldaten (Original German ed.). Heidelberg: Kurt Vowinckel Verlag.
- Guderian, Heinz (1952). Panzer Leader. Translated by FitzGibbon, Constantine. London: Michael Joseph. OCLC 395600.
- Guderian, Heinz (2001) [1952]. Panzer Leader (Da Capo Press Reissue ed.). New York: Da Capo Press. ISBN 0-306-81101-4.
- Guderian, Heinz (1957). Panzer Leader (Abridged ed.). New York: Ballantine Books. OCLC 14019563.
- Guderian, Heinz (1952). Panzer Leader. Delhi, India: Army Publishers, Hindustan Offset Press. Cover Title misspelled "Panzar Leader".

== See also ==
- Panzer Battles
- Armored warfare
- German Rearmament
- Hans von Luck
