= Baranowo =

Baranowo may refer to the following places:

- Baranowo, Kuyavian-Pomeranian Voivodeship (north-central Poland)
- Baranowo, Masovian Voivodeship (east-central Poland)
- Baranowo, Podlaskie Voivodeship (north-east Poland)
- Baranowo, Gniezno County in Greater Poland Voivodeship (west-central Poland)
- Baranowo, Gmina Mosina in Greater Poland Voivodeship (west-central Poland)
- Baranowo, Gmina Tarnowo Podgórne in Greater Poland Voivodeship (west-central Poland)
- Baranowo, Pomeranian Voivodeship (north Poland)
- Baranowo, Mrągowo County in Warmian-Masurian Voivodeship (north Poland)
- Baranowo, Szczytno County in Warmian-Masurian Voivodeship (north Poland)
