= Guderian (surname) =

Guderian is a German surname. Other spellings are Guderjahn and Guderjan. It is present in Greater Poland and Mazovia in the 19th century. Notable people with the surname include:

- Heinz Guderian (1888–1954), German general and military theorist
- Heinz Günther Guderian (1914–2004), son of Heinz Wilhelm Guderian
- Ewa Guderian-Czaplińska (1962–2020), Polish theatre historian
- Isaak (singer) (Isaak Guderian, born 1996), German singer
