= Karczyn =

Karczyn may refer to the following places in Poland:

- Karczyn, Lower Silesian Voivodeship (south-west Poland)
- Karczyn, Kuyavian-Pomeranian Voivodeship (north-central Poland)
- Karczyn, Lubusz Voivodeship (west Poland)
