= Rozniaty =

Rozniaty may refer to the following places in Poland:

- Rożniaty, Subcarpathian Voivodeship (south-east Poland)
- Różniaty, Kuyavian-Pomeranian Voivodeship (north-central Poland)
