= Zwanowice =

Zwanowice may refer to:

- Zwanowice, Brzeg County, Opole Voivodeship (south-west Poland)
- Zwanowice, Nysa County, Opole Voivodeship (south-west Poland)
- Żwanowice, Kuyavian-Pomeranian Voivodeship (north-central Poland)
