= Janikowo (disambiguation) =

Janikowo is a town in Inowrocław County, Kuyavian-Pomeranian Voivodeship (north-central Poland).

Janikowo may also refer to the following places in Poland:

- Janikowo, Gmina Kruszwica in Kuyavian-Pomeranian Voivodeship
- Janikowo, Greater Poland Voivodeship (west-central Poland), partly within the city of Poznań
- Janikowo, Masovian Voivodeship (east-central Poland)
- Janikowo, Warmian-Masurian Voivodeship (north Poland)
