= Witowice, Kuyavian-Pomeranian Voivodeship =

Witowice
- Village
- Location within Poland
- Coordinates: 52°35′31″N 18°25′31″E
- Country: Poland
- Voivodeship: Kuyavian-Pomeranian
- County: Inowrocław
- Gmina: Kruszwica
- Population: 100
- Time zone: UTC+1 (CET)
  - Summer (DST): UTC+2 (CEST)
- Vehicle registration: CIN

Witowice [vitɔˈvit͡sɛ] is a village in the administrative district of Gmina Kruszwica, within Inowrocław County, Kuyavian-Pomeranian Voivodeship, in north-central Poland.

== History ==
During the German occupation of Poland (World War II), Witowice was one of the sites of executions of Poles, carried out by the Germans in 1939 as part of the Intelligenzaktion. A local teacher was among the victims of a massacre of Poles from the region, committed by the Germans on November 1, 1939, in the forest near Gniewkowo. In 1940, the occupiers expelled the entire population of the village, which was then placed in a transit camp in Łódź and eventually deported to the Lublin District of the General Government in the more eastern part of German-occupied Poland. Houses of expelled Poles were handed over to new German colonists as part of the Lebensraum policy.
