= Janocin =

- Village
- Location within Poland
- Coordinates: 52°37′36″N 18°24′37″E
- Country: Poland
- Voivodeship: Kuyavian-Pomeranian
- County: Inowrocław
- Gmina: Kruszwica

Janocin [jaˈnɔt͡ɕin] is a village in the administrative district of Gmina Kruszwica, within Inowrocław County, Kuyavian-Pomeranian Voivodeship, in north-central Poland.
