= Gustawowo =

- Village
- Location within Poland
- Coordinates: 52°39′55″N 18°17′17″E
- Country: Poland
- Voivodeship: Kuyavian-Pomeranian
- County: Inowrocław
- Gmina: Kruszwica

Gustawowo [ɡustaˈvɔvɔ] is a village in the administrative district of Gmina Kruszwica, within Inowrocław County, Kuyavian-Pomeranian Voivodeship, in north-central Poland.
