= Zaborowo, Inowrocław County =

Zaborowo
- Village
- Location within Poland
- Coordinates: 52°39′N 18°27′E
- Country: Poland
- Voivodeship: Kuyavian-Pomeranian
- County: Inowrocław
- Gmina: Kruszwica

Zaborowo ([zabɔˈrɔvɔ]; German: Zaborowo, 1939–45 Hinterwalden) is a village in the administrative district of Gmina Kruszwica, within Inowrocław County, Kuyavian-Pomeranian Voivodeship, in north-central Poland.
