= Kraszyce =

- Village
- Location within Poland
- Coordinates: 52°39′17″N 18°15′10″E
- Country: Poland
- Voivodeship: Kuyavian-Pomeranian
- County: Inowrocław
- Gmina: Kruszwica

Kraszyce [kraˈʂɨt͡sɛ] is a village in the administrative district of Gmina Kruszwica, within Inowrocław County, Kuyavian-Pomeranian Voivodeship, in north-central Poland.
