= Gmina Kruszwica =

Gmina Kruszwica Kruszwica Commune
- Gmina
- Flag Coat of arms
- Interactive map of Gmina Kruszwica
- Coordinates (Kruszwica): 52°40′38″N 18°19′45″E
- Country: Poland
- Voivodeship: Kuyavian-Pomeranian
- County: Inowrocław
- Seat: Kruszwica

Area
  - Total: 262.19 km^{2} (101.23 sq mi)

Population (2006)
  - Total: 19,971
  - Density: 76.170/km^{2} (197.28/sq mi)
  - Urban: 9,373
  - Rural: 10,598
- Website: http://www.kruszwica.um.gov.pl/

Gmina Kruszwica is an urban-rural gmina (administrative district) in Inowrocław County, Kuyavian-Pomeranian Voivodeship, in north-central Poland. Its seat is the town of Kruszwica, which lies approximately 14 kilometres (9 mi) south of Inowrocław and 44 km (27 mi) south-west of Toruń.

The gmina covers an area of 262.19 square kilometres (101.2 sq mi), and as of 2006 its total population is 19,971 (out of which the population of Kruszwica amounts to 9,373, and the population of the rural part of the gmina is 10,598).

The gmina contains part of the protected area called Gopło Landscape Park.

== Villages ==
Apart from the town of Kruszwica, Gmina Kruszwica contains the villages and settlements of Arturowo, Baranowo, Bródzki, Brześć, Cykowo, Giżewo, Głębokie, Gustawowo, Janikowo, Janocin, Karczyn, Kraszyce, Łagiewniki, Maszenice, Mietlica, Morgi, Orpikowo, Ostrówek, Przedbojewice, Różniaty, Rzepiszyn, Skotniki, Słabęcin, Tarnówko, Witowice, Zaborowo, Żerniki and Żwanowice.

== Neighbouring gminas ==
Gmina Kruszwica is bordered by the gminas of Dąbrowa Biskupia, Dobre, Inowrocław, Jeziora Wielkie, Piotrków Kujawski, Radziejów, Skulsk and Strzelno.
