= Bródzki =

- Village
- Location within Poland
- Coordinates: 52°40′11″N 18°22′40″E
- Country: Poland
- Voivodeship: Kuyavian-Pomeranian
- County: Inowrocław
- Gmina: Kruszwica

Bródzki [ˈbrut͡ski] is a village in the administrative district of Gmina Kruszwica, within Inowrocław County, Kuyavian-Pomeranian Voivodeship, in north-central Poland.
