= Słabęcin =

- Village
- Location within Poland
- Coordinates: 52°37′10″N 18°17′35″E
- Country: Poland
- Voivodeship: Kuyavian-Pomeranian
- County: Inowrocław
- Gmina: Kruszwica

Słabęcin [swaˈbɛnt͡ɕin] is a village in the administrative district of Gmina Kruszwica, within Inowrocław County, Kuyavian-Pomeranian Voivodeship, in north-central Poland.
