= Łagiewniki, Inowrocław County =

Łagiewniki
- District of Kruszwica
- Location within Poland
- Coordinates: 52°39′57″N 18°18′55″E
- Country: Poland
- Voivodeship: Kuyavian-Pomeranian
- County: Inowrocław
- Gmina: Kruszwica
- Town: Kruszwica
- Time zone: UTC+1 (CET)
  - Summer (DST): UTC+2 (CEST)
- Vehicle registration: CIN

Łagiewniki [waɡʲɛvˈniki] (German: Büttenhof) is a district of Kruszwica, Kuyavian-Pomeranian Voivodeship, Poland, located in the southwestern part of the town.

== History ==
During the German occupation of Poland (World War II), Łagiewniki was one of the sites of executions of Poles, carried out by the Germans in 1939 as part of the Intelligenzaktion.
