= Brześć, Kuyavian-Pomeranian Voivodeship =

Brześć
- Village
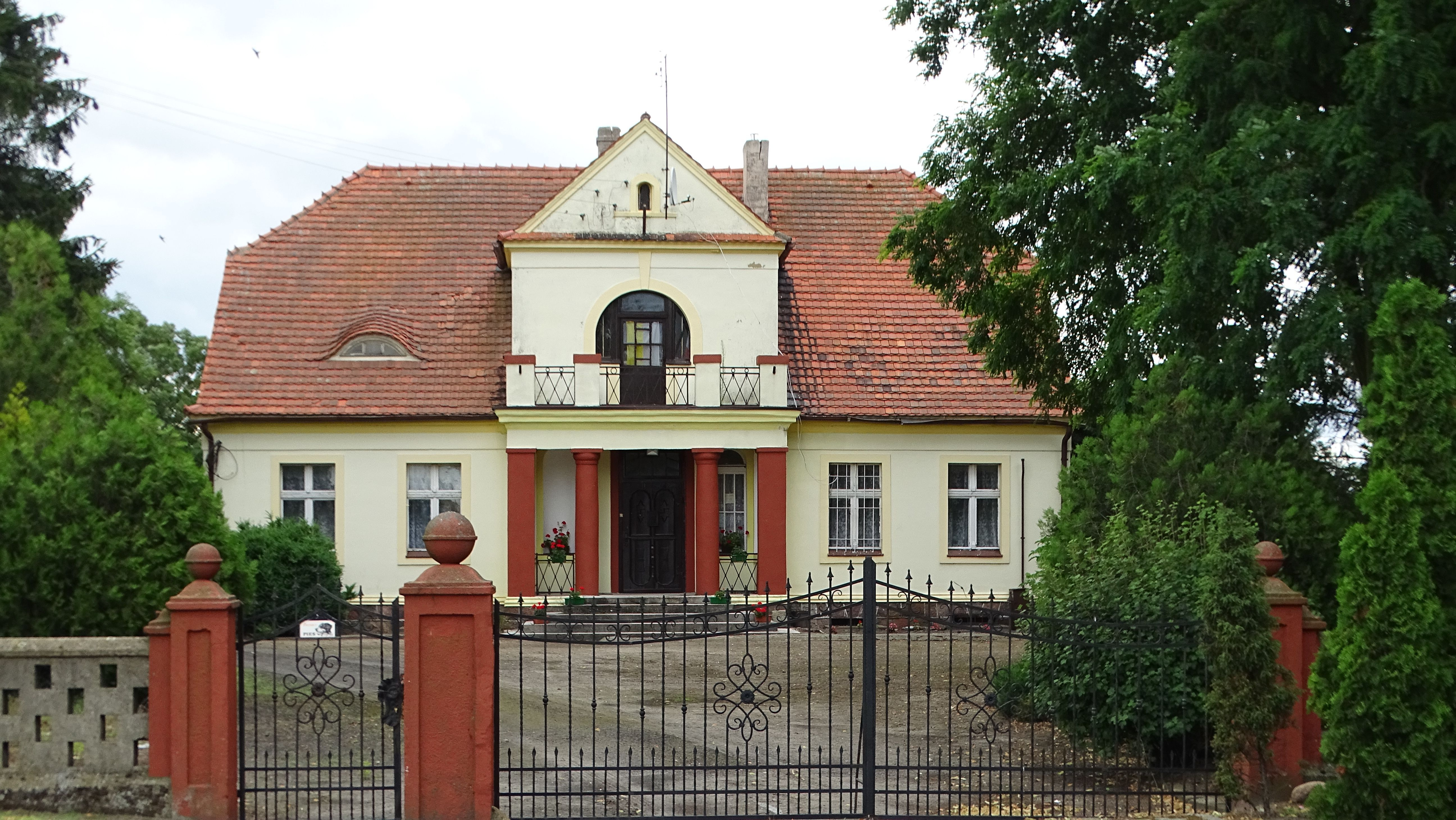

- Location within Poland
- Coordinates: 52°33′37″N 18°25′17″E
- Country: Poland
- Voivodeship: Kuyavian-Pomeranian
- County: Inowrocław
- Gmina: Kruszwica
- Time zone: UTC+1 (CET)
  - Summer (DST): UTC+2 (CEST)
- Vehicle registration: CIN

Brześć [bʐɛɕt͡ɕ] is a village in the administrative district of Gmina Kruszwica, within Inowrocław County, Kuyavian-Pomeranian Voivodeship, in central Poland.
