= Giżewo =

- Village
- Location within Poland
- Coordinates: 52°38′22″N 18°18′43″E
- Country: Poland
- Voivodeship: Kuyavian-Pomeranian
- County: Inowrocław
- Gmina: Kruszwica

Giżewo [ɡiˈʐɛvɔ] is a village in the administrative district of Gmina Kruszwica, within Inowrocław County, Kuyavian-Pomeranian Voivodeship, in north-central Poland.

== History ==
Between 1975 and 1998, the town administratively belonged to Bydgoszcz Voivodeship.

Around 1560, the village belonged to Słonecka and Krzysztof Markowski, and in more recent times to the Sokólski family. In 1816 the owner of Giżewo was Leon Górski.
