= Orpikowo =

- Village
- Location within Poland
- Coordinates: 52°35′8″N 18°23′32″E
- Country: Poland
- Voivodeship: Kuyavian-Pomeranian
- County: Inowrocław
- Gmina: Kruszwica

Orpikowo [ɔrpiˈkɔvɔ] is a village in the administrative district of Gmina Kruszwica, within Inowrocław County, Kuyavian-Pomeranian Voivodeship, in north-central Poland.
