= Guderian-Plan =

The Guderian Plan is a plan developed in the autumn of 1944 for the restoration and expansion of the eastern fortifications of the German Reich. The plan was named after its initiator General Heinz Guderian.

General Heinz Guderian, in his capacity as Chief of the General Staff of the Army, had a plan drawn up in the fall of 1944 for the possible expansion of the German East fortifications. This happened, as Soviet troops had advanced in the course of Operation Bagration in the summer of 1944 to the Vistula and to the frontier in East Prussia. Guderian formulated the plan together with the general of the Pioneers, Alfred Jacob. It included the rearmament of the Festungsfront Oder-Warthe-Bogen (East Wall) the construction of defensive lines along the Oder, Vistula and nets, the construction of the Pomeranian wall and the Samland fortifications including the fortification of the city of Königsberg. In addition, fortifications in Glogau, Breslau, Posen and Danzig as well as on the Hel Peninsula and the Öxhöfter Kämpe near Gotenhafen were set up or repaired. For the execution of these buildings, the staff of the General Staff was re-established and placed under the command of Lieutenant-Colonel Thilo. The expansion of the fortresses and ramparts was carried out by the mass deployment of volunteers and forced civilians and the Hitler Youth.

To manning these fortresses, 100 Fortress Infantry battalions and 100 fortress batteries were set up. In the course of the Ardennes offensive, however, 80% of these troops were transferred to the Western Front on Hitler's orders, so that during the beginning of the Soviet offensive in January 1945, the fortresses were manned with only about 20% of the planned personnel. For the reinforcement of the fortresses, thousands of functional booty guns were still stored in German army-producing offices. However, this armament was also deducted on the orders of Colonel General Alfred Jodl to the Western Front, so that only a few guns larger caliber could be installed in the eastern fortifications. In large numbers, only anti-aircraft guns were installed in the improvised positions. The stocking of the fortresses was set up for a period of three months.

Looking back on the effects of these fortresses, it can be seen that these have slowed down the advance of the Red Army, although they could not stop it. The fortresses of the Oder-Warthebogens fell very fast, while other fortresses like Königsberg, Danzig, Glogau or Breslau (until the capitulation in May 1945) lasted longer. The strongholds of Glogau (siege of Glogau) and Breslau (siege of Breslau) withstood the attacks of the Red Army. It remains to be noted that the fortifications made possible by the slowing of the Soviet advance many refugees, especially from Silesia, Pomerania, West and East Prussia. This includes the keeping open of land connections and seaports (Operation Hannibal) for a certain period of time.

== Literature ==
- Karl J. Walde: Guderian. Ullstein 1979, Frankfurt am Main/ Berlin/ Wien, ISBN 3-548-33004-5 (German)
- Dermot Bradley: Generaloberst Heinz Guderian und die Entstehungsgeschichte des modernen Blitzkrieges. Biblio, Osnabrück 1986, ISBN 3-7648-1486-1 (German)
- Gerd F. Heuer: Die Generalobersten des Heeres. Inhaber höchster deutscher Kommandostellen. Moewig, Rastatt 1988, ISBN 3-8118-1049-9, p. 71–78 (German)
- Florian K. Rothbrust: Guderian’s XIXth Panzer Corps and the Battle of France. Breakthrough in the Ardennes, May 1940. Praeger, New York NY 1990, ISBN 0-275-93473-X
- Kenneth Macksey: Guderian der Panzergeneral. Biography. Kaiser, Klagenfurt 1994, ISBN 3-7042-3037-5 (German)
- Heinz Guderian: Erinnerungen eines Soldaten. 14. edition. Motorbuch Verlag, Stuttgart 1995, p. 171 ff (German)
