= Bribery of senior Wehrmacht officers =

Bribery of Wehrmacht officers in exchange for loyalty towards National Socialism

From 1933 to the end of the Second World War, high-ranking officers of the Armed Forces of Nazi Germany accepted vast bribes in the form of cash, estates, and tax exemptions in exchange for their loyalty to Nazism. Unlike bribery at lower ranks in the Wehrmacht, which was also widespread, these payments were regularised, technically legal, and made with the full knowledge and consent of the leading Nazi figures.

== Background ==
Historically, German and other European rulers commonly awarded titles, estates, and monetary rewards to diplomats and high-ranking officers. This was generally done to form a bond between the ruler and important subjects. The historical practice, however, differed from the one applied by Adolf Hitler. While in the Kingdom of Prussia, awards had usually been given publicly after successful campaigns or wars, Hitler dispensed the rewards to his elites in secret during the war.

Diego Gambetta argues that Hitler's practice can be considered selective incentives rather than bribery, since bribery must involve three agents (the truster, the fiduciary, and the corrupter) rather than two. In this case, Hitler's generals (the fiduciary) were paid to do what they were supposed to do for him (the truster, and not the corrupter) in any case. However, by accepting the gifts, the generals sacrificed the independence and the political influence they had already been losing as the result of the systematic consolidation of Hitler's role as the sole "genius strategist", and would remain chained to Hitler's decisions even when their soldiers and the common people suffered during the last phase of the war. Thus, historians consider the practice, although "not technically illegal" (since the gifts were granted by Hitler himself), "smacking of corruption" and "having an aura of deliberate corruption from above."

Some historians compare the practice with that used by Napoleon, his military class, and his officials.

== Mechanism ==
To ensure the absolute loyalty of Wehrmacht officers and to console them over the loss of their "state within the state", Hitler had created what American historian Gerhard Weinberg called "a vast secret program of bribery involving practically all at the highest levels of command". Hitler routinely presented his leading commanders with "gifts" of free estates, cars, checks made out for large sums of cash, and lifetime exemptions from paying taxes. A typical example was a check made out for a half million Reichsmarks, presented to Field Marshal Günther von Kluge in October 1942, together with the promise that he could bill the German treasury for any and all "improvements" that he might wish to make to his estate.

Such was the success of Hitler's bribery system that by 1942, many officers had come to expect the bestowing of "gifts" from Hitler and were unwilling to bite the hand that fed them so generously. When Field Marshal Fedor von Bock was sacked by Hitler in December 1941, his first reaction was to contact Hitler's aide Rudolf Schmundt to ask if his sacking meant that he was no longer to receive bribes from the Konto 5 ("bank account 5") slush fund.

=== Konto 5 special fund ===
The Konto 5 slush fund, run by the chief of the Reich Chancellery Hans Lammers and distributed by Hitler as personal presents, started with a budget of about 150,000 Reichsmarks in 1933 and had grown to about 40 million Reichsmarks by 1945. Initially the funds came through his office as Reichskanzler and, after 1934, as Reichspräsident. The mandatory pre-1933 checks through parliament and the countersigning of the payments by the German finance minister were abolished by the Nazis. The money spent was at Hitler's discretion and required no other approval.

Payments from Konto 5, known officially as Aufwandsentschädigungen ("compensation for expenses"), had been made to Cabinet ministers and senior civil servants since April 1936. As part of the reorganisation of the military command structure following the Blomberg–Fritsch affair in early 1938, it was declared that the service chiefs, namely Oberkommando der Wehrmacht (OKW) Chief Wilhelm Keitel, Army commander Walther von Brauchitsch, Luftwaffe commander Hermann Göring, and Kriegsmarine commander Erich Raeder were to have the same status as Cabinet ministers and so all started to receive publicly the same pay as a Cabinet member and privately payments from Konto 5.

The basis of the corruption system was monthly, tax-free payments of 4,000 Reichsmarks deposited in the bank accounts of field marshals and grand admirals and 2000 Reichsmarks for all other senior officers. On top of the money from Konto 5, officers received cheques, usually made out for the sum of 250,000 Reichsmarks, as birthday presents; they were exempt from income tax but not on interest earned from the money.

That money came in addition to the official salary of 26,000 Reichsmarks a year for field marshals and grand admirals and 24,000 Reichsmarks a year for colonel generals and general admirals, as well as tax-exempt payments of 400 and 300 Reichsmarks a month, respectively, to help deal with the rising wartime living costs. In addition, senior officers were given a lifetime exemption from paying income tax, which was, in effect, a huge pay raise because of Germany's high income tax rates (by 1939, there was a 65% tax rate for income over 2,400 Reichsmarks), and they were also provided with spending allowances for food, medical care, clothing, and housing. In contrast, infantrymen who had the dangerous task of clearing landmines were given only 1 Reichsmark a day as a danger pay supplement. (1 Reichsmark was worth around $0.40 in 1940, or about $13 in 2015 based on gold prices).

=== Nature of payments ===
Before any officer began to receive money, they met with Lammers, who informed them that future payments would depend on how much loyalty they were willing to show Hitler. They were advised that what he gave with one hand could just as easily be taken away with the other. The illicit nature of the payments was emphasised by Lammers's warning to them not to speak about the payments to anyone and to keep as few written records as possible.

The money from Konto 5 was deposited for the officer's lifetime and did not stop when he retired. In the last months of the war, Erich von Manstein, Wilhelm List, Georg von Küchler, and Maximilian von Weichs kept on changing the bank accounts into which Lammers had to deposit the money from Konto 5 to avoid the Allied advance. Much correspondence went back and forth between the officers and Lammers, as they kept writing anxiously to make certain that he was depositing their monthly bribes into the right accounts.

== Notable recipients ==
=== August von Mackensen ===
The first officer to be bribed for loyalty was the old World War I hero Field Marshal August von Mackensen, who welcomed the Nazi regime but criticised the murder of General Kurt von Schleicher in a speech before the General Staff Association in February 1935. To silence him, Hitler gave Mackensen a free estate of 1,250 hectares later that same year. This endowment was public and not secret. After this, according to Norman Goda, Mackensen remained loyal to the regime, although not enough from Hitler's point-of-view. In February 1940, Mackensen mentioned to Walther von Brauchitsch his view that the army had disgraced itself by committing massacres during the recent campaign in Poland. In 1942, Hitler was angered when reported that Mackensen helped to spread a defeatist letter among the generals (Goda considers this to be a falsified rumour; according to Joseph Goebbels' report, while the letter itself was a forgery, Mackensen did play a major part in disseminating it). Hitler and Goebbels considered this disloyalty, although Mackensen was not punished by losing his estate.

=== Walther von Brauchitsch ===
In 1938, Colonel General Walther von Brauchitsch decided to divorce his wife to marry a much younger woman who happened to be a "two hundred per cent rabid Nazi". The divorce court had a less kind view of Brauchitsch's decision to end his marriage than did his political master, and awarded the first Frau von Brauchitsch a substantial settlement. Hitler earned Brauchitsch's eternal gratitude by agreeing to use German tax-payers' money to pay his entire divorce settlement, said to have been between 80,000 and 250,000 Reichsmarks. Brauchitsch had been promoted to army commander to replace Werner von Fritsch, who had resigned following false allegations of homosexuality, and was a compromise candidate as the army had refused to accept Hitler's first choice of Walter von Reichenau as Fritsch's successor.

=== Heinz Guderian ===
As well as money, in early 1943, General Heinz Guderian was informed that if he wanted an estate in Poland, to tell Hitler whose land he wanted, and he would get it. This resulted in him making several visits to Poland to find the right estate to seize. This caused some problems with the SS, which had designs on some of the estates that Guderian desired before a deal was worked out about which estate he could take. His bribe of a 937 hectares estate, confiscated from its Polish owner, was tax-free for his entire life-time. Goda wrote that after Guderian received his Polish estate, the doubts he had been expressing since late 1941 about Hitler's military leadership suddenly ceased, and he became one of Hitler's most ardent military supporters, or, as Joseph Goebbels described him in his diary, "a glowing and unqualified follower of the Führer".

Before receiving his "gift" of a Polish estate, Guderian, as Inspector General for the Panzers, had been opposed to the plans for Unternehmen Zitadelle, which was to lead to the Battle of Kursk, one of Germany's worst defeats of the war; after receiving the estate, Guderian did a 180° turn about as to the wisdom of the operation. Instead of criticising Zitadelle openly, Guderian approached Goebbels to ask him if he could talk Hitler out of it, behaviour that Goda described as very atypical. Guderian was well known for his brash, blunt, outspoken style, for his rudeness to those he disliked, (in a notorious incident later in 1943, Guderian refused to shake hands with Field Marshal Kluge because as he told him to his face he was not worthy of shaking hands), and for using vulgar, profanity-ridden language to describe a plan if he believed it to be a bad one.

Guderian had foreknowledge of the 20 July plot of 1944 and did not report it to Hitler, but he did not commit himself to it either. On 20 July, Guderian withdrew to his Deipenhof estate and could not be contacted by the resistance. According to Goda, when it became clear that Hitler was still alive, Guderian ordered Panzer units in Berlin to stay loyal to the regime, and then sat on the Court of Honour that had the responsibility of expelling officers involved in it so that they could be tried before the Volksgerichtshof, a duty that he performed with zeal. It was only after January 1945, when Guderian's estate fell behind Soviet lines, that he began to disagree openly once more with Hitler. These disagreements were so intense that Hitler fired Guderian as Chief of the General Staff in March 1945.

Goda comments that much of the fury that Guderian expressed in his 1950 memoir Erinnerungen eines Soldaten about what he regarded as unjust border changes after the war in Poland's favour, seemed to be related to his intensely held private view that the Poles had no right to take away the Polish estate that Hitler had given to him.

=== Wilhelm Ritter von Leeb ===
In 1943, retired Field Marshal Wilhelm Ritter von Leeb managed to have the German state buy him an entire district of prime forest land in Bavaria, valued at 638,000 Reichsmarks, on which to build his estate. In late June-early July 1941 Leeb, as the commander of Army Group North, had witnessed first-hand the massacres committed by the Einsatzgruppen, Lithuanian auxiliaries, and the men of the 16th Army, outside Kaunas. As a Roman Catholic, Leeb was described as being "moderately disturbed" after seeing the killing fields, and sent in mildly critical reports about the massacres. Leeb approved of the killing of Lithuanian Jewish men, claiming that this was justified by the crimes that they were supposed to have committed during the Soviet occupation of Lithuania; but the killing of women and children might have been taking things too far. In response, Hitler's aide General Rudolf Schmundt told Leeb that he was completely out of line for criticising the massacres at Kaunas, and should co-operate fully with the SS in "special tasks" in future.

Schmundt asked if Leeb really appreciated his monthly payments from Konto 5, and reminded him that his birthday was coming up in September; the Führer was planning to give him a 250,000 Reichsmark cheque as a present to reward his loyalty. Leeb never said a word in protest of the "Final Solution" again, and duly received the cheque in September 1941. In September 1941, Franz Walter Stahlecker, the commander of Einsatzgruppe A, in a report to Berlin, had nothing but praise for Leeb's Army Group North, which he reported had been exemplary in co-operating with his men in murdering Jews in the Baltic states. Goda uses Leeb as an all-too typical example of a Wehrmacht officer whose greed overwhelmed any sort of moral revulsion that they might have felt about the Holocaust.

=== Other officers ===
In general, officers who were in some way critical of Hitler's military, if not necessarily political leadership, such as Leeb, Raeder, and Field Marshal Gerd von Rundstedt received (and accepted) larger bribes than officers who were well known to be convinced National Socialists such as Field Marshal Walter Model, Grand Admiral Karl Dönitz and Field Marshal Ferdinand Schörner. The success of Hitler's bribery system backfired in that some officers, such as Raeder, who had proven himself especially greedy, came to be regarded by Hitler as a serious annoyance because of his endless demands for more money, and more free land for his estates. Raeder's demand in 1942 that, on top of his life-time exemption from paying income taxes, Hitler also cancel taxes on the interest he earned from his 4,000 Reichsmarks a month payment from Konto 5, was viewed as outrageous. In 1944, Field Marshal Wolfram von Richthofen wrote to the OKW to argue that since he was stationed in Italy, at least 1,000 Reichsmarks of the 4,000 Reichsmarks deposited in his bank account every month should be in lire to compensate for the effects of rampant inflation in Italy. This demand was regarded as unreasonable even by Field Marshal Keitel who normally did not reject providing financial rewards for service to the Führer.

According to Goda, payments from Konto 5 to the bank account of Field Marshal Friedrich Paulus stopped in August 1943, not because he had lost the Battle of Stalingrad six months earlier but because he had gone on Soviet radio to blame Hitler for the defeat. Goda notes that the 1944 list of recipients (of the Generaloberst ranks and above) of the monthly allowance includes Field Marshal Erwin von Witzleben and others who were associated with the July 20 plot, but these names are crossed off. According to Goda, after the failure of the 20 July plot in 1944, the families of Erwin Rommel, Franz Halder, Friedrich Fromm, and Günther von Kluge were punished by being cut off from the monthly payments from Konto 5. In the case of Witzleben, his family was ordered to repay some of the bribe money that he had received from Konto 5, since the money was given as a reward for loyalty to the Führer as Witzleben was evidently not loyal.

Also based on statistics collected from Bundesarchiv Berlin, R 43 II, the account of Ueberschär and Vogel includes Halder among the 1944 recipients, but not Rommel, Kluge, Fromm, and Witzleben (Ueberschär and Vogel do not provide statistics regarding the recipients of previous years). Although they note that Rommel was among the officers invited by Lammers to join the system in 1942, the two historians opine that whether he did successfully object to the donations cannot be known using current archival sources. According to Peter Lieb, the current state of research does not indicate Rommel as a recipient of Hitler's donations. According to Ueberschär and Vogel, Kurt Zeitzler is also said in the literature to have refused a donation, but this, too, cannot be found in archival sources. Zeitzler was among the 1944 recipients of the monthly allowance.

== Post-war ==
The subject of the payments proved to be an embarrassing one for its recipients. Under oath at the Nuremberg trials, Walther von Brauchitsch denied that he took any bribes, perjuring himself. Brauchitsch's bank records showed that he had been receiving 4,000 Reichsmarks per month payments from Konto 5 from 1938 until the end of the war. At his trial in 1948, General Franz Halder perjured himself when he denied that he had taken bribes, and then had to maintain a stern silence when U.S. prosecutor James M. McHaney produced bank records showing otherwise. Erhard Milch admitted accepting money when under oath in 1947, but claimed that this was only compensation for the salary that he had been making as an executive at Lufthansa, a claim that Goda called "ridiculous". Weinberg commented that "the bribery system understandably does not figure prominently in the endless memoir literature of the recipients and has attracted little scholarly attention".

== Known participants ==
- Walther von Brauchitsch
- Heinz Guderian
- Franz Halder
- Albert Kesselring
- Ewald von Kleist
- Günther von Kluge
- Georg von Küchler
- Wilhelm Ritter von Leeb
- Wilhelm List
- Erich von Manstein
- Erhard Milch
- Erich Raeder
- Wolfram von Richthofen
- Gerd von Rundstedt
- Hugo Sperrle
- Maximilian von Weichs
