= Tarnówko, Kuyavian-Pomeranian Voivodeship =

Tarnówko
- Village
- Location within Poland
- Coordinates: 52°36′56″N 18°23′50″E
- Country: Poland
- Voivodeship: Kuyavian-Pomeranian
- County: Inowrocław
- Gmina: Kruszwica

Tarnówko [tarˈnufkɔ] is a village in the administrative district of Gmina Kruszwica, within Inowrocław County, Kuyavian-Pomeranian Voivodeship, in north-central Poland.
