= Skotniki, Kuyavian-Pomeranian Voivodeship =

Skotniki
- Village
- Location within Poland
- Coordinates: 52°41′30″N 18°28′16″E
- Country: Poland
- Voivodeship: Kuyavian-Pomeranian
- County: Inowrocław
- Gmina: Kruszwica
- Time zone: UTC+1 (CET)
  - Summer (DST): UTC+2 (CEST)
- Vehicle registration: CIN

Skotniki [skɔtˈniki] is a village in the administrative district of Gmina Kruszwica, within Inowrocław County, Kuyavian-Pomeranian Voivodeship, in north-central Poland. It is located in the historic region of Kuyavia.

Skotniki was a royal village of the Kingdom of Poland, administratively located in the Radziejów County in the Brześć Kujawski Voivodeship in the Greater Poland Province.
