= Heinz Guderian =

German Wehrmacht Heer general (1888–1954)

- Guderian in 1941

Chief of the General Staff of the German Army High Command
- In office 21 July 1944 – 28 March 1945
- Leader: Adolf Hitler
- Preceded by: Adolf Heusinger
- Succeeded by: Hans Krebs

Personal details
- Born: Heinz Wilhelm Guderian; 17 June 1888 Kulm, Kingdom of Prussia, German Empire
- Died: 14 May 1954 (aged 65) Schwangau, West Germany
- Spouse: Margarete Goerne (m. 1913)
- Children: Heinz Günther; Kurt
- Awards: Knight's Cross of the Iron Cross with Oak Leaves
- Nicknames: Schneller Heinz (lit. 'Heinz the Speedy'); Der Panzergeneral (lit. 'The Tank General'); Heinz the Sledgehammer; Heinz the Stormy Weather

Military service
- Allegiance: German Empire; Weimar Republic; Nazi Germany
- Branch: Imperial German Army; Reichswehr; German Army
- Years of service: 1907–1945
- Rank: Generaloberst
- Commands: 2nd Panzer Division; XVI Army Corps; XIX Army Corps; 2nd Panzer Army
- Battles/wars: World War I; Battle of Verdun; Russian Civil War; Estonian War of Independence; World War II; Invasion of Poland; Battle of France; Battle of Sedan; Operation Barbarossa; Battle of Białystok–Minsk; Battle of Smolensk; Battle of Kiev; Battle of Moscow; Battle of Tula

Heinz Wilhelm Guderian (German: [haɪnts ˈvɪlhɛlm ɡuˈdeːʁi.an]; 17 June 1888 – 14 May 1954) was a German army general and military theorist. A pioneer and advocate of what would come to be called the "blitzkrieg" approach, he played a central role in the development of the panzer division concept and tank warfare more broadly.

In 1936, after serving in the military since leaving school, including in World War I, he was promoted to Heer Generalmajor (Major General) and became the Inspector of Motorized Troops. At the beginning of World War II, Guderian led an armoured corps in the Invasion of Poland with the rank of General der Panzertruppe. During the Invasion of France, he commanded the armoured units that attacked through the Ardennes forest and overwhelmed the Allied defenses at the Battle of Sedan. He led the 2nd Panzer Army with the rank of Generaloberst (Colonel General) during Operation Barbarossa, the invasion of the Soviet Union. The campaign ended in failure after the German offensive Operation Typhoon failed to capture Moscow, and after a disagreement with Hitler, Guderian was dismissed.

In early 1943, Adolf Hitler appointed Guderian to the newly created position of Inspector General of Armoured Troops. In this role, he had broad responsibility to rebuild and train new panzer forces but saw limited success due to Germany's worsening war economy. Guderian was appointed Acting Chief of the General Staff of the Army High Command, immediately following the 20 July Plot to assassinate Hitler. Guderian was appointed as a member of the "Court of Honour" by Hitler, which in the aftermath of the plot was used to dismiss people from the military so they could be tried in the "People's Court" and executed. He was Hitler's personal advisor on the Eastern Front and became closely associated with the Nazis. Guderian's troops carried out the criminal Commissar Order during Barbarossa, and he was implicated in the commission of reprisals after the Warsaw Uprising of 1944.

Guderian surrendered to US forces on 10 May 1945 and was interned until 1948. He was released without being charged and retired to write his memoirs. Entitled "Memoirs of a Soldier", the autobiography was published in 1950 and became a bestseller. Guderian's writings received backlash in the decades since their release, with historians finding the original works to contain post-war myths, including that of the "clean Wehrmacht". Guderian portrayed himself as the sole originator of the panzer force and refused the stipulation that units under his command committed crimes of war. These criticisms were partially addressed in his 1952 re-release edition of the book, newly entitled Panzer Leader, which mended some historic inaccuracies and introduced a foreword from B. H. Liddell Hart. Guderian died in 1954 and was buried in Goslar.

== Early life and World War I ==
Guderian was born in Kulm, West Prussia (since 1920 Poland), on 17 June 1888, the son of Friedrich and Clara (née Kirchhoff). His father and grandfathers were Prussian officers and he grew up in garrison towns surrounded by the military. In 1903, he left home and enrolled at a military cadet school. He was a capable student, although he performed poorly in his final exam. He entered the army as an officer cadet on 28 February 1907 with the 10th Hanoverian Light Infantry Battalion (Hannoversche Jäger-Bataillon Nr. 10), under his father's command. He became a second lieutenant on 27 January 1908, receiving his patent backdated to 22 June 1906. On 1 October 1913 he married Margarete Goerne, with whom he had two sons: Heinz Günther (1914–2004) and Kurt (1918–1984).

At the outbreak of World War I, Guderian served as a communications officer and the commander of a radio station. In November, 1914 he was promoted to first lieutenant. Between May, 1915 and January, 1916 Guderian was in charge of signals intelligence for the 4th Army. He fought at the Battle of Verdun during this period and was promoted to captain on 15 November 1915. He was then sent to the 4th Infantry Division before becoming commander of the Second Battalion of Infantry Regiment 14. On 28 February 1918, Guderian was appointed to the General Staff Corps. Guderian finished the war as an operations officer in occupied Italy. Guderian disagreed with Germany signing the armistice in 1918, believing that they should have continued the fight.

== Interwar period ==
Guderian was strongly opposed to the Treaty of Versailles. He particularly objected to the fact that much of West Prussia was ceded to the Second Polish Republic, including Kulm. This was due to a strong belief that Kulm would be negatively affected by Polish control, as Guderian held anti-Polish prejudices; he wrote to Margarete about the ceding of West Prussia, and described Poles as "poor, dirty, incompetent, stupid and vulgar, depraved and treacherous."

Early in 1919, Guderian was selected as one of the four thousand officers allowed by the Versailles Treaty in the reduced-size German army, the Reichswehr. He was assigned to serve on the staff of the central command of the Eastern Frontier Guard Service which was intended to control and coordinate the independent freikorps units in the defense of Germany's eastern frontiers against Polish (who were not attacking Germany) and Soviet forces engaged in the Russian Civil War in conjunction with the Estonian War of Independence. In June, 1919 Guderian joined the Iron Brigade (later known as the Iron Division) as its second General Staff officer.

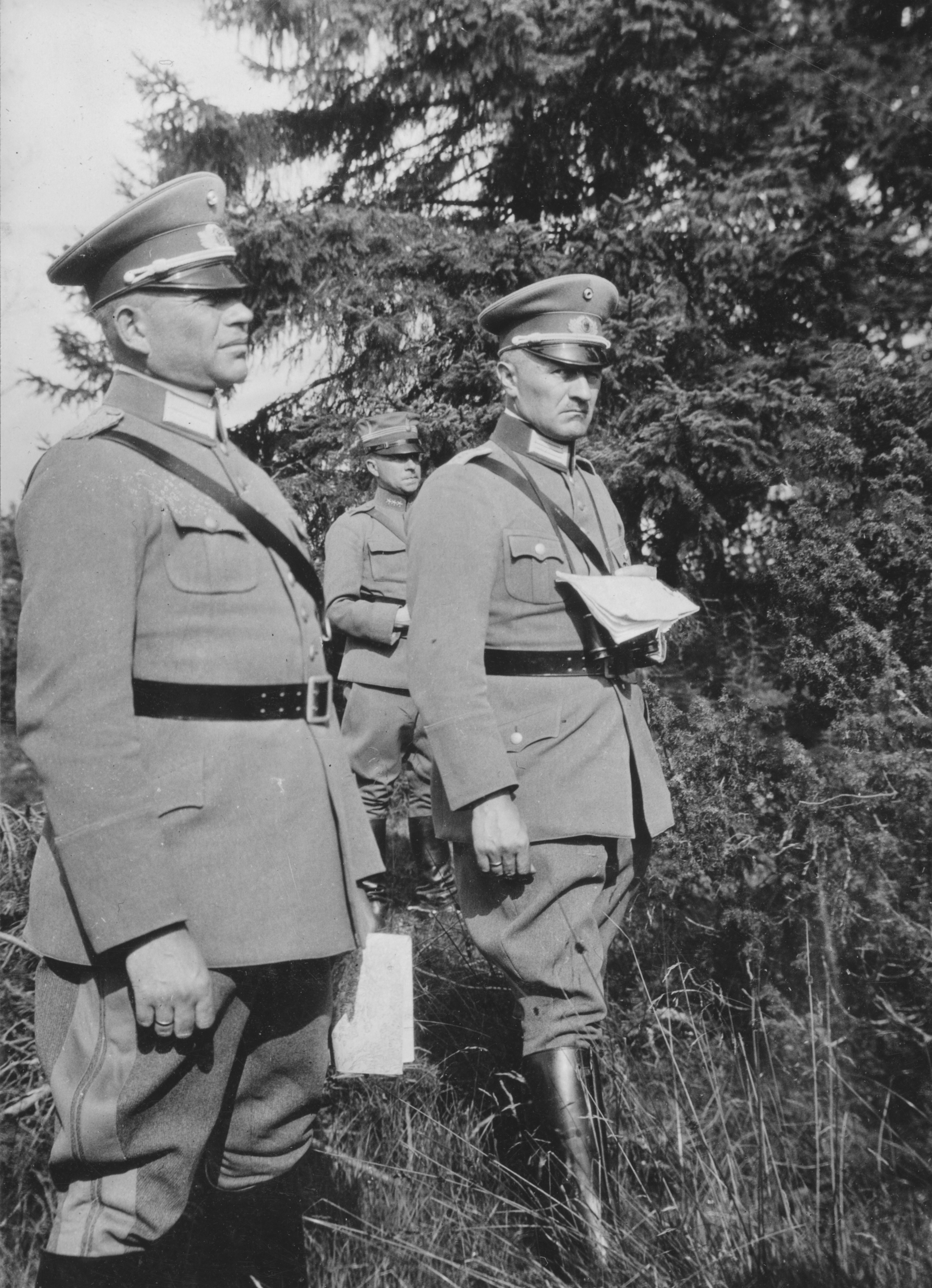
Guderian (left) in Sweden, 1929

In the 1920s, Guderian was introduced to armored warfare tactics by Ernst Volckheim, a World War I tank commander and a prolific writer on the subject. He studied the leading European literature on armored warfare and, between 1922 and 1928, wrote five papers for Military Weekly, an armed forces journal. While the topics covered were mundane, Guderian related them to why Germany had lost World War I, a controversial subject at the time, and thus raised his profile in the military. There were some trial maneuvers conducted in the Soviet Union and Guderian academically evaluated the results. Britain was experimenting with armoured units under General Percy Hobart, and Guderian kept abreast of Hobart's writings. In 1924, he was appointed as an instructor and military historian at Stettin. As a lecturer he was polarizing; some of his pupils enjoyed his wit, but he alienated others with his biting sarcasm.

In 1927, Guderian was promoted to major and in October he was posted to the transport section of the Truppenamt, a clandestine form of the army's General Staff, which had been forbidden by the Treaty of Versailles. By the autumn of 1928, he was a leading speaker on tanks; however, he did not set foot in one until the summer of 1929, when he briefly drove a Swedish Stridsvagn m/21-29. In October, 1928 he was transferred to the Motor Transport Instruction Staff to teach. In 1931, he was promoted to lieutenant-colonel and became chief of staff to the Inspectorate of Motorized Troops under Oswald Lutz. This placed Guderian at the center of Germany's development of mobile warfare and armored forces.

=== Panzer Division and mobile warfare ===
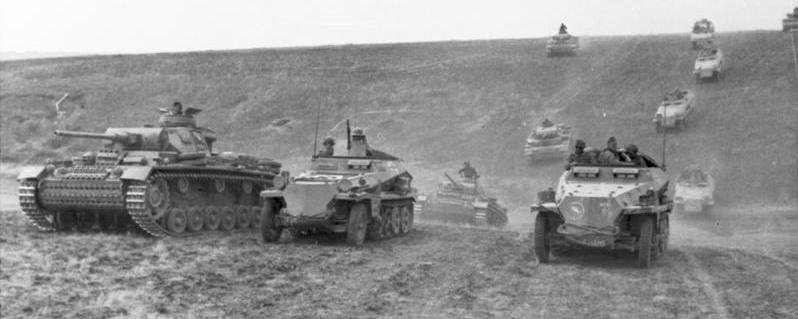
Guderian helped develop panzer divisions and the blitzkrieg approach

In the 1930s, Guderian played a significant role in the development of both the panzer division concept and a doctrine of mechanized offensive warfare that would later become known as blitzkrieg. Guderian's 3rd Motor Transport Battalion became the blueprint for the future German armored force. However, his role was less central than he claimed in his memoirs and that historians repeated in the postwar era.

Guderian and his immediate superior Lutz had a symbiotic relationship. Both men worked tirelessly with the shared aim of creating a panzer force. Guderian was the public face advocating mechanized warfare and Lutz worked behind the scenes. Guderian reached into the Nazi regime to promote the panzer force concept, attract support and secure resources. This included a demonstration of the concept to Hitler himself. Lutz persuaded, cajoled and compensated for Guderian's often arrogant and argumentative behavior towards his peers. The modern historian Pier Battistelli writes that it is difficult to determine exactly who developed each of the ideas behind the panzer force. Many other officers, such as Walther Nehring and Hermann Breith, were also involved. However, Guderian is widely accepted as having pioneered the communications system developed for the panzer units. The central tenets of blitzkrieg – independence, mass and surprise – were first published in doctrinal statements of mechanized warfare by Lutz.

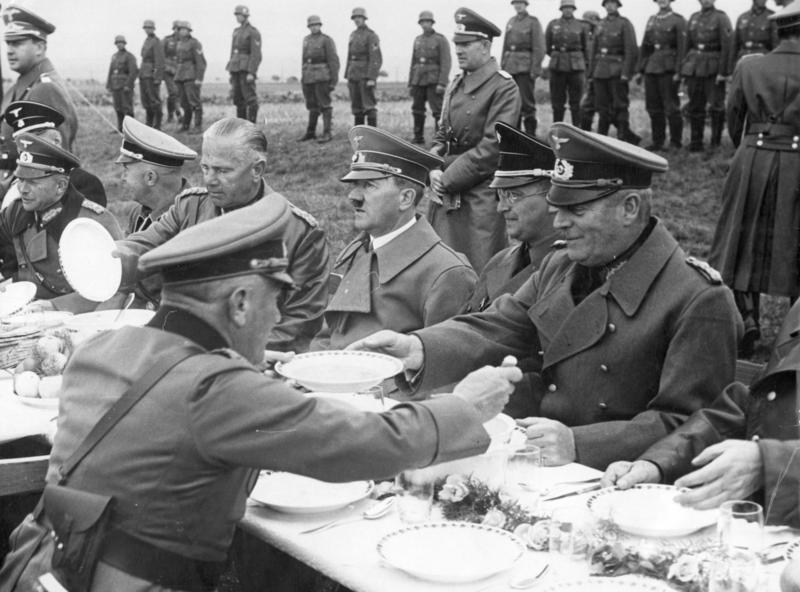
Guderian (far left) eats with Hitler and other generals at a dinner table in the Sudetenland, 3 October 1938

During the autumn of 1936, Lutz asked Guderian to write Achtung – Panzer! He requested a polemical tone that promoted the Mobile Troops Command and strategic mechanized warfare. In the resulting work, Guderian mixed academic lectures, a review of military history and armored warfare theory that partly relied on a 1934 book on the subject by Ludwig von Eimannsberger. While limited, the book was in many respects a success. It contained two important questions which would require answering if the army was to be mechanized: how will the army be supplied with fuel, spares and replacement vehicles; and how to move large mechanized forces, especially those that are road-bound? He answered his own questions in discussions of three broad areas: refueling; spare parts; and access to roads.

In 1938, Hitler purged the army of personnel who were unsympathetic to the Nazi regime. Lutz was dismissed and replaced by Guderian. In the spring of that year, Guderian had his first experience of commanding a panzer force during the annexation of Austria. The mobilization was chaotic: tanks ran out of fuel or broke down and the combat value of the formation was non-existent. Had there been any real fighting Guderian would certainly have lost. He stood beside the Führer in Linz as Hitler addressed Germany and Austria in celebration. Afterwards, he set about remedying the problems that the panzer force had encountered. In the last year before the outbreak of World War II, Guderian fostered a closer relationship with Hitler. He attended opera with the Führer and received invitations to dinner. When Neville Chamberlain, in his policy of appeasement, gave Hitler the Sudetenland, it was occupied by Guderian's XVI Motorized Corps.

== Second World War ==
=== Invasion of Poland ===
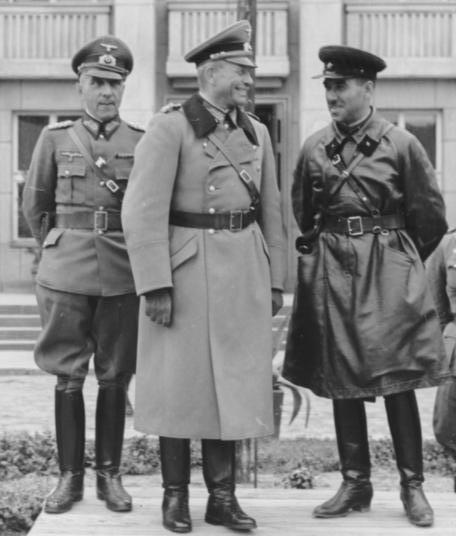
Guderian (middle) with Mauritz von Wiktorin (left) and Soviet Kombrig Semyon Krivoshein at the German–Soviet military parade in Brest-Litovsk after the invasion of Poland, 1939

During August, 1939 Guderian took command of the newly formed XIX Army Corps. At short notice he was ordered to spearhead the northern element of the invasion of Poland which began on 1 September. Under his corps command was one of Germany's six panzer divisions; Guderian's corps controlled 14.5 per cent of Germany's armoured fighting vehicles. His task was to advance through the former West Prussian territory (which included his birthplace of Kulm), then travel through East Prussia before heading south towards Warsaw. Guderian used the German concept of "leading forward", which required commanders to move to the battlefront and assess the situation. He made use of modern communication systems by travelling in a radio-equipped command vehicle with which he kept himself in contact with corps command.

By 5 September, XIX Corps had linked up with forces advancing west from East Prussia. Guderian had accomplished his first operational victory and he gave a tour of the battlefield to Hitler and Heinrich Himmler, head of the SS. The next day, he shifted his corps across East Prussia to participate in the advance on Warsaw. On 9 September his corps was reinforced by 10 Panzer Division and he continued deeper into Poland, finishing at Brest-Litovsk. In ten days Guderian's XIX Corps advanced 330 kilometres (210 mi), at times against strong resistance. The tank had proven itself to be a powerful weapon, with only 8 destroyed out of 350 employed. On 16 September, Guderian launched an attack on Brest Litovsk; the next day the Soviet Union invaded Poland. He issued an ultimatum to the city—surrender to the Germans or Soviets – the garrison capitulated to the Germans. The Soviet Union's entry into the war shattered Polish morale and Polish forces began to surrender en masse to Guderian's troops. At the conclusion of the campaign, Guderian was awarded a Knight's Cross of the Iron Cross.

Historian Russell Hart writes that Guderian supported the invasion because he "despised the Catholic, Slavic Poles who now occupied parts of his native, beloved Prussia". Foremost in his mind was the "liberation" of his former family estate at Gross-Klonia; Guderian ordered the advance on Gross-Klonia at night and through fog, leading to what he subsequently admitted were "serious casualties".

During the invasion, the German military mistreated and killed prisoners of war, ignoring both the Geneva Convention and their own army regulations. Guderian's corps withdrew before the SS began its ethnic cleansing campaign. He learned of murder operations and of Jews being forced into Nazi ghettos from his son, Heinz Günther Guderian, who had witnessed some of them. There is no record of him having made any protest.

=== Invasion of France and the Low Countries ===
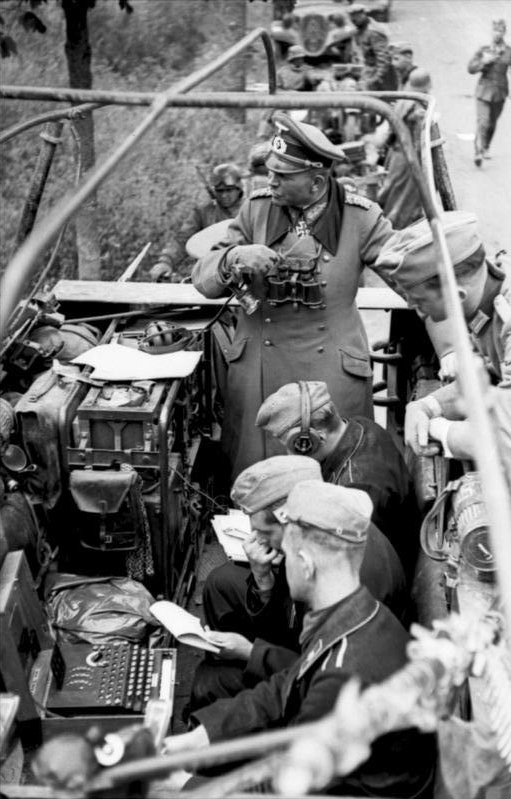
Guderian (standing) with an Enigma machine in a half-track being used as a mobile command center during the Battle of France, 1940

Guderian was involved in the strategic debates that preceded the invasion of France and the Low Countries. The plan was being developed by his classmate at the 1907 War Academy, Erich von Manstein. The Manstein Plan shifted the weight of the armoured formations away from a head-on attack through the Low Countries to one through the Ardennes. Guderian confidently proclaimed the feasibility of taking armor through the hilly Ardennes Forest and was subsequently told he may have to command the spearhead of the attack himself. He then complained about the lack of resources until he was given seven mechanized divisions with which to accomplish the task. The plan established a force for the penetration of the forest that comprised the largest concentration of German armor to that date: 1,112 out of Germany's total of 2,438 tanks.

Guderian's corps spearheaded the drive through the Ardennes and over the Meuse River. He led the attack that broke the French lines at the Battle of Sedan. Guderian's panzer group led the "race to the sea", ending with the British Expeditionary Force (BEF) and French forces trapped at Dunkirk. A British counter-attack at Arras on 21 May slowed down the German advance and allowed the BEF to establish defenses around points of evacuation, while Hitler, conscious of potential reverses and of allowing unsupported armor into urban fighting, issued the order to halt. A general resumption of the attack was ordered on 26 May, but by that time the Allied forces rallied, offering stiff resistance. On 28 May, with his losses mounting, Guderian advised the abandonment of the armoured assault in favor of a traditional artillery-infantry operation. Guderian was then ordered to advance to the Swiss border. The offensive started at the Weygand Line on 9 June and finished on 17 June with the encirclement of the Maginot Line defences and the remaining French forces.

Despite the success of the invasion, French defeat was not inevitable; the French had better, more numerous military equipment and were not overwhelmed by a numerically or technologically superior military force. Instead, the French loss stemmed from poor army morale, faulty military strategy and a lack of coordination among Allied troops. Hitler and his generals became overconfident after their historic victory, and came to believe they could defeat the Soviet Union: a country with significantly more natural resources, manpower and industrial capacity.

=== Invasion of the Soviet Union ===
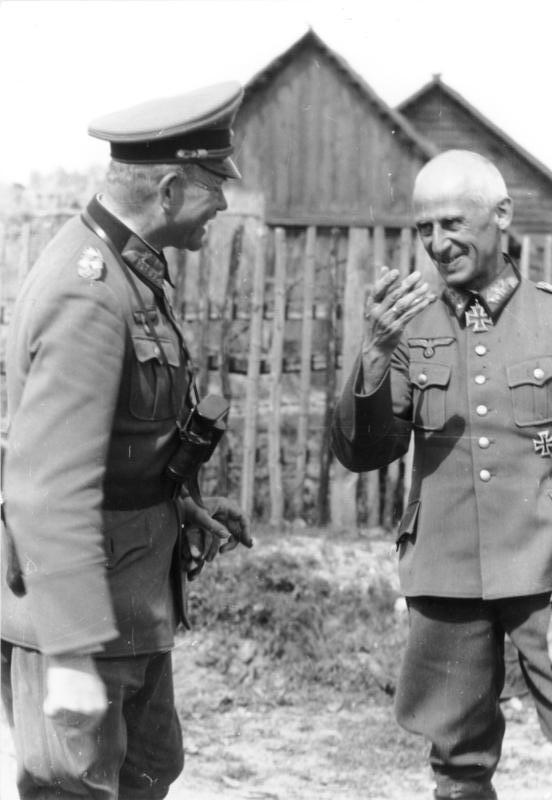
Generals Guderian and Hermann Hoth, 21 June 1941

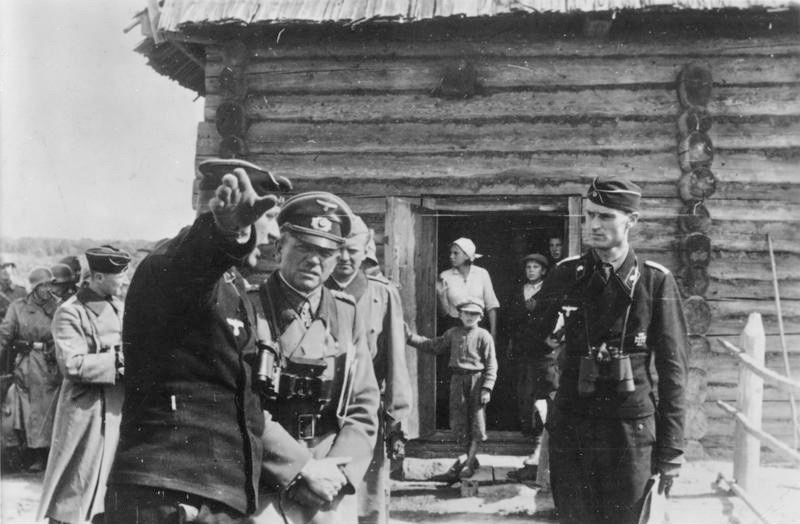
Guderian inspecting a panzer regiment during Operation Barbarossa, August 1941

In Guderian's 1937 book Achtung – Panzer! he wrote that "the time has passed when the Russians had no instinct for technology" and that Germany would have to reckon "with the Eastern Question in a form more serious than ever before in history". However, during the planning for Operation Barbarossa—the German invasion of the Soviet Union—he had become optimistic about the supposed superiority of German arms. By May, 1941 Guderian had accepted Hitler's official position that Operation Barbarossa was a preemptive strike. He had accepted some core elements of National Socialism: the Lebensraum concept of territorial expansion and the destruction of the supposed Judeo-Bolshevik threat.

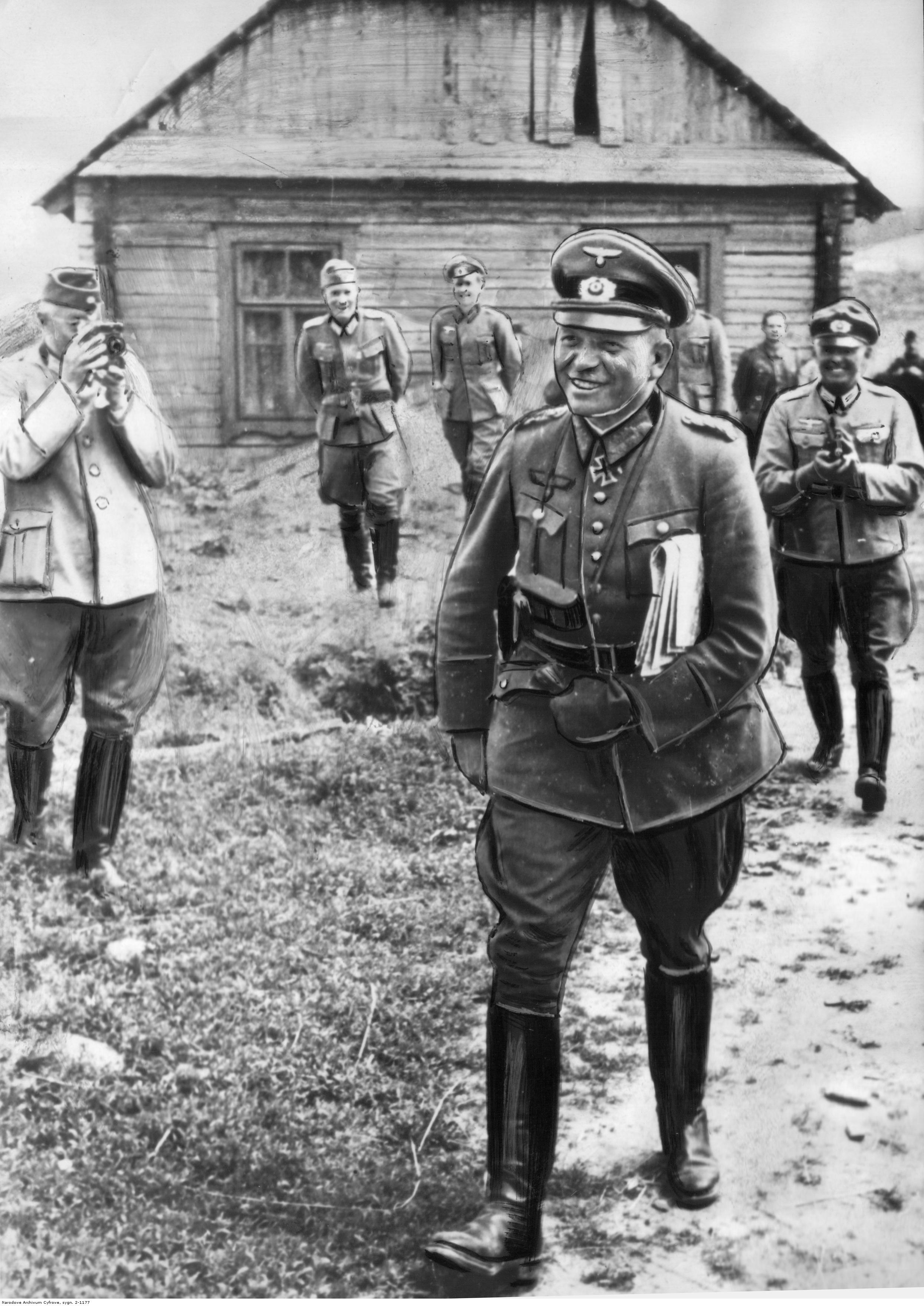
Guderian (foreground) on his way to a staff meeting; one of the soldiers surrounding him takes a picture of him, 1 August 1941

Guderian's 2nd Panzer Group began its offensive on 22 June by crossing the Bug River and advancing towards the Dnieper. The combined forces of 2nd and 3rd Panzer Groups closed the Minsk pocket, taking 300,000 prisoners before attacking towards Smolensk. Guderian was awarded a Knight's Cross with Oak Leaves on 17 July 1941. Following the conclusion of the Battle of Smolensk, which ended with the encirclement and destruction of the Soviet 16th, 19th and 20th Armies, General Franz Halder, Chief-of-Staff of the OKH, argued in favor of the all-out drive toward Moscow. Halder had Guderian fly to Führer Headquarters to argue the Army's case for continuing the assault against Moscow. Guderian, who had just recently been vehemently opposed to Hitler's plan for the drive to the south, unexpectedly sided with the dictator. This abrupt change of heart angered both Halder and Field Marshal Fedor von Bock, commander of Army Group Centre, and turned Guderian into somewhat of a pariah amid Army leaders.

By 15 September, German forces including the 1st and 2nd Panzer Groups had completed the largest encirclement in history: the Battle of Kiev. Owing to the 2nd Panzer Group's southward turn during the battle, the Wehrmacht destroyed the entire Southwestern Front east of Kiev, inflicting over 600,000 losses on the Red Army by 26 September. However, the campaign had been costly; the German forces had just half the tanks they had three months earlier. They were bogged down in a war of attrition for which the Wehrmacht was not prepared. Guderian's 2nd Panzer Group was in the worst shape; it had just 21 per cent of its tanks in working order. In mid-September, he was ordered to make a drive for Moscow. On 30 September the Battle of Moscow began. On 4 October, the 4th Panzer Division, part of the 2nd Panzer Group, suffered a severe setback at Mtsensk, near Oryol. Guderian demanded an inquiry into the realities of tank warfare on the Eastern Front, eventually suggesting in November to senior German tank designers and manufacturers that the quickest solution was to produce a direct copy of the Soviet T-34 tank.

By November, the attack by the 2nd Panzer Group on Tula and Kashira, 125 km (78 mi) south of Moscow, achieved limited success, while Guderian vacillated between despair and optimism, depending on the situation at the front. Facing pressure from the German High Command, Field Marshal Günther von Kluge finally committed the weaker south flank of his 4th Army to the attack on 1 December. In the aftermath of the battle, Guderian blamed slow commitment of 4th Army to the attack for the German failure to reach Moscow. This assessment grossly overestimated the capabilities of Kluge's remaining forces. It also failed to appreciate the reality that Moscow was a metropolis that German forces lacked the numbers to either encircle or to capture in a frontal assault. In the aftermath of the German failure, Guderian refused to pass on Hitler's 'stand fast' order and fell out with Kluge, the new commander of the Army Group Centre. Guderian was relieved of command on 25 December.

The German formations on the Eastern Front ubiquitously implemented the criminal Commissar Order and the Barbarossa Decree. For all divisions within Guderian's panzer group where files are preserved, there is evidence of illegal reprisals against the civilian population. In his memoirs, Guderian denied having given the Commissar Order. However, General Joachim Lemelsen, a corps commander within Guderian's panzer group, is documented as saying "prisoners, who could be shown to have been commissars, had to be immediately taken aside and shot" – and that the order came directly from Guderian. Reporting to the OKW, Guderian is documented as saying his panzer group had "shunted off" 170 commissars by the beginning of August.

=== Inspector General of Armoured Troops ===
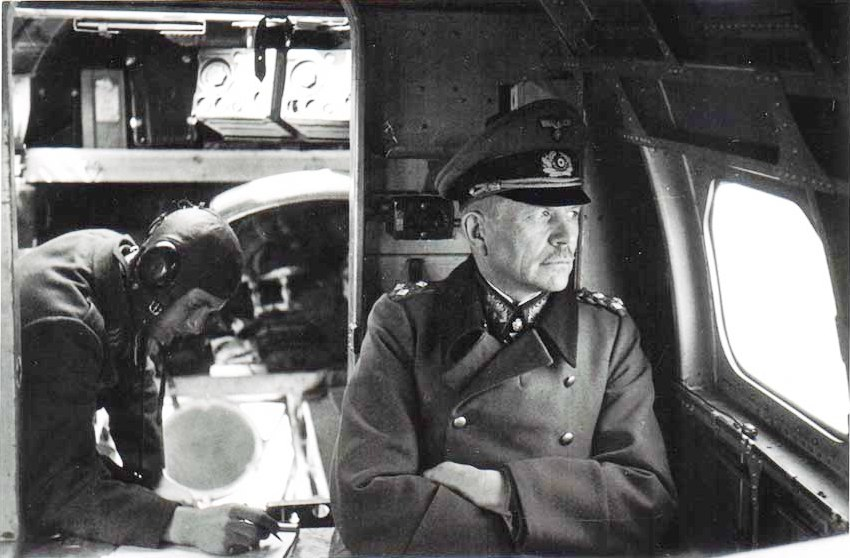
Guderian being transported to the Eastern Front, 1943

On 1 March 1943, after the German defeat in the Battle of Stalingrad, Hitler appointed Guderian to the newly created position of Inspector General of Armoured Troops. The latter had successfully lobbied to be reinstated, resulting in the new posting. Guderian's responsibilities were to oversee the panzer arm and the training of Germany's panzer forces. He established a collaborative relationship with Albert Speer regarding the manufacture and development of armored fighting vehicles. The military failures of 1943 prevented Guderian from restoring combat power to the armored forces to any significant degree. He had limited success with improved tank destroyers and fixing flaws in the third generation of tanks, the Panther and the Tiger. Guderian was also involved in the development of at least one armored vehicle of another Axis member state—the Romanian Mareșal tank destroyer.

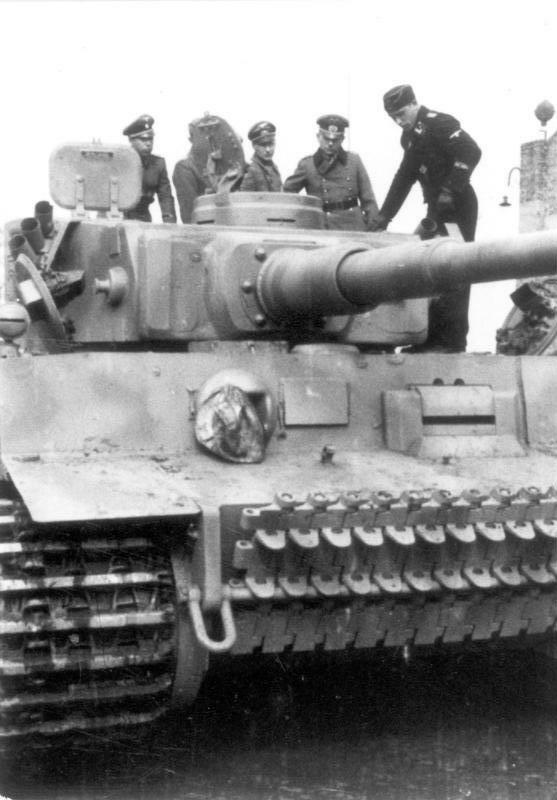
Guderian (second from right) inspecting a Tiger I tank, 1943

Operation Citadel, the last major German offensive operation in the east, was an attempt by the German army to regain the initiative. Guderian opposed the offensive, on the grounds that a victory would be extremely costly and would achieve little, saying "it is a matter of profound indifference to the world whether we hold Kursk or not". In a conversation with Hitler prior to the offensive, Guderian said: "Why are we attacking in the east at all this year?" Hitler responded, "You are right. Whenever I think of this attack, my stomach turns over." Guderian concluded, "Then you have the right attitude towards this situation. Leave it alone."

=== Acting Chief of Army General Staff ===
Guderian became the Acting Chief of the General Staff of the Army High Command with the responsibility of advising Hitler on the Eastern Front. He replaced General of the Infantry Kurt Zeitzler, who had abandoned the position on 1 July after losing faith in Hitler's judgement and suffering a nervous breakdown.

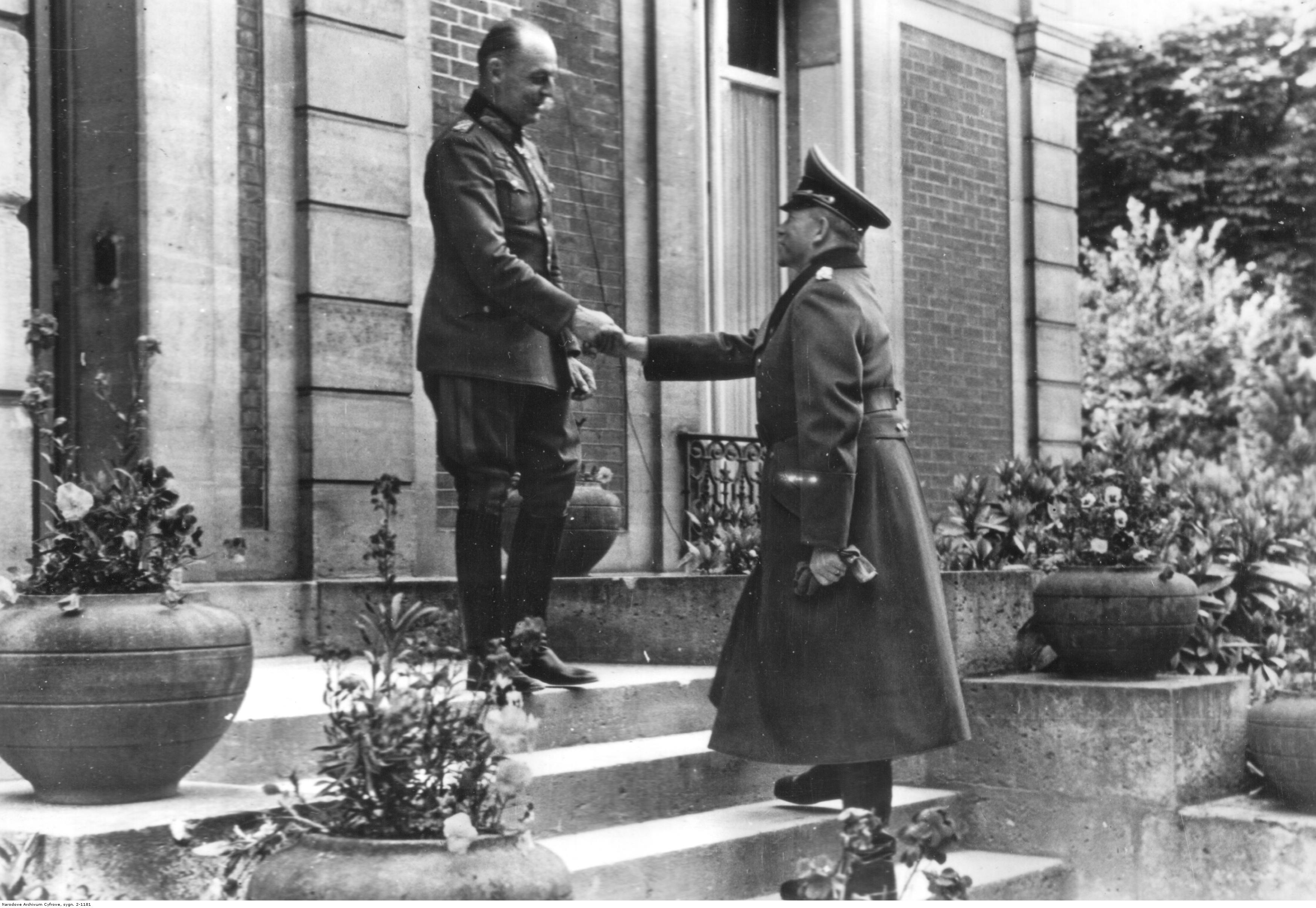
Guderian (right) greets Field Marshal Gerd von Rundstedt on the steps of his headquarters, May 1944

Germany was already heading to inevitable defeat, and Guderian could not shape the military situation nor Hitler's strategic decisions. Hitler placed Guderian in charge of the "Honour Court": a kangaroo court for those accused of involvement in the 20 July Plot. Guderian himself denied any involvement with the plot; nevertheless, he had unexpectedly retired to his estate on the day of the assassination attempt. The court discharged those found guilty of participating in the plot from the armed forces so that they could be tried by the People's Court, set up for the purpose of prosecuting the alleged plotters. Those accused were tortured by the Gestapo and executed by hanging. Some plotters were hanged by a thin hemp rope, by Hitler's direct orders, so that they slowly strangled to death after a lengthy agony.

Post-war, Guderian claimed that he had attempted to get out of this duty and that he had found the sessions "repulsive". In reality, Guderian had applied himself to the task with the vigour of a Nazi adherent, which perhaps was due to the desire to deflect attention from himself. Hart writes that he fought to save Erwin Rommel's chief of staff, Hans Speidel, because Speidel could have implicated Guderian in the plot.

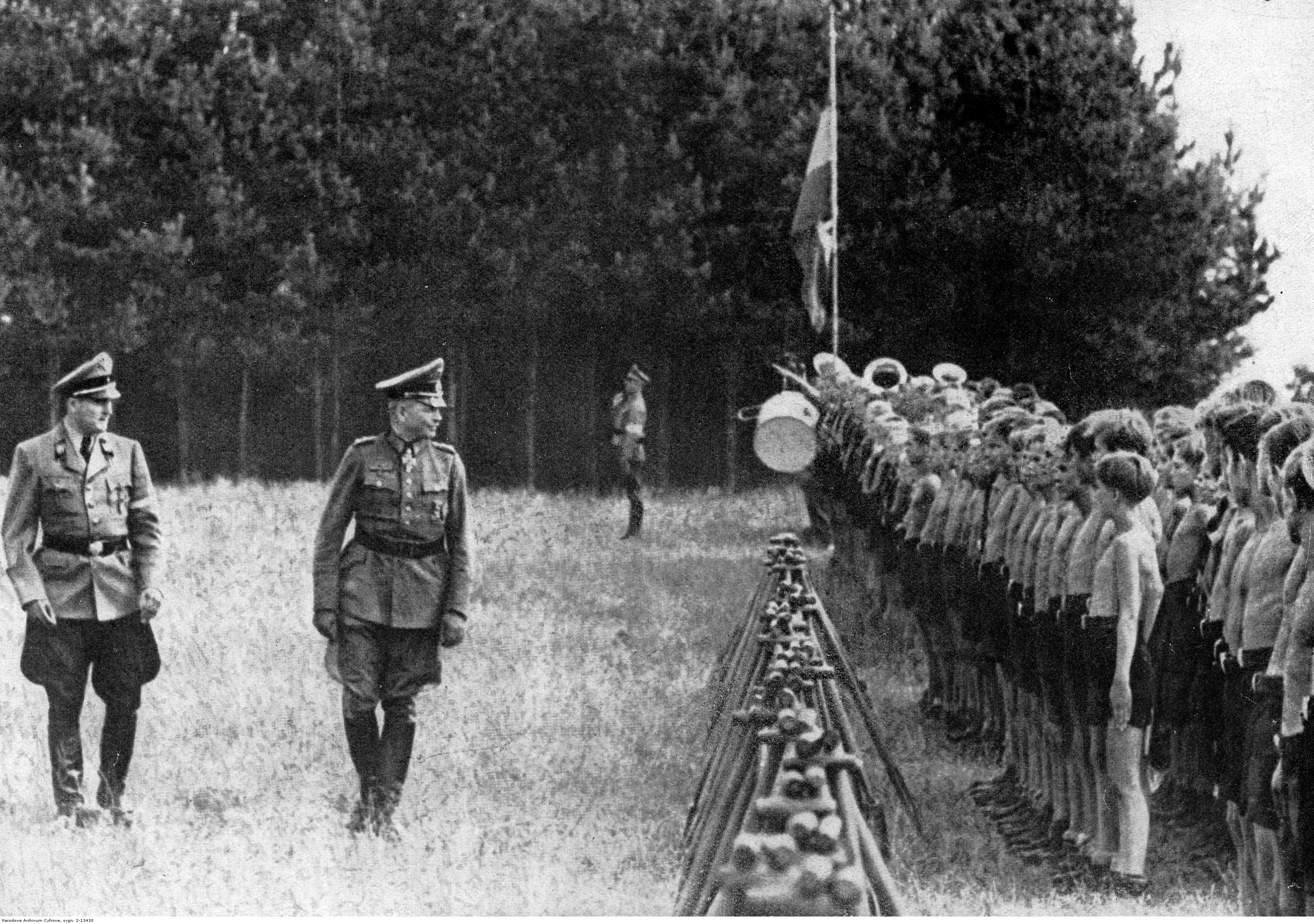
Guderian (second from left) and Reich Youth Leader Artur Axmann walk past the Hitlerjugend, September 1944

As head of the OKH, Guderian was faced with the pressing issues of the staff work being impacted by arrests, which among the OKH staff and their families eventually ran into the hundreds. Guderian had to fill serious gaps, such as one created by the suicide of General Eduard Wagner, the quartermaster general, in July. Even with vacancies filling up, a key problem remained: too many of the personnel were new to their roles and lacked institutional knowledge, including Guderian himself. Guderian relied heavily on Colonel Johann von Kielmansegg who was the most senior staff officer with experience at the OKH, but he was himself arrested in August. The situation was not improved by Guderian's long-standing bias against the General Staff, which he blamed for having allegedly opposed his attempts to introduce modern armored doctrine into the army back in the 1930s. The latter months of 1944 were marked by the ever-increasing strife between the OKH and the OKW (Oberkommando der Wehrmacht), as the two organizations competed for resources, especially in the run-up to the last-ditch German December, 1944 offensive on the Western Front. After the war, Guderian blamed Hitler for frittering away the last German reserves in the operation; nonetheless, Germany's strategic situation was such that even twenty or thirty extra divisions would not have helped.

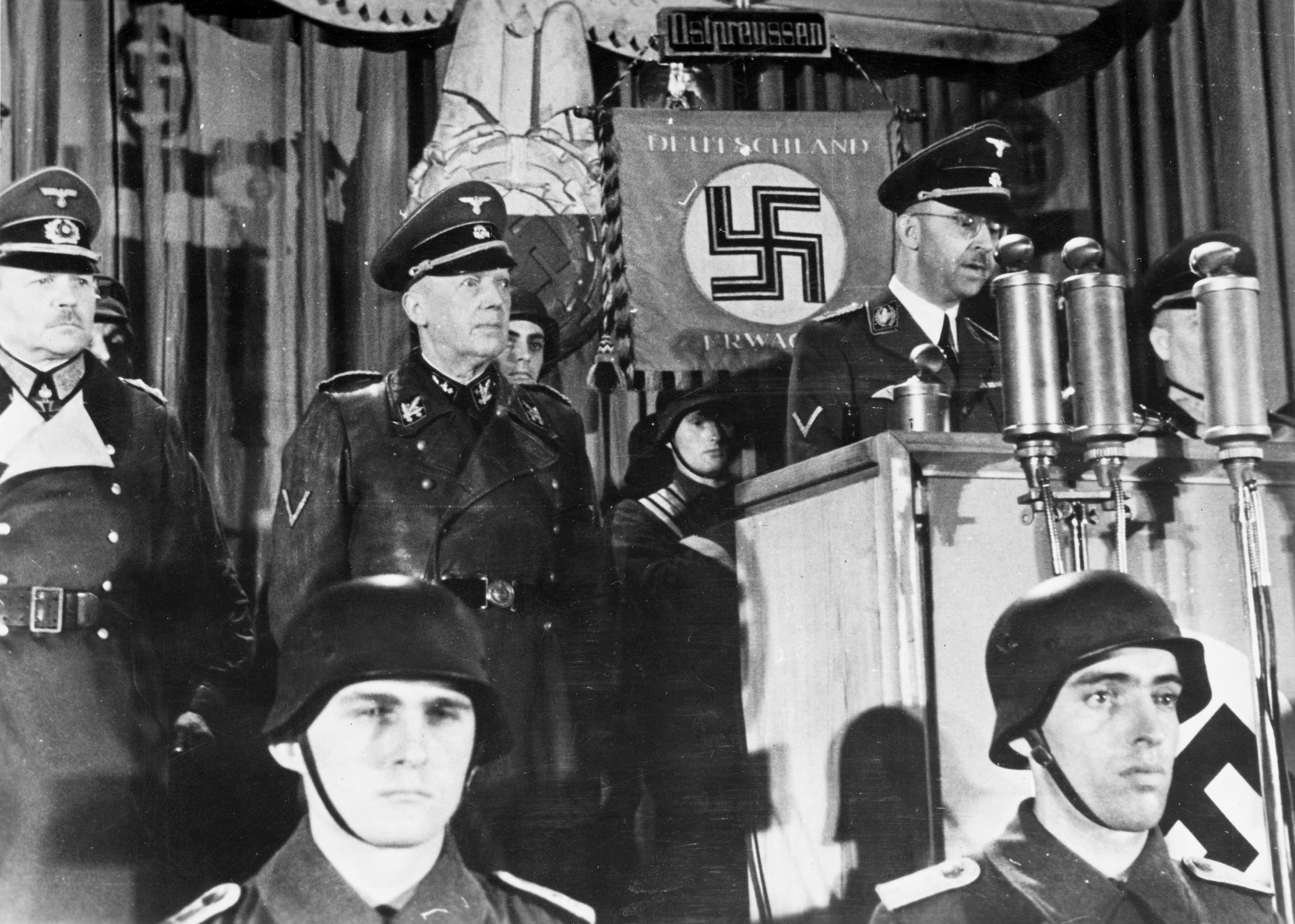
(Left to right) Guderian, Hans Lammers, and Himmler at a Volkssturm militia rally, October 1944

Guderian completed the total Nazification of the army general staff with a 29 July order that demanded that all officers join the party. He also made the Nazi salute obligatory throughout the armed forces. He supported the politicization of the military, but failed to see why other officers perceived him as a Nazi. As chief-of-staff of the OKH, Guderian did not object to the orders that Hitler and Himmler issued during the brutal suppression of the Warsaw Uprising nor the atrocities being perpetrated against the civilian population of the city. At a Volkssturm rally in November, 1944, Guderian said that there were "95 million National Socialists who stand behind Adolf Hitler".

After the war, Guderian claimed that his actions in the final months as head of the OKH were driven by a search for a solution to Germany's increasingly-bleak prospects. This was supposedly the rationale behind Guderian's plans to turn major urban centers along the Eastern Front into so-called fortress cities (feste Plätze). This fantastical plan had no hope of succeeding against the mobile operations of the Red Army. In any event, most of the "fortresses" were poorly provisioned and staffed by older garrison troops. On 28 March, following the failed operation to retake the town of Küstrin (now Kostrzyn nad Odrą in Poland), Guderian was sent on leave. He was replaced by General Hans Krebs.

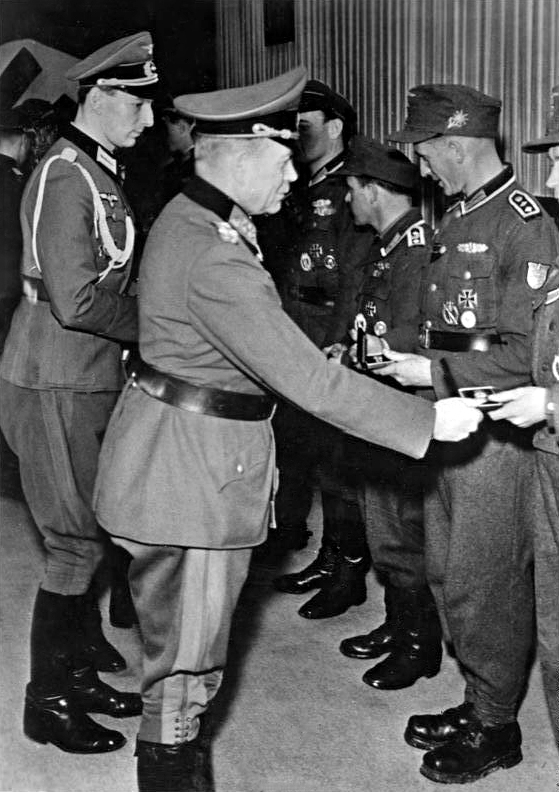
Guderian distributes awards to the army, 28 March 1945

Guderian cultivated close personal relationships with the most powerful people in the regime. He had an exclusive dinner with Himmler on Christmas Day, 1944. On 6 March 1945, shortly before the end of the war, Guderian participated in a propaganda broadcast that denied the Holocaust; the Red Army in its advance had just liberated several extermination camps. Despite the general's later claims of being anti-Nazi, Hitler most likely found Guderian's values to be closely aligned with Nazi ideology. Hitler brought him out of retirement in 1943 and especially appreciated the orders he issued in the aftermath of the failed plot.

== Later life and death ==
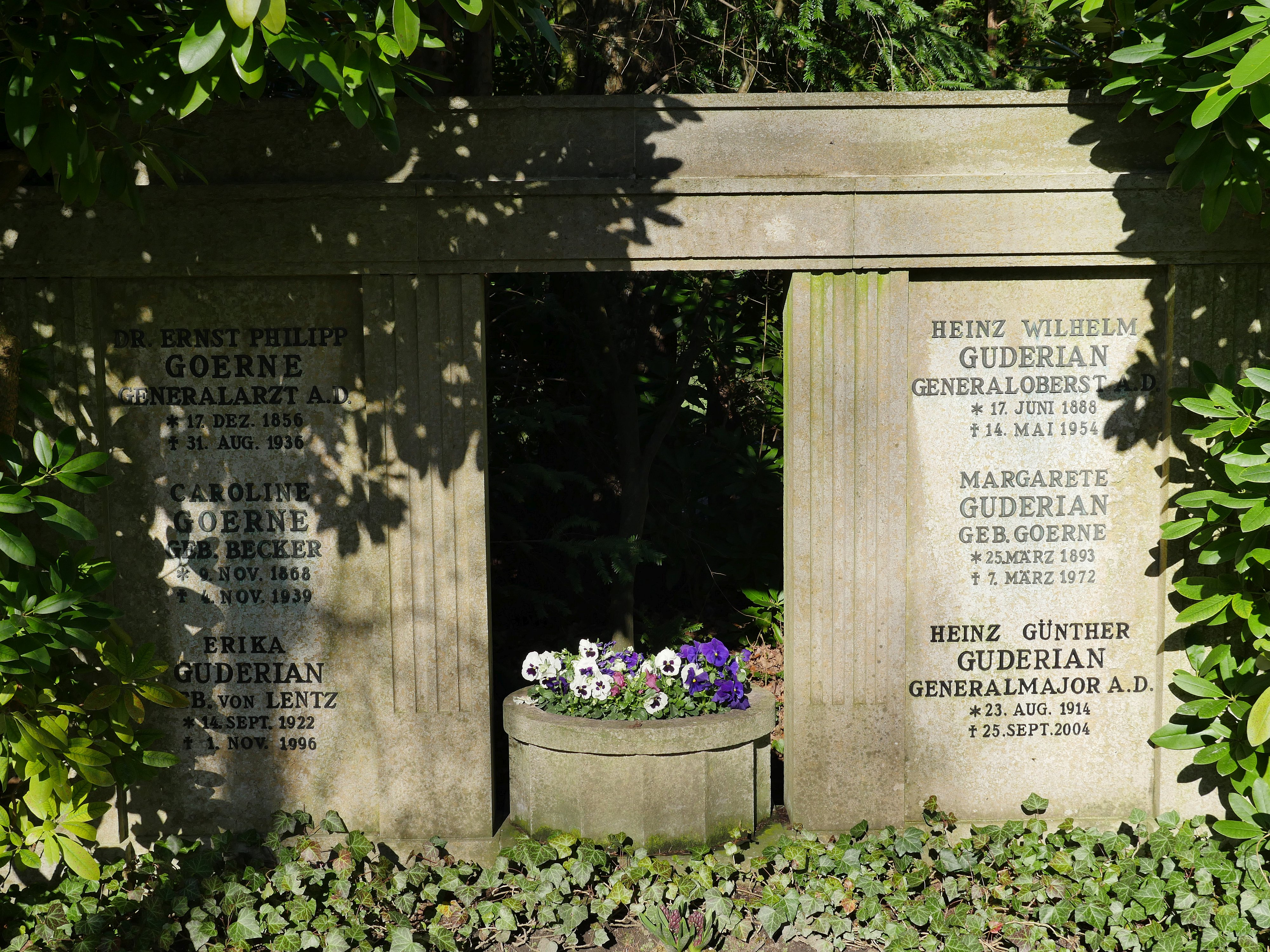
Guderian's grave

Guderian and his staff surrendered to US forces on 10 May 1945. He was not convicted as a war criminal at the Nuremberg Trials because there was no substantial documentary evidence against him. He answered questions from the Allied forces and denied being an ardent supporter of Nazism. The Central Intelligence Agency (CIA) was highly interested in using Guderian to rally the German right to the Atlanticist cause. He joined the US Army Historical Division in 1945 and the US refused requests from the Soviet Union to have him extradited. Even after the war, Guderian retained an affinity with Hitler and National Socialism. While interned by the Americans, his conversations were secretly taped. In one such recording, while conversing with former Field Marshal Wilhelm Ritter von Leeb and former General Leo Geyr von Schweppenburg, Guderian opined: "The fundamental principles [of Nazism] were fine".

Guderian was released from internment in 1948. Many of his peers spent more time in prison. Von Manstein was sentenced to 18 years (although released in 1953) and Albert Kesselring was given a life sentence. although released in 1952. Guderian had informed on his ex-colleagues and co-operated with the Allies, which had helped him evade prosecution. He retired to Schwangau near Füssen in Southern Bavaria and began writing. His most successful book was Panzer Leader.

He remained an ardent German nationalist for the rest of his life. Guderian died of heart disease on 14 May 1954 at the age of 65 and is buried at the Friedhof Hildesheimer Straße in Goslar.

== Writings and mythology ==
=== Panzer Leader myth ===
Guderian's post-war autobiography Panzer Leader was a success with the reading public. He cast himself as an innovator and the "father" of the German panzer arm, both before the war and during the blitzkrieg years. This allowed him to re-imagine himself as the master of the blitzkrieg between 1939 and 1941; however, this was an exaggeration. Guderian's German memoirs were first published in 1950. At that time, they were the only source on the development of panzer forces, German military records having been misplaced or lost. Consequently, historians based their interpretation of historical events upon Guderian's self-centred autobiography. Subsequent biographers supported the myth and embellished it. In 1952, Guderian's memoirs were reprinted in English. The British journalist and military theorist B. H. Liddell Hart gained access to a group of German generals, imprisoned in the No. 1 POW camp in Grizedale Hall in the north of England from 9 August 1945, as a Political Intelligence Department lecturer taking part in the Re-education programme, in an effort to use that to re-establish his reputation as a military theorist and commentator. He asked Guderian to say that he had based his military theories on Liddell Hart's; Guderian obliged. Liddell Hart, in turn, became an advocate for West German rearmament.

In newer studies, historians began to question Guderian's memoirs and criticize the myth that they had created. Battistelli, examining Guderian's record, said he was not the father of the panzer arm. He was one of a number of innovators. He stood out from his arguably more able compatriot, Lutz, for two reasons. Firstly, he sought the limelight, and secondly, he fostered a close relationship with Hitler. In portraying himself as the father of blitzkrieg and ingratiating himself with the Americans, he avoided being handed over to the Soviet Union. Battistelli writes that his most remarkable skill was not as a theoretician or commander, it was as an author. His books Achtung-Panzer! and Panzer Leader were a critical and commercial success upon publication and continue to be discussed, researched and analysed many years after his death.

Guderian was a capable tactician and technician, leading his troops successfully in the Invasion of Poland, the Battle of France and during the early stages of the invasion of the Soviet Union: especially in the advance to Smolensk and the Battle of Kiev. Liddell Hart writes that most of his success came from positions of substantial advantage, and he was never able to accomplish victory from a position of weakness. Hart suggests that his strengths were outweighed by his deficiencies, such as deliberately creating animosity between his panzer force and the other military arms, with disastrous consequences. His memoirs omitted mention of his military failings and his close relationship with Hitler. James Corum writes in his book The Roots of Blitzkrieg: Hans von Seeckt and German Military Reform that Guderian was an excellent general, a first-rate tactician and a man who played a central role in developing Panzer divisions, irrespective of his memoirs.

=== Myth of the clean Wehrmacht ===
Freelance historian Pier Battistelli argues that Guderian rewrote history in his memoirs, but notes that the biggest re-writing of history comes not in his putative fathering of the panzer force but in the cover-up of his culpability for war crimes during Operation Barbarossa. Units under his command carried out the Commissar Order, which entailed the murder of Red Army political officers. He also played a large role in the commission of reprisals after the Warsaw Uprising of 1944.

Like other generals, Guderian's memoirs emphasized his loyalty to Germany and the German people; however, he neglected to mention that Hitler bought this loyalty with bribes, including landed estates and a monthly payment of 2,000 ℛ︁ℳ︁. Guderian wrote in his memoirs that he had been given a Polish estate as a retirement gift. Worth 1.24 million ℛ︁ℳ︁, the estate covered an area of 2,000 acres (810 ha) and it was located at Deipenhof (now Głębokie, Poland) in the Warthegau area of occupied Poland. The occupants had been evicted. Guderian also did not mention that he had initially requested an estate three times larger, but he was turned down by the local Gauleiter, with support from Himmler. The Gauleiter balked at giving such an opulent estate to someone with the rank of only a Colonel-General. Guderian furnished the estate with property stolen by M-Aktion from the homes of French Jews.

In 1950, Guderian published a pamphlet entitled Can Europe Be Defended?, where he lamented that the Western powers had picked the wrong side to ally themselves with during the war, even as Germany "was fighting for its naked existence", as a "defender of Europe" against the supposed Bolshevik menace. Guderian issued apologetics for Hitler, writing: "For one may judge Hitler's acts as one will, in retrospect his struggle was about Europe, even if he made dreadful mistakes and errors". He claimed that only the Nazi civilian administration (not the Wehrmacht) was responsible for atrocities against Soviet civilians, and scapegoated Hitler and the Russian winter for the Wehrmacht's military reverses, as he later did in Panzer Leader; in addition, he wrote that six million Germans died during their expulsion from the Eastern territories by the Soviet Union and its allies, while also writing that the defendants executed at the Nuremberg trials (for war crimes such as the Holocaust) were "defenders of Europe".

Ronald Smelser and Edward J. Davies, in their book The Myth of the Eastern Front, conclude that Guderian's memoirs are full of "egregious untruths, half truths, and omissions", as well as outright "nonsense". Guderian claimed, contrary to historical evidence, that the criminal Commissar Order was not carried out by his troops because it "never reached [his] panzer group". He also lied about the Barbarossa Decree that preemptively exempted German troops from prosecution for crimes committed against Soviet civilians, claiming that it was never carried out either. Guderian claimed to have been solicitous towards the civilian population, that he took pains to preserve Russian cultural objects and that his troops had "liberated" Soviet citizens.

David Stahel writes that English-speaking historians too readily presented a distorted image of German generals in the post-war era. In his book Operation Barbarossa and Germany's Defeat in the East, Stahel wrote: "The men in control of Hitler's armies were not honourable men, carrying out their orders as dutiful servants of the state. With resolute support for the regime, the generals unquestioningly waged one war of aggression after the other, and, once Barbarossa began, willingly partook in the genocide of the Nazi regime".

=== In popular culture ===
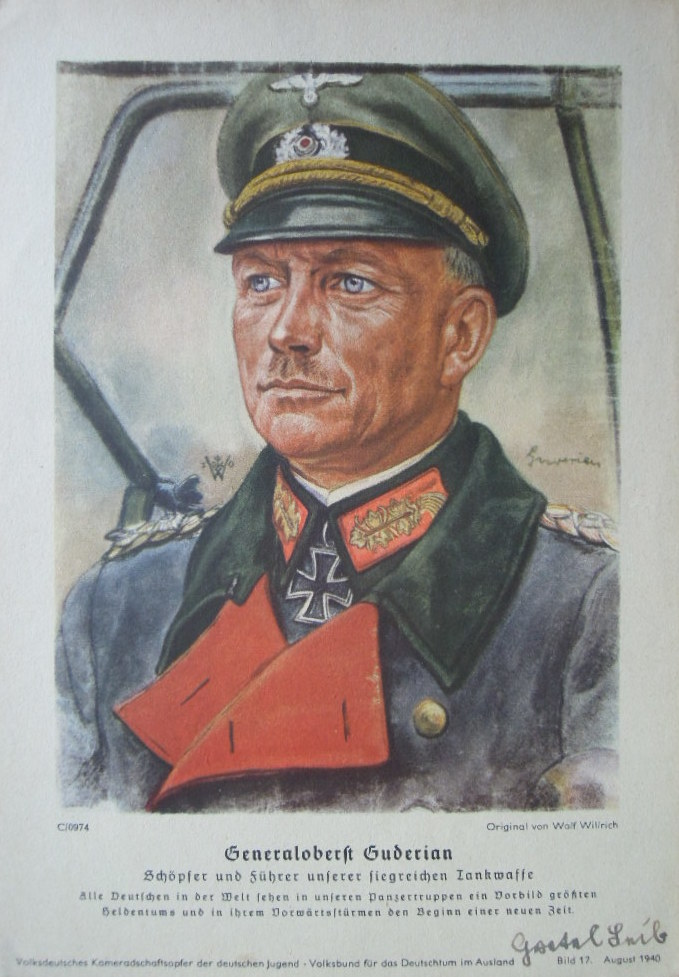
A postcard used to publicize Guderian during the war

Guderian's memoirs remain popular. The favourable descriptions started with the British journalist and military theorist B.H. Liddell Hart, who described Guderian as one of the "Great Captains of History" in a book published by the mass-market Ballantine Books in 1957. As late as 2002, for the 55th anniversary of the first publication of the book, The New York Times, Newsweek, The New Yorker and other outlets published positive reviews, reinforcing the tenets of the myth of the clean Wehrmacht. The reviews stressed the separation between the professional soldiers and the Nazi regime, while The New York Times Book Review described the book as one of the best written by former German generals. Kenneth Macksey in his biography eulogized Guderian, inflating his true accomplishments.

In 1976, the leading wargaming magazine, Strategy and Tactics, spotlighted Guderian in a featured game of the month called Panzergruppe Guderian. The magazine cover included a photo of Guderian in military dress, with his Knight's Cross and a pair of binoculars, suggesting a commanding role. The magazine featured a glowing profile of Guderian in which he was identified as the originator of blitzkrieg and lauded for his military achievements. Adhering to the postwar myths, the profile posited that a commander like this could "function in any political climate and be unaffected by it". Guderian thus came across as a consummate professional who stood apart from the crimes of the Nazi regime.

=== Works ===
- Guderian, Heinz (1937). Achtung – Panzer! (reissue ed.). Sterling Press. ISBN 0-304-35285-3. Guderian reviews the development of armoured forces in the European nations and Soviet Russia, and describes what he felt was essential for the effective use of armoured forces.
- Guderian, Heinz (1942). Mit Den Panzern in Ost und West [With the Panzers in the East and West]. Volk & Reich Verlag. OCLC 601435526.
- Guderian, Heinz (1950). Kann Westeuropa verteidigt werden? [Can Western Europe Be Defended?]. Plesse-Verlag. OCLC 8977019.
- Guderian, Heinz (1952). Panzer Leader. Da Capo Press Reissue edition, 2001. New York: Da Capo Press. ISBN 0-306-81101-4. Originally published in German, titled Erinnerungen eines Soldaten (Memories of a Soldier) (Kurt Vowinckel Verlag, Heidelberg 1950; 10th edition 1977).

== Awards ==
- Iron Cross (1914)
  - 2nd Class (17 September 1914)
  - 1st Class (8 November 1916)
- Knight 2nd class of the Friedrich Order with Swords (Württemberg) (15 December 1915)
- Saxe-Ernestine House Order Commander 2nd Class with Swords (1 July 1935)
- Wehrmacht Long Service Award 1st Class (1 October 1936)
- Royal Hungarian War Memorial Medal with Swords (14 January 1937)
- Honour Cross of the World War 1914/1918
- War Memorial Medal with Swords (Austria) (9 March 1937)
- Anschluss Medal (13 March 1938)
- Order of St. Sava 1st Class (21 November 1939)
- Clasp to the Iron Cross (1939)
  - 2nd Class (5 September 1939)
  - 1st Class (13 September 1939)
- Knight's Cross of the Iron Cross with Oak Leaves
  - Knight's Cross on 27 October 1939 as General der Panzertruppe and commanding general of the XIX. Army Corps
  - 24th Oak Leaves on 17 July 1941 as Generaloberst and commander-in-chief of the 2nd Panzer Group

== German Army Ranks (1908-1940) ==
Date of Ranks
German Army Ranks	Year
Fähnrich (German Imperial Army)	28 February 1907
Leutnant (German Imperial Army)	27 January 1908
Oberleutnant (German Imperial Army)	8 November 1914
Hauptmann (German Imperial Army)	18 December 1915
Major (Reichswehr)	1 February 1927
Oberstleutnant (Reichswehr)	1 February 1931
Oberst (Reichswehr)	1 October 1933
Generalmajor (Wehrmacht Heer)	1 August 1936
Generalleutnant (Wehrmacht Heer)	10 February 1938
General der Panzertruppe (Wehrmacht Heer)	23 November 1938
Generaloberst (Wehrmacht Heer)	19 July 1940

== See also ==
- Guderian-Plan – for the fortification of the German East Front in 1944
