= Mietlica, Kuyavian-Pomeranian Voivodeship =

Mietlica
- Village
- Location within Poland
- Coordinates: 52°32′40″N 18°23′3″E
- Country: Poland
- Voivodeship: Kuyavian-Pomeranian
- County: Inowrocław
- Gmina: Kruszwica

Mietlica [mjɛˈtlit͡sa] is a village in the administrative district of Gmina Kruszwica, within Inowrocław County, Kuyavian-Pomeranian Voivodeship, in north-central Poland.
