= Przedbojewice =

- Village
- Location within Poland
- Coordinates: 52°43′41″N 18°16′18″E
- Country: Poland
- Voivodeship: Kuyavian-Pomeranian
- County: Inowrocław
- Gmina: Kruszwica
- Time zone: UTC+1 (CET)
  - Summer (DST): UTC+2 (CEST)
- Vehicle registration: CIN

Przedbojewice [pʂɛdbɔjɛˈvit͡sɛ] is a village in the administrative district of Gmina Kruszwica, within Inowrocław County, Kuyavian-Pomeranian Voivodeship, in central Poland.

Five Polish citizens were murdered by Nazi Germany in the village during World War II.
