= Różniaty =

- Village
- Location within Poland
- Coordinates: 52°42′22″N 18°17′42″E
- Country: Poland
- Voivodeship: Kuyavian-Pomeranian
- County: Inowrocław
- Gmina: Kruszwica
- Population: 110

Różniaty [ruʐˈɲatɨ] is a village in the administrative district of Gmina Kruszwica, within Inowrocław County, Kuyavian-Pomeranian Voivodeship, in north-central Poland.
