= Głębokie, Kuyavian-Pomeranian Voivodeship =

Głębokie
- Village
- Location within Poland
- Coordinates: 52°39′N 18°26′E
- Country: Poland
- Voivodeship: Kuyavian-Pomeranian
- County: Inowrocław
- Gmina: Kruszwica

Głębokie [ɡwɛmˈbɔkʲɛ] (German: Gut Glembokie, 1939-45 Deipenhof) is a village in the administrative district of Gmina Kruszwica, within Inowrocław County, Kuyavian-Pomeranian Voivodeship, in north-central Poland.
