= Żwanowice =

- Village
- Location within Poland
- Coordinates: 52°38′55″N 18°18′29″E
- Country: Poland
- Voivodeship: Kuyavian-Pomeranian
- County: Inowrocław
- Gmina: Kruszwica

Żwanowice [ʐvanɔˈvit͡sɛ] is a village in the administrative district of Gmina Kruszwica, within Inowrocław County, Kuyavian-Pomeranian Voivodeship, in north-central Poland.
