= Karczyn, Kuyavian-Pomeranian Voivodeship =

Karczyn
- Village
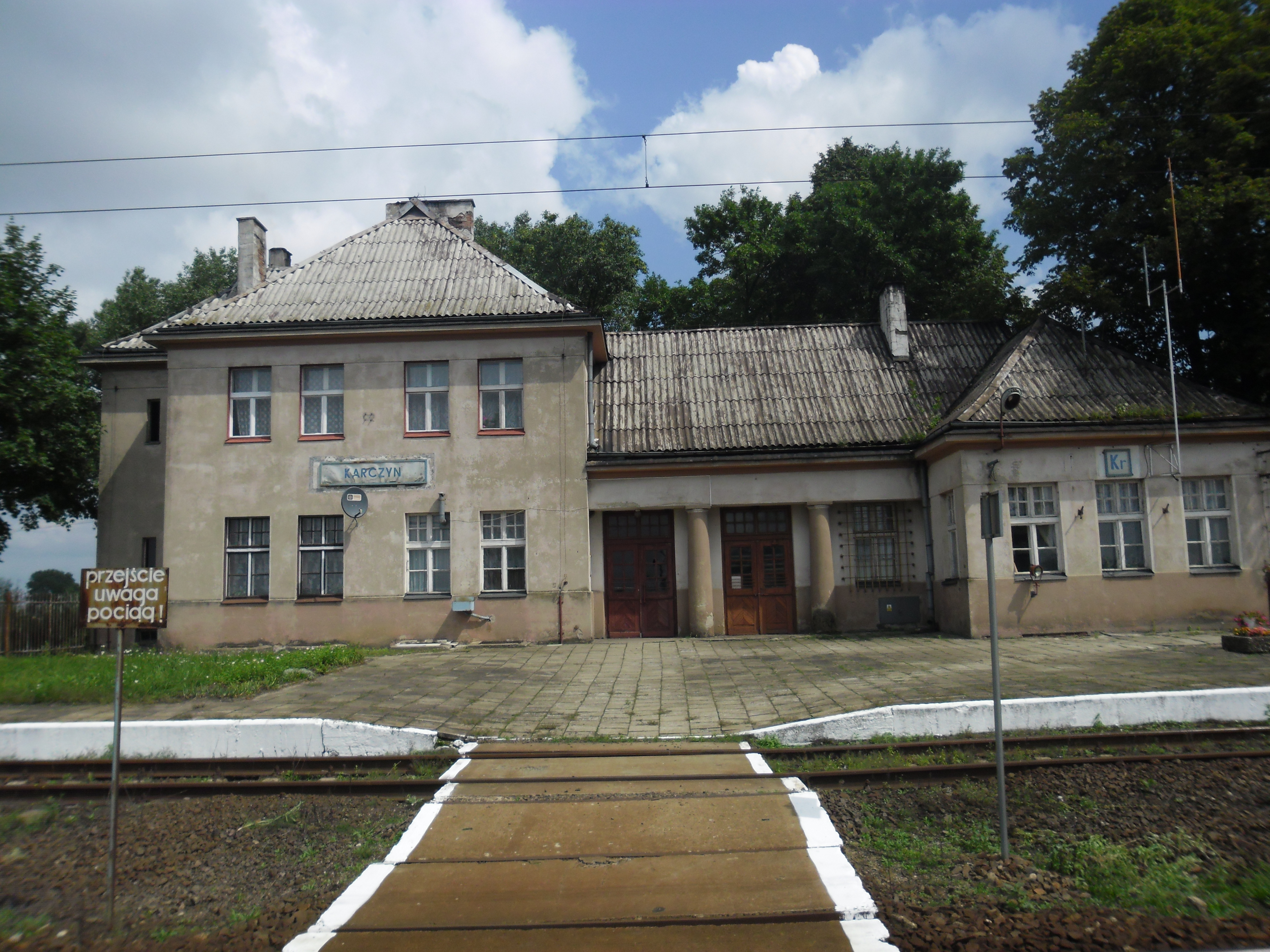
- Train station

- Location within Poland
- Coordinates: 52°44′N 18°23′E
- Country: Poland
- Voivodeship: Kuyavian-Pomeranian
- County: Inowrocław
- Gmina: Kruszwica

Karczyn [ˈkart͡ʂɨn] is a village in the administrative district of Gmina Kruszwica, within Inowrocław County, Kuyavian-Pomeranian Voivodeship, in north-central Poland.
