= Baranowo, Kuyavian-Pomeranian Voivodeship =

Baranowo
- Village
- Location within Poland
- Coordinates: 52°36′53″N 18°18′10″E
- Country: Poland
- Voivodeship: Kuyavian-Pomeranian
- County: Inowrocław
- Gmina: Kruszwica

Baranowo [baraˈnɔvɔ] is a village in the administrative district of Gmina Kruszwica, within Inowrocław County, Kuyavian-Pomeranian Voivodeship, in north-central Poland.
