= Kenneth Macksey =

British writer and historian (1923–2005)

Kenneth John Macksey MC (1 July 1923 – 30 November 2005) was a British author and historian who specialized in military history and military biography, particularly of the Second World War.

== Life ==
After serving in the Royal Armoured Corps from 1941 as a Driver Mechanic, Macksey was commissioned in 1944. He served during the rest of Second World War in the 79th Armoured Division under the command of Percy Hobart, earning a Military Cross; he later wrote a biography of Hobart. Macksey gained a permanent commission in 1946, was transferred to the Royal Tank Regiment in 1947, reached the rank of major in 1957 and retired from the Army in 1968.

Amongst many other books, Macksey wrote a volume of alternate history entitled Invasion, which dealt with a successful invasion of England by Germany in 1940. He also wrote the novel First Clash that describes a NATO–Warsaw Pact clash in the late 1980s and which seems in retrospect to be alternate history, but it was published in 1985 before the purported events of the conflict. First Clash was written under contract to the Canadian Forces and focuses on the Canadian role in such a conflict. Macksey also edited The Hitler Options, the first volume of a series of "alternate decisions" alternate history anthologies from Greenhill Books, in 1995.

In Macksey's Guderian: Panzer General, he debunked the view of historian Sir Basil Liddell-Hart regarding Hart's influence on the development of German tank theory before 1939.

== Publications ==
- The Shadow of Vimy Ridge. London: W. Kimber. 1965. OCLC 1601233.
- Armoured Crusader: A Biography of Major-General Sir Percy Hobart. London: Hutchinson. 1967. ISBN 0-09-084950-7.
- Africa Korps. New York: Ballantine Books. 1968. ISBN 0-345-21687-3.
- Panzer Division, the Mailed Fist. New York: Ballantine Books. 1968. ISBN 0-345-24992-5.
- Crucible of Power: The Fighting for Tunisia, 1942-1943. London: Hutchinson. 1969.
- Tank: A History of the Armoured Fighting Vehicle. London: Macdonald & Co. 1970. ISBN 0-356-03461-5. (with John H. Batchelor)
- Beda Fomm: Classic Victory. New York: Ballantine Books. 1971. ISBN 0-345-02434-6.
- Anatomy of a Battle. New York: Stein and Day. 1974. ISBN 0-8128-1650-1 – via Archive Foundation.
- The Partisans of Europe in World War II. London: HarperCollins. 1975. ISBN 978-0-246-10574-5.
- Guderian: Panzer General. London: Jane's Publishing. 1975. (Published in the US as Guderian: Creator of the Blitzkrieg. New York: Stein and Day. 1976. OCLC 3100080.; re-published as Guderian: Panzer General. London and Novato: Greenhill Books and Presidio Press. 1992. ISBN 1-85367-059-6.)
- Kesselring: The Making of the Luftwaffe. New York: David McKay Company. 1978.; re-published as Kesselring: German Master Strategist of the Second World War. London: Greenhill Books. 2000. ISBN 1-85367-422-2.
- Rommel: Battles and Campaigns. London: Arms and Armour Press. 1979. ISBN 0-85368-232-1.
- The Tanks: a History of the Royal Tank Regiment, 1945–1975. London: Arms and Armour Press. 1979. ISBN 978-0-85368-293-6.
- The Tank Pioneers. London, New York: Jane's Publishing. 1981. ISBN 0-531-03734-7.
- A History of the Royal Armoured Corps, 1914–1975. Beaminster: Newtown Publications. 1983. ISBN 0-950853-60-7.
- Invasion: The Alternate History of the German Invasion of England July 1940. Ashcroft: Wren's Park Publishing. 2001 [1980]. ISBN 0-905778-79-0.
- First Clash: Combat close-up in World War Three. New York: Sterling Publishing. 1985. ISBN 978-0-7737-2060-2.
- Military Errors of World War II. London: Arms and Armour Press. 1987. ISBN 0-85368-830-3 – via Archive Foundation.
- with William Woodhouse (1991). The Penguin Encyclopedia of Modern Warfare: 1850 to the Present Day. London: Viking Books. ISBN 0-670-82698-7.
- The Hitler Options: Alternate Decisions of World War II. London: Greenhill Books. 1995. ISBN 978-1-84832-780-1.
- Why the Germans Lose at War: The Myth of German Military Superiority. London: Greenhill Books. 1999 [1996]. ISBN 1-85367-383-8 – via Archive Foundation.
- Without Enigma: The Ultra and Fellgiebel Riddles. London: Sharpe Books. 2018 [2000]. ISBN 978-0-7110-2766-4.
- The Searchers: Radio Intercept in the Two World Wars. London: Sharpe Books. 2018 [2003]. ISBN 978-1-09-535843-6.
