= Achtung – Panzer! =

1937 book by Major-General Heinz Guderian

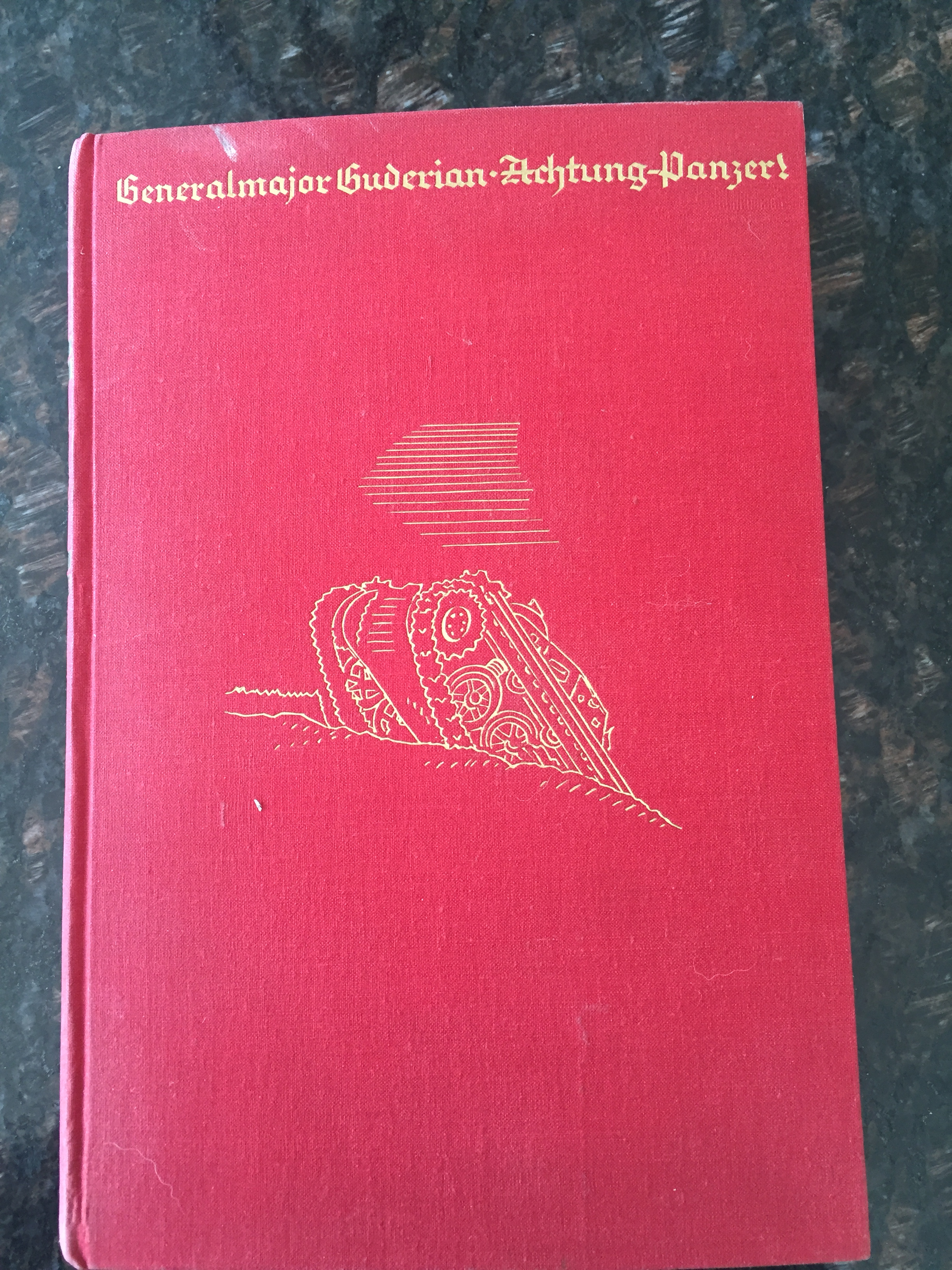
- Cover image of Guderian's book "Achtung Panzer"
- Author: Heinz Guderian
- Language: German
- Subject: Armoured warfare
- Published: Stuttgart
- Publication date: 1937
- Pages: 212 pages, [33] pages of plates (3 folded)
- OCLC: 37415025

Achtung – Panzer! (English: "Attention, Tank!" or, more idiomatically, "Beware the Tank!"), written by Major-General Heinz Guderian, a German World War II army general, is a book on the application of motorised warfare. First published in 1937, it expounds a new kind of warfare: the concentrated use of tanks, with infantry and air force in close support as combined arms, later known as Blitzkrieg tactics. The book also argues against the continued use of cavalry given the proven effectiveness of the machine gun, and advocates replacing the cavalry with mechanised infantry. It was never properly studied by the French or the British general staff, both of whom helped introduce the tank.

The first half of the book focuses on the advent of positional or 'trench warfare' in World War I, and the subsequent development of the first tanks. Here Guderian outlines the development of tanks and tank tactics throughout the Great War and during the interwar period. Later he discusses the effects of the Treaty of Versailles upon the German armed forces before detailing the recovery from the setbacks the Treaty caused in terms of development of mechanised forces. Guderian concludes by promoting the further development of the German tank force and providing suggestions concerning the future application of tanks and their relationship with other arms.

== Influence ==
"Achtung – Panzer!" influenced motorized warfare in modern warfare. It brought back the 19th century school of thought that advocated manoeuvre and decisive battle outcomes in military strategy. Widely popularized as "Blitzkrieg tactics", "Achtung – Panzer!" was the main driving force behind German armoured manoeuver warfare in World War II that was so successful in Europe and Africa. Despite tanks and armoured combat vehicles being originated by the British and French in the first World War, neither had thought of tank warfare as a form of combat, choosing instead to stick of World War I-era tactics, such as trench warfare and a defensive war, using infantry tanks and cruiser tanks.

Although the British and French were ahead of the Germans in tank technology before World War II, the neglect of armoured warfare tactics led to German Panzer-spearheaded attacks gaining the upper hand in France and the Low Countries. This lesson was learnt by the Soviet Union and the Americans, who eventually developed their own tanks capable of fighting the Panzers – such as the Soviet T-34 and its final upgraded version, T-34-85, as well as the American M4A3(76)W HVSS (M4A3E8) and the British Comet.

== Sources ==
- Edwards, Roger. (1989) Panzer, a Revolution in Warfare: 1939–1945. London/New York: Arms and Armour. ISBN 0-85368-932-6.
