= Janikowo, Gmina Kruszwica =

Janikowo
- Village
- Location within Poland
- Coordinates: 52°38′9″N 18°15′51″E
- Country: Poland
- Voivodeship: Kuyavian-Pomeranian
- County: Inowrocław
- Gmina: Kruszwica

Janikowo [janiˈkɔvɔ] is a village in the administrative district of Gmina Kruszwica, within Inowrocław County, Kuyavian-Pomeranian Voivodeship, in north-central Poland.
