= Baranowo, Pomeranian Voivodeship =

Baranowo
- Village
- Location within Poland
- Coordinates: 54°16′34″N 17°39′46″E
- Country: Poland
- Voivodeship: Pomeranian
- County: Bytów
- Gmina: Parchowo
- Population: 29

Baranowo [baraˈnɔvɔ] is a village in the administrative district of Gmina Parchowo, within Bytów County, Pomeranian Voivodeship, in northern Poland.

For details of the history of the region, see History of Pomerania.
