= Heinz Günther Guderian =

German Army officer in the Wehrmacht and Bundeswehr

- Born: 23 August 1914; Goslar, Prussia, German Empire (now in Lower Saxony)
- Died: 25 September 2004 (aged 90); Bad Godesberg, Bonn, Germany
- Relatives: Heinz Guderian (father)
- Military career
- Allegiance: Nazi Germany (1933 to 1945); West Germany (from 1956)
- Branch: Army (1933–45); Bundeswehr (1956–74)
- Service years: 1933–1945 (Wehrmacht); 1956–1974 (Bundeswehr)
- Rank: Oberstleutnant im Generalstab (Wehrmacht); Generalmajor (Bundeswehr)
- Units: 116. Panzerdivision
- Commands: General der Kampftruppen
- Conflicts: World War II
- Awards: Knight's Cross of the Iron Cross

Heinz Günther Guderian (23 August 1914 – 25 September 2004) was a German officer in the Wehrmacht and later a major general and Inspector of Panzer Troops in the West German Bundeswehr and NATO. He was the son of World War II General Heinz Guderian.

Born in Goslar in what was then the Prussian Province of Hanover, Heinz Günther Guderian entered the German Army as an officer cadet on 1 April 1933. He was promoted to second lieutenant in 1935 and served as a Zugführer (platoon leader), battalion and regimental adjutant and company commander in Panzer Regiments 1 and 35. He saw combat during the invasion of Poland and was wounded twice during the Battle of France in 1940. He graduated from the General Staff College in 1942 and served as a staff officer in various armored units until being assigned as the Operations Officer for the 116th Panzerdivision ("The Greyhounds") in May 1942, a position he held until the end of the War. He was captured at the conclusion of World War II and held as a prisoner of war until 1947. After the creation of the Bundeswehr, Guderian returned to the army and was given command of Panzerbattalion 3 (later 174) and, later, Panzerbrigade 14. He also served in a variety of staff assignments, culminating in service as Inspector of Panzer Troops — the same job his father held during World War II — for the Bundeswehr. He retired in 1974.

== Awards ==
- Iron Cross (1939)
  - Second Class
  - First Class
  - Knight's Cross of the Iron Cross
- Wehrmacht Long Service Award 4th Class
- Wound Badge in Silver
- Panzer Badge in Silver
- Federal German Grand Cross of the Order of Merit (21 December 1972)
- Swedish order of the Sword, commander 1st class (15 May 1972)

== Works by Guderian ==
- From Normandy to the Ruhr: With the 116th Panzer Division in WWII (The Aberjona Press, 2001) ISBN 0-9666389-7-2
