= Adolf von Brauchitsch =

German general (1876–1935)

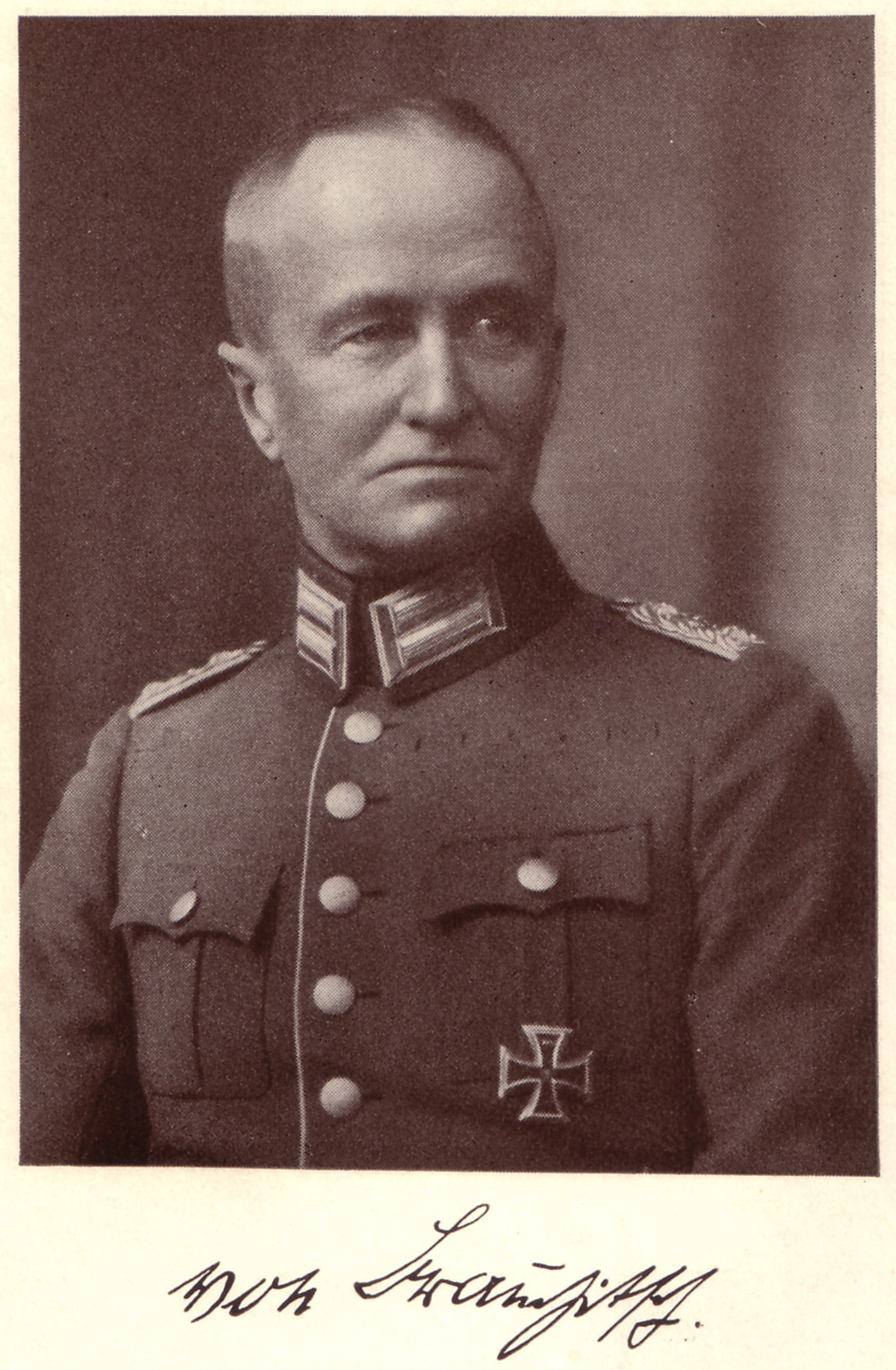
- Generalmajor Adolf von Brauchitsch
- Born: 7 November 1876; Berlin, German Empire
- Died: 21 January 1935 (aged 58); Chemnitz, Nazi Germany
- Relatives: Walther von Brauchitsch, Bernd von Brauchitsch and Manfred von Brauchitsch
- Military career
- Allegiance: German Empire (to 1918) (Germany) Weimar Republic (to 1929)
- Service years: 1895–1929
- Rank: Generalmajor
- Conflicts: World War I
- Awards: Iron Cross

Adolf Wilhelm Bernhard von Brauchitsch (7 November 1876 – 21 January 1935) was a German army officer with the rank of major general. A very experienced officer, he worked with the Army High Command under Hans von Seeckt and in the Ministry of the Reichswehr, before retiring in 1929 due to failing health.

== Biography ==
=== Family ===
Brauchitsch was born in Berlin as the son of a cavalry general (Bernhard Eduard von Brauchitsch). He was raised in the tradition of the Prussian officer corps. His aristocratic Silesian family later moved into the center of high society of Berlin.

=== Military career ===
Brauchitsch spent most of his pre-war career in the same manner as other Prussian officers, in many different military units. He would also spend this time doing ceremonial work in mid-November 1910 with the adjutant of Ernst II, Duke of Saxe-Altenburg. Between 1895 and 1913, he served in a Prussian Guards Regiment, a Thuringian Infantry Regiment, an Infantry Brigade, and finally, a Fusilier Company.

With the outbreak of World War I, Brauchitsch was promoted to company commander of the 20th Reserve Infantry Regiment. Later, he was a battalion commander in the 221st Reserve Infantry Regiment. There he was on 18 August 1916 promoted to major. After the war in January 1919 he was transferred back to the 7th Fusilier Regiment.

=== Inter-war years ===
After the demobilization of the army, he joined the provisional Reichswehr and was placed in the 13th Infantry Regiment. In October 1920, he was appointed commander of the 5th Battalion Infantry Regiment, and promoted to lieutenant colonel. In June 1923, he moved to the Ministry of the Reichswehr. In November 1923, he briefly worked with the Army High Command under Hans von Seeckt. In February 1926, he was promoted to colonel. In May 1926, he was transferred to the 12th Infantry Regiment in Halberstadt, in April 1928, he became its commander. He held this command up to his retirement in January 1929.

=== Retirement ===
On the day of his retirement, 31 January 1929, he was promoted to the rank of Major General. For his service in the army he was awarded with a total of 16 medals, including the Iron Cross.

=== Notable relatives ===
Brauchitsch was the brother of Walther von Brauchitsch, who would go on to become a field marshal and Commander-in-Chief of the German Army.

Brauchitsch was related to Manfred von Brauchitsch, a Mercedes-Benz "Silver Arrow" Grand Prix driver, and also Hans von Haeften and Werner von Haeften, both also army officers and later members of the German resistance against Hitler.

=== Death ===
Adolf von Brauchitsch died in Chemnitz, Germany on 21 January 1935 at age 58.

== Awards ==
- Order of the Crown IV
- Knight's Cross Second Class of the Order of the Zähringer Lion
- Knight's Cross Second Class of the Order of Henry the Lion
- Reusisches Cross of Honor III Class with Crown
- Knight's Cross Second Class of the Order of Albrecht
- Knight's Cross Second Class of the House Order of the White Falcon
- Knight's Cross, First Class of the Ducal Saxe-Ernestine House Order
- Duke Ernst Medal
- Cross of Honor III Class of Lippe House Order
- Knight's Cross, First Class of the Order of Friedrich
- Russian Order of St. Anne III Class
- Prussian Service Cross Award
- Iron Cross 2nd Class and Iron Cross 1st Class
- Knight's Cross of the Royal House Order of Hohenzollern with Swords
- Hanseatic Cross Hamburg
- Austrian Military Merit Cross III Class with War Decoration

== Dates of rank ==
- Leutnant (Lieutenant) - 22 March 1895
- Oberleutnant (First Lieutenant) - 27 January 1905
- Major (Major) - 18 August 1916
- Oberstleutnant (Lieutenant Colonel) - 1 May 1921
- Oberst (Colonel) - 1 February 1926
- Generalmajor (Brigadier General) - 31 January 1929
