= Eberhard von Brauchitsch =

German businessman

- Born: November 28, 1926; Berlin, Weimar Germany
- Died: September 7, 2010 (aged 83); Zürich, Switzerland
- Occupations: industrial manager, lawyer

Eberhard von Brauchitsch (28 November 1926 – 7 September 2010) was a German industrial manager. In his work for Flick KG, he was responsible for the donation of about 26 million Deutsche Mark to all the major German political parties and their associated foundations between 1969 and 1981. As a result of this scandal, he was sentenced to 2 years imprisonment on probation and 550,000 DM financial penalty for tax evasion. In 1982 he became a lawyer and management consultant.

== Biography ==
Brauchitsch was born in Berlin, Weimar Germany to Konrad von Brauchitsch and Edith, née de la Barre. The Brauchitsch family is a Silesian noble family originating from Brauchitschdorf, Silesia (modern Chróstnik, Poland). Brauchitsch attended school in Berlin and Bad Tölz, where he was a classmate of Friedrich Karl Flick.

He was conscripted as a Flakhelfer in 1943 and to the Wehrmacht in 1944. After World War II he passed his Abitur in 1946 and studied law at the University of Mainz and political sciences at the University of Amsterdam. He also studied at the London School of Economics and in The Hague.

In the 1950s Brauchitsch worked for Deutsche Lufthansa and became the first chief executive of the Deutsche Flugdienst GmbH. In 1960 he became the personal consultant of Friedrich Karl Flick and executive partner of the Flick KG in 1965. From 1971 to 1973 he was the chief representative of the Axel Springer AG but returned to the Flick KG after the death of Friedrich Flick (senior). He was responsible for the donation of about 26 million DM to all major German political parties and their associated foundations between 1969 and 1981. The Christian Democrats and the Christian Social Union of Bavaria received about 15 million DM, the Social Democrats about 6.5 million and the Liberals about 4.3 million. Sums between 40,000 and 250,000 DM were directly paid to politicians like Franz Josef Strauss, Willy Brandt and CDU bursar Walther Leisler Kiep. Helmut Kohl received in total 565,000 DM. Brauchitsch called this practise "cultivating the political scene".

These donations led to the Flick affair and the demission of Otto Graf Lambsdorff and Hans Friderichs, who had granted tax advantages to Friedrich Karl Flick after he had realized his 40 percent share of Mercedes-Benz stocks valuing 1.9 billion DM. Brauchitsch was sentenced to 2 years imprisonment on probation and 550,000 DM financial penalty for tax evasion. He left the Flick KG in 1982 and worked as a lawyer and management consultant.

Brauchitsch was married to Helga née Hempe since 1952, they had three daughters and one son. After both had suffered from long and severe illnesses, Brauchitsch and his wife committed suicide together in Zürich, aided by the Swiss pro-euthanasia group EXIT.

== Awards ==
- Federal Cross of Merit (1st class)
