= Brauchitsch =

Prussian noble family

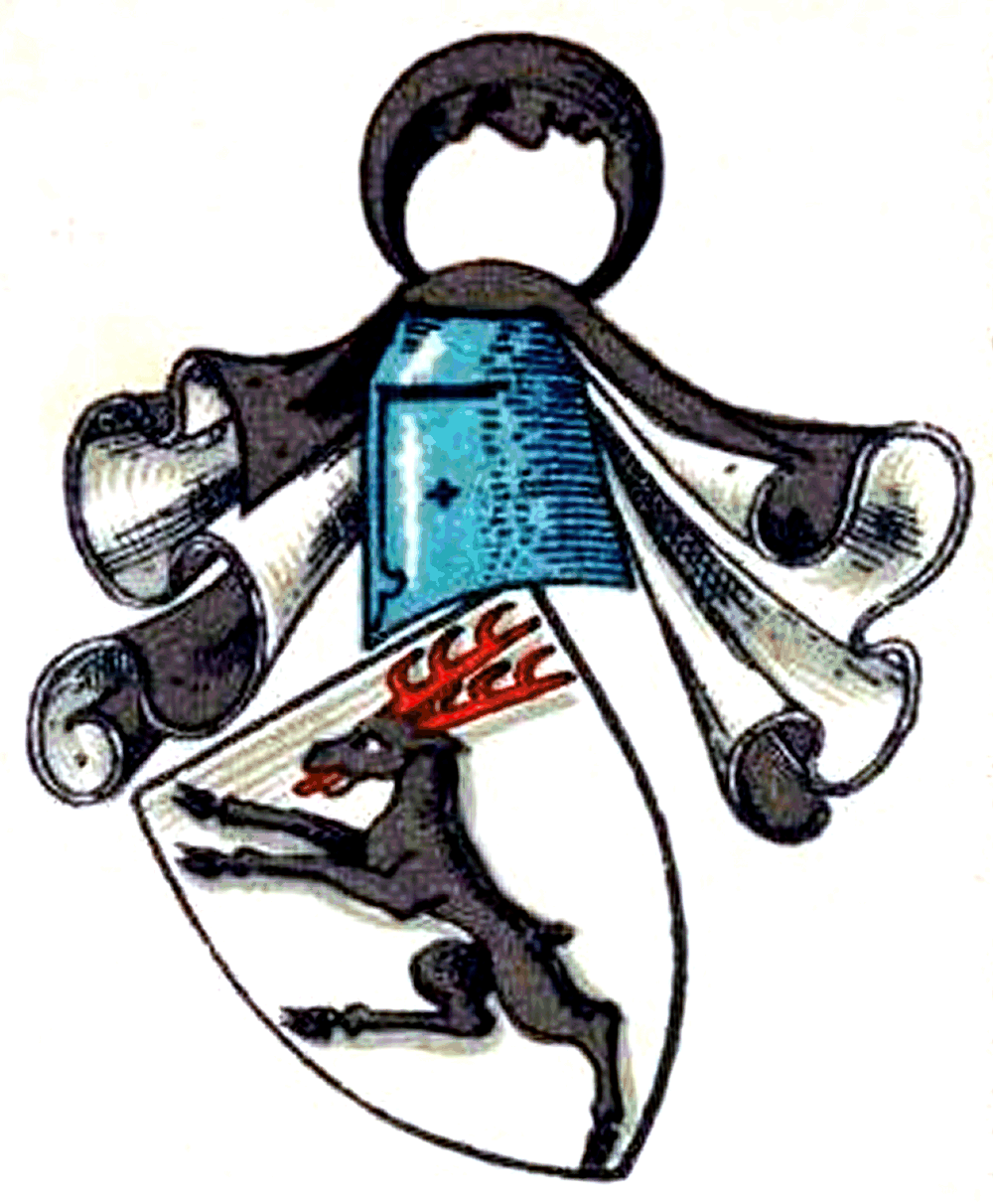
Coat of arms of the Brauchitsch family

The Brauchitsch family is the name of an old Prussian noble family, first documented in the 13th century at the Silesian village of Brauchitschdorf, nowadays Chrustenik. Members of the family have been noted as statesmen and high military officers in Germany.

== Notable members ==
- Ludwig von Brauchitsch (1757–1827) general.
- Bernard von Brauchitsch (1833–1910) general.
- Charlotte von Brauchitsch (née Gordon) (1844–1906) heiress.
- Adolf von Brauchitsch (1876–1935) general.
- Margarete von Brauchitsch (1879–1939), designer.
- Walther von Brauchitsch (1881–1948), field marshal.
- Georg von Brauchitsch (1885–1940), archeologist.
- Manfred von Brauchitsch (1905–2003), auto-racing driver.
- Bernd von Brauchitsch (1911–1974) adjutant to Göring and, after the war, a manager in steel business.
- Eberhard von Brauchitsch (1926–2010), industrial manager.
- Boris von Brauchitsch (born 1963), author, curator and photographer.
