= Walther von Brauchitsch =

German Commander-in-Chief during World War II (1881–1948)

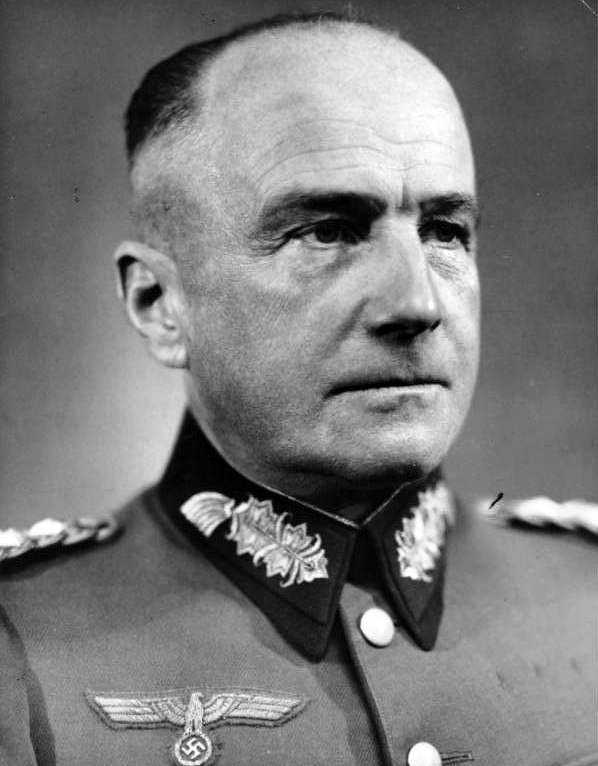
- Brauchitsch in 1939

Chief of the Army High Command
- In office 4 February 1938 – 19 December 1941
- Führer: Adolf Hitler
- Preceded by: Werner von Fritsch
- Succeeded by: Adolf Hitler

Personal details
- Born: Walther Heinrich Alfred Hermann von Brauchitsch; 4 October 1881 Berlin, Prussia, Germany
- Died: 18 October 1948 (aged 67) Hamburg, British-occupied Germany
- Resting place: Salzgitter
- Spouses: Elizabeth von Karstedt (m. 1910; div. 1938) Charlotte Rueffer (m. 1938)
- Children: 3
- Relatives: Adolf von Brauchitsch (brother)

Military service
- Allegiance: Germany
- Branch/service: Imperial German Army; Reichswehr; German Army
- Years of service: 1900–1941
- Rank: Generalfeldmarschall
- Battles/wars: World War I; Battle of Armentières; Battle of Verdun; Second Battle of the Aisne; German Spring Offensive; Third Battle of the Aisne; Meuse-Argonne Offensive; World War II; Invasion of Poland; Battle of France; Balkan campaign; Operation Barbarossa
- Awards: Knight's Cross of the Iron Cross

Walther Heinrich Alfred Hermann von Brauchitsch (4 October 1881 – 18 October 1948) was a German Generalfeldmarschall (Field Marshal) and Commander-in-Chief (Oberbefehlshaber) of the German Army during the first two years of World War II. Born into an aristocratic military family, he entered army service in 1901. During World War I, he served with distinction on the corps-level and division-level staff on the Western Front.

After the 1933 Nazi seizure of power, Walther von Brauchitsch was put in charge of Wehrkreis I, the military district for East Prussia. During this period, he borrowed immense sums of money from Adolf Hitler and ultimately became dependent on his financial help. By 4 February 1938, Brauchitsch was named Commander-in-Chief of the German Army. In this capacity, he oversaw the successful German invasions of Poland, Western Europe, Yugoslavia, and Greece. For his part in the Battle of France, he became one of twelve generals promoted to field marshal.

On 22 June 1941, Field Marshal Brauchitsch oversaw the launch of Operation Barbarossa, Nazi Germany's invasion of the Soviet Union. Despite initially presiding over a series of military victories, his forces were ultimately thrown back by a massive Soviet counteroffensive in December at the Battle of Moscow, thereby causing Barbarossa to end in failure. Enraged by this defeat, Hitler fired Brauchitsch from his command of the German Army. Thereafter, he spent the rest of the war in enforced retirement. Following the war's end, Brauchitsch was arrested on charges of war crimes, but he died of pneumonia in 1948 before he could be prosecuted.

== Early life ==
Brauchitsch was born in Berlin on 4 October 1881 as the sixth child of Bernhard von Brauchitsch, a cavalry general, and his wife, Charlotte Bertha von Gordon. The Brauchitsch family had a long tradition of military service, and like his forefathers, Brauchitsch was raised in the tradition of the Prussian officer corps. His family moved in the leading social circles of Berlin's high society, and his family name and father's military rank put him on equal footing with any officer or official. In his teens, Brauchitsch was interested in politics and was fascinated by art. To help him pursue these interests, his father enrolled him at Französisches Gymnasium Berlin rather than a military academy.

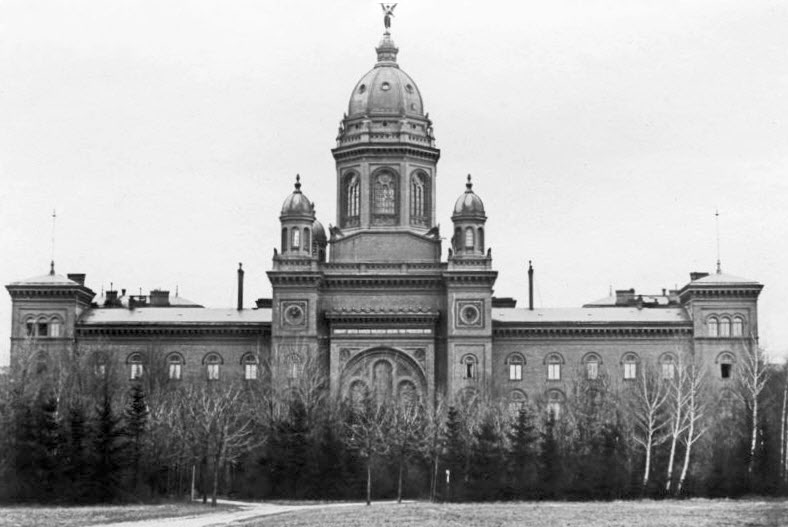
Hauptkadettenanstalt Groß Lichterfelde, the military academy Brauchitsch attended

In 1895 Brauchitsch joined the military academy in Potsdam. He later transferred to the Hauptkadettenanstalt Groß Lichterfelde, where in his final year he belonged to the top class for gifted students and was chosen, like his brother Adolf five years before, as a page by Empress Augusta Victoria. During his time serving the empress at court, he learned manners and bearing that were noted for the rest of his life.

Upon graduation in 1900 he received his commission as a lieutenant in an infantry regiment. Alternative sources suggest that upon graduation he became a lieutenant in the Royal Elizabeth Guard Grenadiers but got himself transferred from this "socialite outfit" to the Third Field Artillery Regiment. A medical condition made him unfit for service in the infantry, so he was transferred to an artillery regiment. He was put in charge of training recruits in riding and driving. He then joined the General Staff office in Berlin, where he was promoted to first lieutenant in 1909.

== World War I ==
At the outbreak of World War I in August 1914, Brauchitsch had reached the rank of captain. He was appointed staff officer to the XVI Army Corps, stationed near Metz. During World War I, he served with the 34th Infantry Division and Guards Reserve Corps. Between 1914 and 1916, he took part in the Battle of Verdun and Battle of the Argonne Forest. In the remaining two years of the conflict, Brauchitsch took part in the Third Battle of the Aisne, the Aisne-Marne offensive, the Second Battle of the Aisne, the Battle of Armentières, and the Battle of Flanders. Brauchitsch was awarded the Iron Cross 1st Class and the House Order of Hohenzollern, and ended the war with the rank of major.

== Weimar Republic ==
In 1918, together with thousands of other officers, he was dismissed to the Reserve Corps. But the next year he was back as a major. The German military underwent a forced reduction in 1919 to comply with the Treaty of Versailles, but Brauchitsch managed to remain in service. He remained with the General Staff, where he had no opportunity to use his knowledge of artillery. Eventually, in 1920, he was permitted to transfer to the staff of the 2nd Artillery Regiment. The following year, he worked in the Ministry of the Reichswehr, in the Artillery Department.

Brauchitsch's assignment in the Artillery Department was to reorganize artillery formations and implement lessons learned in the closing months of the war. He added ideas of his own, including modifying the classification system for light, medium, and heavy artillery. Heavy artillery, formerly known as "corps artillery", now became "reinforcement artillery". He also added emphasis on the combination and cooperation between artillery and infantry.

After three years in the Artillery Department, he was promoted to lieutenant colonel in 1925. As of 1 November 1927, Brauchitsch was appointed Chief of Staff of the 6th Infantry Division in Münster, Westphalia, one of the strongest garrisons in the west of Germany. In the last years of the Weimar Republic, he took over the Army Training Department and became a colonel (promoted in 1928). In October 1931, Brauchitsch received his major general promotion.

== Nazi Germany ==
In 1933, Adolf Hitler and the Nazi Party came to power and began to expand the military, in order to realize Hitler's military ambitions. On 1 February 1933, Brauchitsch was named commander of the East Prussian military district (Wehrkreis I) and chief of the 1st Division in Königsberg. As a consequence of the German re-armament the command position Befehlshaber im Wehrkreis I (Commander of the 1st military district) was expanded. Brauchitsch was promoted to lieutenant general in October 1933. The staff of the 1st Division formed the staff of the 1st Army Corps and Brauchitsch was appointed its first commanding general on 21 June 1935.

Although Brauchitsch felt at home in Prussia, he had a clash with Erich Koch, the local Gauleiter (party head and de facto head of civil administration of the province). Koch was known as something of a crook who greatly enjoyed the power he possessed, and who would bring violence to his enemies. As neither Koch nor Brauchitsch wanted to lose their jobs in the region, the two attempted to keep their feud unofficial. As a result, Berlin hardly learned of their dispute.

A dispute emerged a few years later when Brauchitsch learned that Reichsführer-SS Heinrich Himmler planned to replace the army guards in East Prussia with SS men, with the purpose of persecuting Jews, Protestant and Catholic churches in the district. Even though Brauchitsch managed to prevent the SS replacement of the army troops in the region, Himmler categorized him as "a junker", and informed Hitler of the disagreement. Brauchitsch claimed he had done his duty, saying laconically, "Civilians are not allowed to enter that area."

In 1936, General Brauchitsch obtained the rank of general of artillery. Later, when Colonel General Werner von Fritsch, was accused of homosexuality in January 1938, Brauchitsch emerged as a possible candidate to replace him as Commander-in-Chief of the Army. However, his promotion was threatened by a potential scandal involving his marriage. For the sake of living openly with his mistress, Brauchitsch was actively seeking a divorce but his current wife refused to grant him one unless she received a sizable lump-sum payout. Ultimately, this issue was resolved when the Nazis paid his spouse roughly 80,000-250,000 Reichsmarcks, thereby securing the general's divorce. By 4 February 1938, the Nazi leadership authorized Brauchitsch to assume command of the Army in exchange for his commitment to bring its membership firmly under their control.. At the time of this promotion, Brauchitsch was also granted cabinet-level rank and authority, though not the formal title of Reichsminister.

Brauchitsch (center) posing for a photo with Francoist generals from Spain in June 1939.

Upon being appointed commander-in-chief of the German Army, Brauchitsch launched a pervasive shake-up of its ranks, effectively robbing the venerable institution of its autonomy. In order to make way for the advancement of known pro-Nazi officers, some 14 senior generals were forced into retirement. Likewise, 44 other officers holding influential positions within the army leadership were transferred out, including the head of the Army Personnel Office, Lt. Gen. Viktor von Schwedler, who was in turn replaced by Col. Bodewin Keitel, the brother of Hitler's compliant OKW chief. The Army's independence was eroded even further as Brauchitsch became increasingly reliant on Hitler for financial help.

Like Colonel General Ludwig Beck, Brauchitsch opposed Hitler's annexation of Austria and intervention in Czechoslovakia. However, he did not resist Hitler's plans for war, preferring to not get involved in politics. In April 1939, Brauchitsch and Colonel-General Wilhelm Keitel, were awarded the Golden Party Badge by Hitler in commemoration of their role in the occupation of Czechoslovakia.

In the final months before World War II, Brauchitsch focused on Italy's potential to aid the Nazi military cause. In May 1939 he inspected the Italian military installations in Libya, and La Spezia, to affirm Italo-German alliance. However, this turned out not to be an easy task, as the Italian leader Benito Mussolini expected economic support from the Reich in return for his military collaboration. Fritsch had already told Brauchitsch that the Italian military was in "extremely poor fighting shape". Joachim von Ribbentrop, Germany's Foreign Minister and the main architect of the Axis alliance, constantly interfered with Brauchitsch's efforts, as he wanted to see his work consolidated at all costs.

== World War II ==
Brauchitsch reviews plans for invading Poland alongside General Franz Halder (left) in 1939.

During the invasion of Poland, Brauchitsch oversaw most plans. The Polish campaign was often cited as the first example of "blitzkrieg", but blitzkrieg was not a theory or an official doctrine. The campaign did not resemble the popular perception of what became known as blitzkrieg. The Panzer divisions were spread thinly among the infantry and were not granted operational independence or grouped en masse, as they would be in the 1940 invasion of Western Europe. The operative method of the Wehrmacht in Poland followed the more traditional Vernichtungsgedanke (concept of annihilation). What is commonly referred to as blitzkrieg did not develop until after the campaign in the west in June 1940. It was not the cause but rather the consequence of victory. Brauchitsch himself had to be convinced that armour could act independently at the operational level, before the campaign.

Brauchitsch supported harsh measures against the Polish population, which he claimed were needed for securing German Lebensraum ("living space"). He had a central role in the death sentences for Polish prisoners taken in the defence of the Polish Post Office in Danzig, rejecting the clemency appeal.

=== Invasion of Western Europe and the Balkans ===
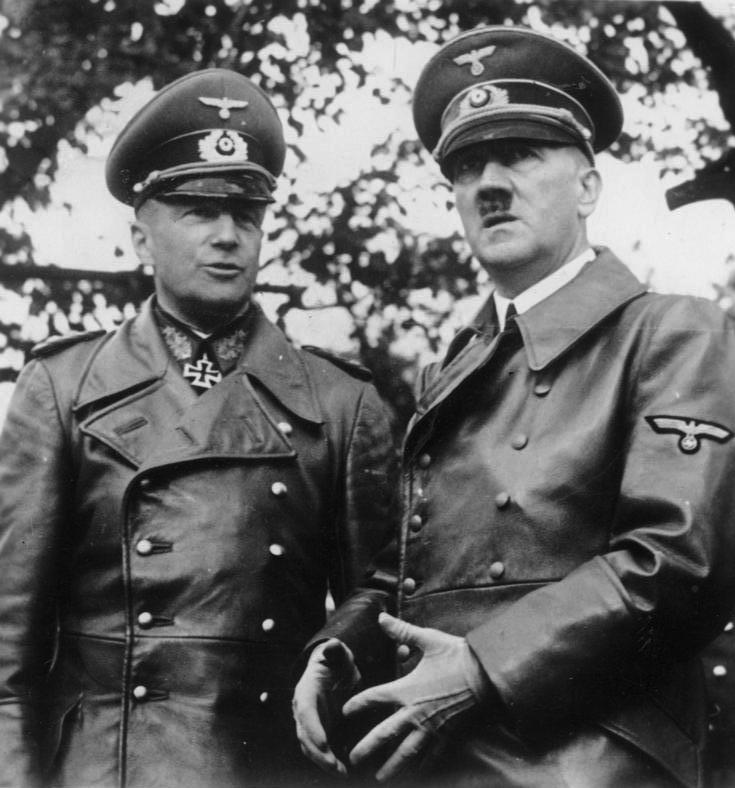
Brauchitsch with Hitler in Warsaw, October 1939

By early November 1939, Brauchitsch and Colonel General Franz Halder, the Chief of the Army General Staff, began to consider overthrowing Hitler, who had fixed 12 November 1939 as the "X-day" for the invasion of France. Both officers believed that the invasion was doomed to fail.

On 5 November 1939, the Army General Staff prepared a special memorandum purporting to recommend against launching an attack on the Western powers that year. Brauchitsch reluctantly agreed to read the document to Hitler and did so in a meeting on 5 November. Brauchitsch attempted to talk Hitler into putting off X-day by saying that morale in the German Army was worse than in 1918. Brauchitsch went on to complain: "The aggressive spirit of the German infantry is sadly below the standard of the First World War ... [there have been] certain symptoms of insubordination similar to those of 1917–18." Hitler flew into a rage, accusing the General Staff and Brauchitsch personally of disloyalty, cowardice, sabotage, and defeatism. He returned to the army headquarters at Zossen, where he "arrived in such poor shape that at first he could only give a somewhat incoherent account of the proceedings."

After Brauchitsch's meeting with Hitler in November 1939, both he and Halder told Carl Friedrich Goerdeler, a key leader of the anti-Nazi movement, that overthrowing Hitler was simply something that they could not do and that he should find other officers to take part in the plot. Hitler called a meeting of the General Staff, where he declared that he would smash the West within a year. He also vowed to "destroy the spirit of Zossen", a threat that panicked Halder to such an extent that he forced the conspirators to abort their second planned coup attempt. On 7 November, following heavy snowstorms, Hitler put off X-Day until further notice, which removed Brauchitsch and Halder's primary motivation for the plot.

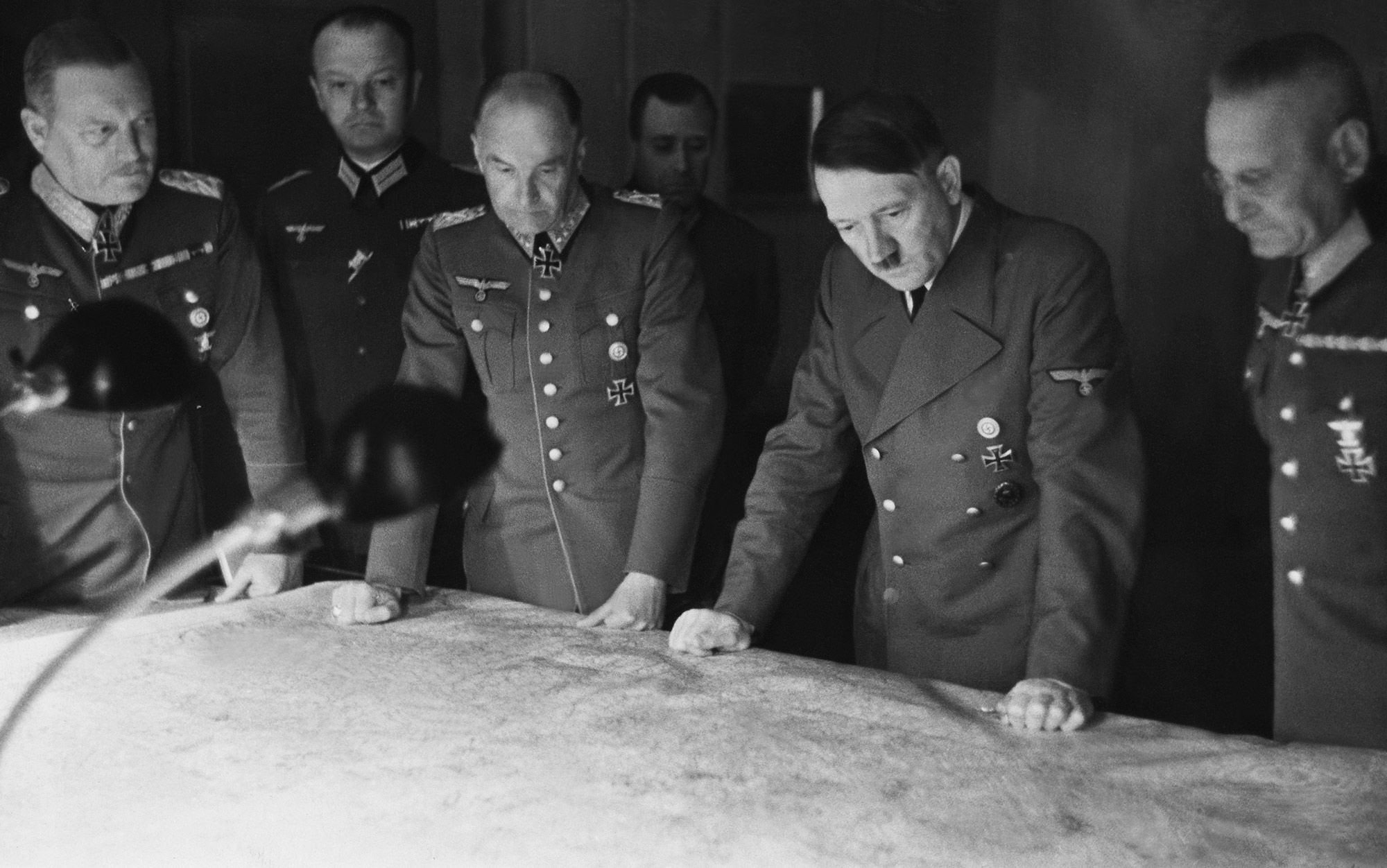
Brauchistch (third from left) attending a military briefing with Hitler and the German high command (c. 1940).

While preparations were underway for the Battle of France, General Erich von Manstein, then serving as chief of staff of Army Group A, produced his famous Sichelschnitt ("sickle cut") plan, only to have it rejected by both Brauchitsch and Halder. When Manstein demanded that Sichelschnitt be presented to OKH, Halder suggested transferring Manstein somewhere to the east, excluding him from the planning process. Brauchitsch agreed and transferred him to Silesia. However, Hitler invited a group of officers to lunch, and Manstein was among them. He managed to present his plan directly to Hitler. The following day, Hitler ordered Brauchitsch to accept Manstein's plan, which the Führer presented as his own. Despite his original scepticism, Brauchitsch eventually saw the plan's potential and felt that the army had a real chance of success in France.

After the surprisingly swift fall of France, Brauchitsch was promoted to field marshal in July 1940, during the 1940 Field Marshal Ceremony. After France had been occupied and divided, he and the rest of the high command were looking forward to a similarly easy and swift campaign against Great Britain, now seriously weakened by the French campaign. He was confident that Britain would be easily defeated: "We consider the victory already won. England remains secure, but only so long as we choose." Had Operation Sealion, the plan for the invasion of Britain, succeeded, Hitler intended to place Brauchitsch in charge of the new conquest. As the Luftwaffe could not gain the requisite air superiority, the Battle of Britain was lost and so the plan was shelved and eventually cancelled.

In the swift invasion and occupation of Yugoslavia and Greece in early April 1941, the Germans committed some 337,000 men, 2,000 mortars, 1,500 artillery pieces, 1,100 anti-tank guns, 875 tanks and 740 other armoured fighting vehicles, all of which were under the overall command of Brauchitsch. By the end of the month, all of Yugoslavia and Greece were in German hands.

=== Operation Barbarossa ===
After being informed by Hitler in July 1940 of his intention to invade the Soviet Union, Field Marshal Brauchitsch ordered General Halder to prepare a plan for such an operation. By 18 December 1940, plans for Operation Barbarossa were formalized in Führer Directive No. 21, specifying that "the mass of the [Soviet] Army stationed in western Russia [was] to be destroyed" before commencing "further offensive operations with the objective of occupying...Moscow." Later, on 24 May 1941, the Oberkommando der Wehrmacht (OKW) issued a decree authorizing officers to order collective reprisals for unidentified attacks on their men and abstain from prosecuting felonies committed against civilians by troops in the coming campaign. Similarly, Guidelines for the Behavior of the Troops in Russia stipulated that "[t]his battle demands ruthless and energetic measures against Bolshevik agitators, guerillas, saboteurs, Jews, and complete elimination of any active or passive resistance." Brauchitsch personally ordered all army personnel to cease criticism of the Nazis' racist policies, as harsh measures were needed for the "forthcoming battle of destiny of the German people".

From Barbarossa's commencement in June 1941, the forces under Brauchitsch's command met with considerable military success. On 28 June 1941, Army Group Center completed a pincer movement at Minsk, resulting in the capture of 300,000 Soviet soldiers as well as the destruction of 3,300 tanks and 1,800 artillery guns. Later at the Battle of Kiev, Army Group South destroyed 5 Soviet armies in what remains the largest encirclement in military history. During the aforementioned battle, Brauchitsch issued a proclamation to the Ukrainian people promising that Hitler would make Ukraine a free state if they joined Germany in its fight against the Red Army. This led many thousands of Ukrainians to join German forces in late 1941 following Kiev's capture. As September drew to a close, total Soviet losses had risen to 2,500,000 men; 22,000 artillery guns; 18,000 tanks and 14,000 aircraft. By the end of November 1941, the German Army had made territorial gains up to 600 miles within the Soviet Union.

Brauchitsch also oversaw the perpetration of numerous war crimes during Barbarossa. Over the course of the invasion, the German Army summarily executed at least half a million Soviet prisoners-of-war and aided SS death squads in the mass killing of around 1 million Jews. A further 2 million Soviet soldiers died of starvation while being held in captivity.

When the Battle of Moscow got underway in October 1941, Brauchitsch's health began to fail. Even so, he continued his work, as he was determined to take Moscow before the start of winter. The army's failure to take Moscow earned him Hitler's enmity. Things worsened for him, as he suffered a heart attack in November. He was also informed that he had a malignant cardiac disease that was most likely incurable.

=== Dismissal ===
In the aftermath of the failed offensive at Moscow, Brauchitsch was dismissed as Commander-in-Chief of the German Army on 19 December and transferred to the Führerreserve (officers reserve), where he remained without assignment until the end of the war; he never saw Hitler again. He spent the last three years of the war living at his castle-like hunting lodge "Dreiröhren" in the Brdy mountains southwest of Prague. One of his few public comments after retirement was a statement condemning the 20 July plot against Hitler for which he denounced several former colleagues. Later, he excused himself to Halder, claiming he had been forced to do so to save a relative's life.

== Postwar confinement and death ==
In August 1945, Brauchitsch was arrested at his estate and imprisoned by the British at Island Farm in South Wales and later transferred to a British military hospital in Münsterlager. He was held until August 1948, when the British government announced that he would be brought to trial before a British military tribunal in the British occupation zone, most likely in Hamburg. However, he died, aged 67, on 18 October 1948 of bronchial pneumonia in a British-controlled military hospital in Hamburg before facing trial for conspiracy and crimes against humanity.

== Personal life ==
In 1910, Brauchitsch married his first wife, Elizabeth von Karstedt, a wealthy heiress to 120,000 hectares (300,000 acres) in Brandenburg. The couple had a daughter and two sons, including Bernd von Brauchitsch, who later served in the Luftwaffe during World War II as Hermann Göring's adjutant. They were divorced in 1938 after 28 years of marriage, as Brauchitsch had developed another romantic interest.

In 1925, Brauchitsch met Charlotte Rueffer, the daughter of a Silesian judge. He wanted a divorce, but his wife refused. Rueffer later married a bank director named Schmidt, who drowned in his bath during a visit to Berlin. When Brauchitsch returned from East Prussia in 1937, the pair resumed their affair. They married immediately after Brauchitsch had divorced Karstedt.

Brauchitsch was the uncle of Manfred von Brauchitsch, a 1930s Mercedes-Benz "Silver Arrow" Grand Prix driver, and also Hans Bernd von Haeften and Werner von Haeften, who were members of the German resistance against Hitler.

== Assessment ==
According to historian William E. Hart, Brauchitsch was the only German general who dared to tell Hitler, openly and in front of others, that the days when a mere corporal could fancy himself as Napoleon were over. Hitler frequently compared himself to the French Emperor, a habit that frustrated many of his generals. Hart describes Brauchitsch as a man who was "agile, nervous, upright, quick in both speech and action. The severity of his Napoleonic nose and thin lips was softened by his very expressive brown eyes."

Historian Helmut Krausnick characterizes Brauchitsch as "an outstanding professional who lived up to the traditions of his profession, but especially lacked the strength of personality to deal with Hitler". Historian Ian Kershaw describes him less sympathetically as a "spineless individual, who was frightened by Hitler. He was no person to lead any type of front or revolt."

== In popular culture ==
In 1983 American war drama television miniseries The Winds of War (miniseries), Wolfgang Preiss starred as Field Marshal Walter von Brauchitsch.

== Awards ==
- Iron Cross (1914) 2nd Class (13 September 1914) & 1st Class (1 October 1915)
- Württemberg Friedrich Order with Swords (7 May 1915)
- Knight's Cross of the House Order of Hohenzollern with Swords (15 May 1917)
- Saxe-Meiningen Honour Cross for War Merit (2 January 1918)
- Service Award for 25 service years (17 April 1920)
- The Honour Cross of the World War 1914/1918 (18 December 1934)
- Wehrmacht Long Service Award 1st Class (2 October 1936)
- Order of Merit of the Kingdom of Hungary 1st Class (20 August 1938)
- Star of the German Red Cross Decoration (5 September 1938)
- Grand Cross of the Royal Italian Order of Saints Maurice and Lazarus (3 January 1939)
- Grand Cross of the Order of the White Rose of Finland (10 March 1939)
- Golden Party Badge (20 April 1939).
- Order of the Yugoslav Crown 1st Class (1 June 1939)
- Sudetenland Medal with Clasp (7 June 1939)
- Clasp to the Iron Cross (1939) 2nd Class (30 September 1939) & 1st Class (30 September 1939)
- Knights Cross of the Iron Cross (30 September 1939) as Colonel General and Commander-in-Chief of the Army
- Spanish Military Merit Cross 1st Class (1939)
- Spanish Imperial Order of the Yoke and Arrows, Grand Cross in 1940
- Grand Cross of the Royal Bulgarian Order of St Alexander with Swords (15 May 1941)
- Grand Cross of the Royal Hungarian Order of Merit with Swords (31 May 1941)
- Grand Cross of the Romanian Order of Michael the Brave (11 October 1941)
- Slovak War Victory Cross 1st Class (20 October 1941)
- Grand Cross of the Finnish Order of the Cross of Liberty (19 July 1942)
- Japanese Order of the Rising Sun 1st Class (26 September 1942)

== Dates of rank ==
- Leutnant (Second Lieutenant) – 22 March 1900
- Oberleutnant (First Lieutenant) – 18 October 1909
- Hauptmann (Captain) – 18 December 1913
- Major (Major) – 15 July 1918
- Oberstleutnant (Lieutenant Colonel) – 1 June 1923
- Oberst (Colonel) – 1 April 1928
- Generalmajor (Major General) – 1 October 1931
- Generalleutnant (Lieutenant General) – 1 October 1933
- General der Artillerie (General of Artillery) –1 October 1935
- Generaloberst (Colonel General) – 4 February 1938
- Generalfeldmarschall (Field Marshal) – 19 July 1940

== See also ==
- Corruption within the Wehrmacht

Military offices
Preceded by Generaloberst Werner von Blomberg	Commander of Wehrkreis I 1 February 1933 – 1 April 1937	Succeeded by General der Artillerie Georg von Küchler
Preceded by —	I. Armeekorps; 21 June 1935 – 1 April 1937	Succeeded by General der Artillerie Georg von Küchler
Preceded by Generaloberst Werner von Fritsch	Commander-in-Chief of the German Army; 4 February 1938 – 19 December 1941	Succeeded by Führer und Reichskanzler Adolf Hitler
