= Benjamin Schmolck =

German writer of hymns

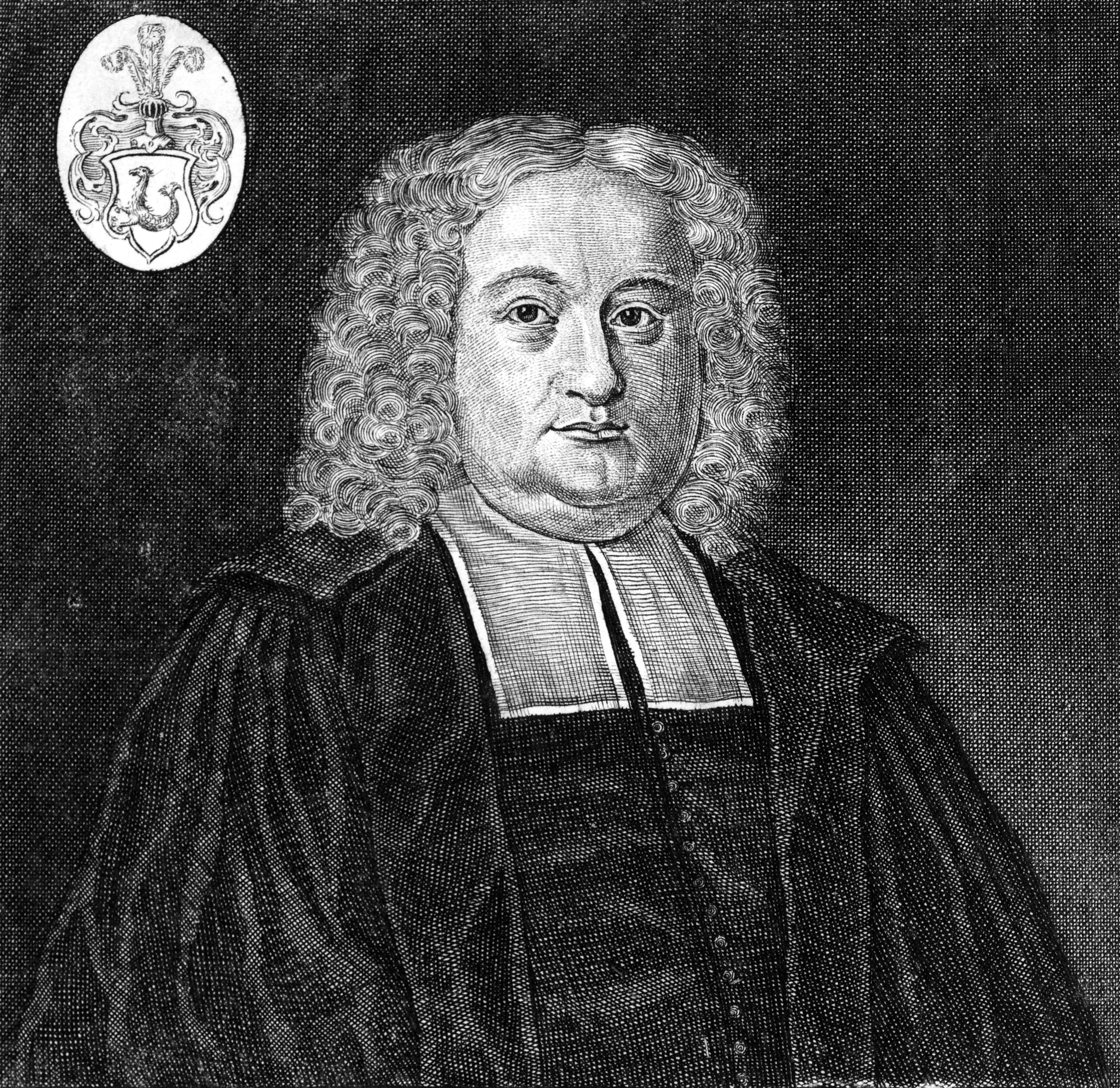
Benjamin Schmolck.

Benjamin Schmolck (21 December 1672 – 12 February 1737) was a German Lutheran writer of hymns.

He was born a pastor's son in Brauchitschdorf (Chróstnik), Silesia. After attending the gymnasium in Liegnitz (Legnica), he studied theology at the University of Leipzig from 1693 to 1697. In 1702 he was ordained as a deacon at the Protestant Church of Peace and in 1714 as the pastor of the Church of the Holy Trinity in Schweidnitz (Świdnica), where he stayed for the rest of his life. Influenced by the pietism movement he became the most popular hymn writer of his day. His compositions include My Jesus as Thou Wilt and A faithful friend is wandering yonder. One of his pupils was the poet Johann Christian Günther.

Schmolck died in Schweidnitz.
