= Goebbels Diaries =

Collection of writings by Joseph Goebbels

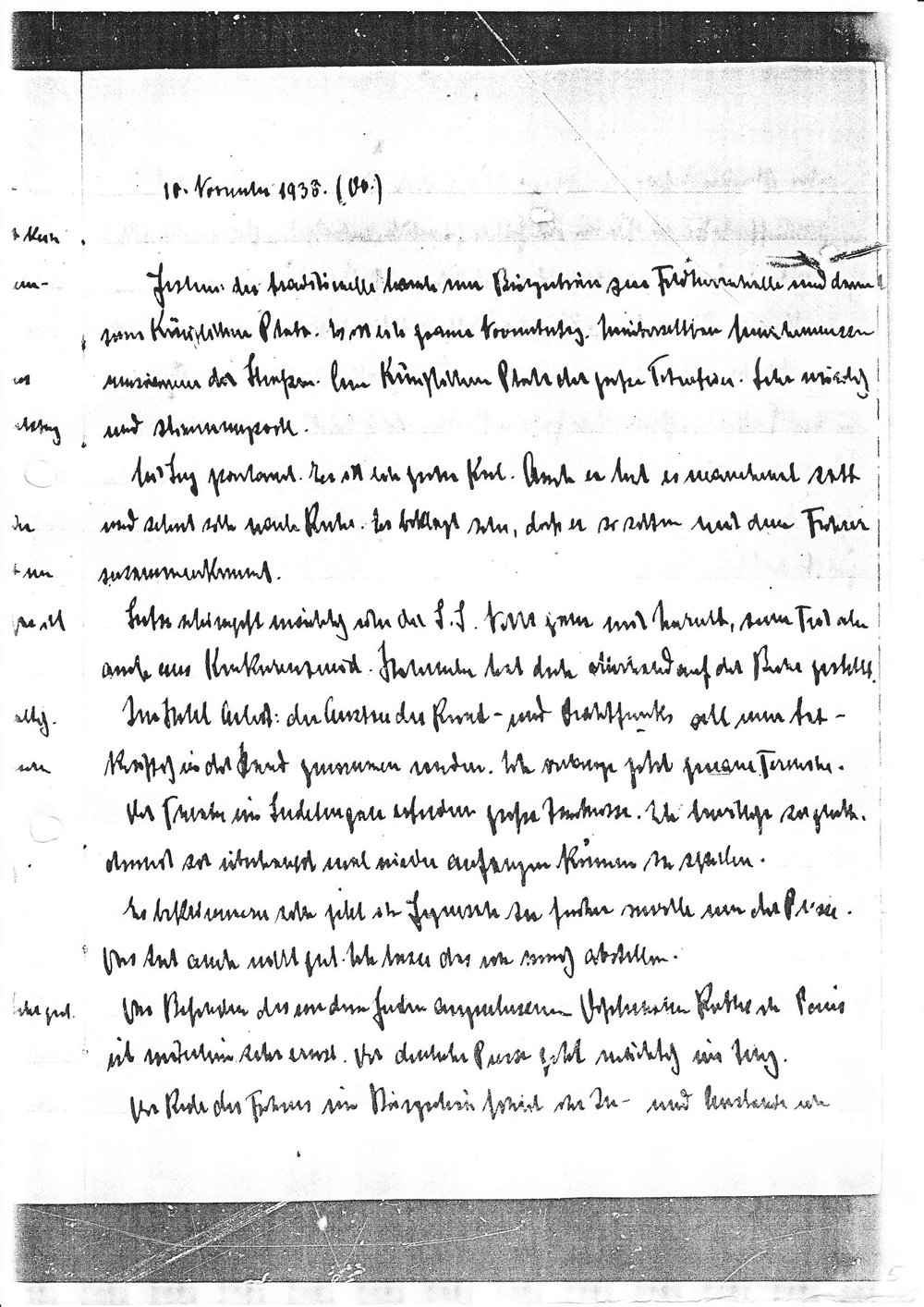
- Author: Joseph Goebbels
- Genre: Diary
- Publisher: K. G. Saur Verlag
- Publication date: 1993-2008
- Publication place: Germany

The Goebbels Diaries are a collection of writings by Joseph Goebbels, a leading member of the Nazi Party and the Reich Minister of Public Enlightenment and Propaganda in Adolf Hitler's government from 1933 to 1945. Portions of the diaries were unpublished until the 2000s. They have been published in full in German, and are available in part in English translation. They are a major source for the inner history of the Nazi Party and of its twelve years in power in Germany. The British historian Ian Kershaw wrote in the preface to his biography of Hitler: "For all the caution which must naturally be attached to Goebbels's regularly reported remarks by Hitler ... the immediacy as well as the frequency of the comments makes them a vitally important source of insight into Hitler's thinking and action."

== History ==
Goebbels began to keep a diary in October 1923, shortly before his 26th birthday, while unemployed and living in his parents' home at Rheydt in the Lower Rhine region. He had been given a diary as a present by Else Janke, a young woman (of part-Jewish background) with whom he had a turbulent and eventually unsuccessful relationship, and most of his early entries were about her. His biographer Toby Thacker writes: "Writing a diary quickly became a kind of therapy for this troubled young man, and several historians have commented on how extraordinarily candid and revealing Goebbels was, particularly in his early years as a diarist." From 1923 onwards he wrote in his diary almost daily.

According to biographer Peter Longerich, Goebbels' diary entries from late 1923 to early 1924 reflected the writings of a man who was isolated, preoccupied by "religious-philosophical" issues, and lacked a sense of direction. Diary entries of mid-December 1923 forward show Goebbels was moving towards the völkisch nationalist movement. Goebbels first took an interest in Adolf Hitler and Nazism in March 1924. In February 1924, Hitler's trial for treason had begun in the wake of his failed attempt to seize power in Munich, Bavaria, during 8–9 November 1923 (this failed coup became known as the Beer Hall Putsch). The trial garnered Hitler much press and gave him a platform for propaganda. After Goebbels first met Hitler in July 1925, however, the Nazi leader increasingly became the central figure in the diary. By July 1926 Goebbels was so enraptured by Hitler speaking on "racial issues", that he wrote: "It is impossible to reproduce what [Hitler] said. It must be experienced. He is a genius. The natural, creative instrument of a fate determined by God. I am deeply moved."

Hitler became Chancellor in January 1933 and appointed Goebbels Propaganda Minister. Goebbels then published an edited version of his diaries for the period of Hitler's rise to power in book form, under the title Vom Kaiserhof zur Reichskanzlei: Eine historische Darstellung in Tagebuchblättern (From the Kaiserhof to the Reich Chancellery: a Historical Diary). The Kaiserhof was a Berlin hotel where Hitler stayed before he came to power. Goebbels's book was later published in English as My Part in Germany's Fight. Although this book was propagandist in intent, it provides insight into the mentality of the Nazi leadership at the time of their accession to power.

By July 1941 the diaries had grown to fill twenty thick volumes, and Goebbels realised that they were too valuable a resource to risk their destruction in an air raid. He therefore moved them from his study in his Berlin home to the underground vaults of the Reichsbank in central Berlin. From this time onwards, he no longer wrote the diaries by hand. Instead he dictated them to a stenographer, who later typed up corrected versions. He began each day's entry with a resume of the day's military and political news. Thacker notes: "Goebbels was already aware that his diary constituted a remarkable historical document, and entertained fond hopes of reworking it at some future stage for further publication, devoting hours to each day's entry." The involvement of a stenographer, however, meant that the diaries were no longer entirely secret, and they became less frank about personal matters.

By November 1944 it was evident to Goebbels that Germany was going to lose the war. He wrote in his diary: "How distant and alien indeed this beautiful world appears. Inwardly I have already taken leave of it." Realising that he was unlikely to survive the fall of the Third Reich, he gave orders that his diaries were to be copied for safekeeping, using the new technique of microfilm. A special darkroom was created in Goebbels's apartment in central Berlin, and Goebbels's stenographer, Richard Otte, supervised the work.

The last preserved entry dates to 10 April 1945 and contains only a report on the military situation, on which Goebbels did not comment. The boxes of glass plates containing the microfilmed diaries were sent in April 1945 to Potsdam just west of Berlin, where they were buried. The original handwritten and typed diaries were packed and stored in the Reich Chancellery. Some of these survived, and formed the basis for the publication of sections of the diaries (mainly from the war years) after the war. The boxes of glass plates at Potsdam were discovered by the Soviets and shipped to Moscow, where they sat unopened until they were discovered by Elke Fröhlich in March 1992. Only then did the publication of the full diaries become possible.

== Publications ==
=== In German ===
A 29-volume edition, spanning the years 1923–1945, was edited by Elke Fröhlich and others. It is said to be 98% complete. Publication began in 1993, with the last volume appearing in 2008. Die Tagebücher von Joseph Goebbels was published on behalf of the Institut für Zeitgeschichte and with the support of the National Archives Service of Russia by K. G. Saur Verlag in Munich. Full information follows:

- Die Tagebücher von Joseph Goebbels, Teil I Aufzeichnungen 1923–1941 [The Diaries of Joseph Goebbels, Part I: Notations, 1923–1941] (ISBN 3-598-23730-8)

Volume	Entry dates	Editor(s)	Year published
1/I	October 1923 – November 1925	Elke Fröhlich	2004
1/II	December 1925 – May 1928	Elke Fröhlich	2005
1/III	June 1928 – November 1929	Anne Munding	2004
2/I	December 1929 – May 1931	Anne Munding	2005
2/II	June 1931 – September 1932	Angela Hermann	2004
2/III	October 1932 – March 1934	Angela Hermann	2006
3/I	April 1934 – February 1936	Angela Hermann; Hartmut Mehringer; Anne Munding; Jana Richter	2005
3/II	March 1936 – February 1937	Jana Richter	2001
4	March – November 1937	Elke Fröhlich	2000
5	December 1937 – July 1938	Elke Fröhlich	2000
6	August 1938 – June 1939	Jana Richter	1998
7	July 1939 – March 1940	Elke Fröhlich	1998
8	April – November 1940	Jana Richter	1997
9	December 1940 – July 1941	Elke Fröhlich	1997

- Die Tagebücher von Joseph Goebbels, Teil II Diktate 1941–1945 [The Diaries of Joseph Goebbels, Part II: Dictations, 1941–1945] (ISBN 3-598-21920-2):

Volume	Entry dates	Editor(s)	Year published
1	July – September 1941	Elke Fröhlich	1996
2	October – December 1941	Elke Fröhlich	1996
3	January – March 1942	Elke Fröhlich	1995
4	April – June 1942	Elke Fröhlich	1995
5	July – September 1942	Angela Stüber	1995
6	October – December 1942	Hartmut Mehringer	1996
7	January – March 1943	Elke Fröhlich	1993
8	April – June 1943	Hartmut Mehringer	1993
9	July – September 1943	Manfred Kittel	1993
10	October – December 1943	Volker Dahm	1994
11	January – March 1944	Dieter Marc Schneider	1994
12	April – June 1944	Hartmut Mehringer	1995
13	July – September 1944	Jana Richter	1995
14	October – December 1944	Jana Richter; Hermann Graml	1996
15	January – April 1945	Maximilian Gschaid	1995

- Die Tagebücher von Joseph Goebbels, Teil III Register 1923–1945 [The Diaries of Joseph Goebbels, Part III: Register, 1923–1945]:

Contents	Editor(s)	Year published
Geographical register. Register of persons	Angela Hermann	2007
Introduction by Elke Fröhlich to the complete work. Subject index. 2 volumes.	Florian Dierl, Ute Keck, Benjamin Obermüller, Annika Sommersberg and Ulla-Britta Vollhardt. Coordinated and brought together by Ulla-Britta Vollhardt. Composed by Angela Hermann.	2008

- Astrid M. Eckert, Stefan Martens, "Glasplatten im märkischen Sand: Ein Beitrag zur Überlieferungsgeschichte der Tageseinträge und Diktate von Joseph Goebbels," Vierteljahrshefte für Zeitgeschichte 52 (2004): 479–526.
- Angela Hermann, "In 2 Tagen wurde Geschichte gemacht". Über den Charakter und Erkenntniswert der Goebbels-Tagebücher ["In Two Days, History Was Made": About the Character and Scientific Value of the Goebbels Diary]. Published in Stuttgart in 2008 (ISBN 978-3-9809603-4-2).
- Angela Hermann, Der Weg in den Krieg 1938/39. Quellenkritische Studien zu den Tagebüchern von Joseph Goebbels. München 2011 (ISBN 978-3-486-70513-3).

=== In English translation ===
- The Goebbels Diaries, 1939–1941, edited and translated by Fred Taylor. First published in London by Hamish Hamilton in 1982 (ISBN 0-241-10893-4). The first American edition was published by Putnam in 1983 (ISBN 0-399-12763-1). This translation of a previously unpublished part of Goebbel's diaries was the subject of controversy.
- The Goebbels Diaries, 1942–1943 was translated, edited, and introduced by Louis P. Lochner. First published by Doubleday in 1948. It was reprinted by Greenwood Press in 1970 (ISBN 0-837-13815-9)
- Final Entries 1945: The Diaries of Joseph Goebbels was translated by Richard Barry and edited, introduced, and annotated by Hugh Trevor-Roper. First published by Putnam in 1978 (ISBN 0-399-12116-1). An annotated edition was published by Pen and Sword in 2008 (ISBN 1-844-15646-X).

=== David Irving controversy ===
In 1992, author and Holocaust denier David Irving was tipped off that in May, 1945, Soviet soldiers had found 200 partially burned volumes and carted away copies of the diaries on glass microfiche where they were stored under lock and key at the Central State Archives in Moscow. Because the new archival material showed passages in Goebbels's handwriting that had only previously appeared in print, it was possible to authenticate previous editions. The Sunday Times of London paid Irving $125,000 to authenticate and translate the newly-discovered material. This created a minor scandal with protests outside Irving's London home. Irving's archival research became the basis for his work, "Goebbels: Mastermind of the Third Reich" which was contracted by St. Martin's Press to be published in 1996. Due to political pressure, St. Martin's broke the contract - an action that was criticized by the writer Christopher Hitchens.

== See also ==
- The Halder Diaries

== Sources ==
- Churcher, Sharon (30 May 1983). "The Goebbels Diaries: More Controversy Over Nazi Papers". New York Magazine: 9.
- Fest, Joachim E. (1970). The Face Of The Third Reich: Portraits Of The Nazi Leadership. New York: Pantheon. p. 90. ISBN 9780394734071. OCLC 556907716.
- Kershaw, Ian (1998). Hitler 1889–1936: Hubris. New York: W.W.Norton. ISBN 9780393046717.
- Kershaw, Ian (2008). Hitler: A Biography. New York: W. W. Norton & Company. ISBN 978-0-393-06757-6.
- Longerich, Peter (2015). Goebbels: A Biography. New York: Random House. ISBN 978-1400067510.
- Stroebel, Leslie; Zakia, Richard D. (1993). The Focal Encyclopedia of Photography. Focal Press. ISBN 9780240800592.
- Thacker, Toby (2010) [2009]. Joseph Goebbels: Life and Death. New York: Palgrave Macmillan. ISBN 978-0-230-27866-0.
