= Franz Halder =

General and chief of staff in Nazi Germany

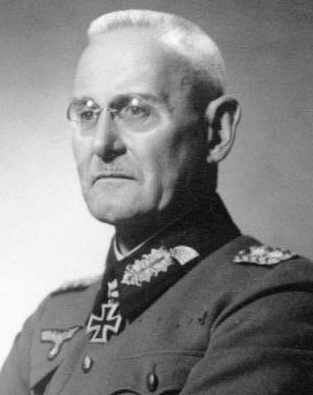
- Halder in 1939

Chief of the General Staff of the German Army High Command
- In office 1 September 1938 – 24 September 1942
- Leader: Adolf Hitler
- Superior: Walther von Brauchitsch (Note: Chief of OKH (until 19 December 1941))
- Preceded by: Ludwig Beck
- Succeeded by: Kurt Zeitzler

Personal details
- Born: 30 June 1884 Würzburg, Bavaria, Germany
- Died: 2 April 1972 (aged 87) Aschau im Chiemgau, Bavaria, West Germany
- Spouse: Gertrud Erl (m. 1907)

Military service
- Allegiance: German Empire (1902–1918); Weimar Republic (1918–1933); Nazi Germany (1933–1942)
- Branch/service: German Army
- Years of service: 1902–1942
- Rank: Generaloberst (Colonel-General)
- Battles/wars: World War I; World War II; Invasion of Poland; Operation Weserübung; Battle of France; Eastern Front; Operation Barbarossa; Operation Typhoon; Case Blue
- Awards: Knight's Cross of the Iron Cross

Franz Halder (30 June 1884 – 2 April 1972) was a German general and the chief of staff of the Army High Command (OKH) in Nazi Germany from 1938 until September 1942. During World War II, he directed the planning and implementation of Operation Barbarossa, the 1941 invasion of the Soviet Union. Halder became instrumental in the radicalisation of warfare on the Eastern Front. He had his staff draft both the Commissar Order (issued on 6 June 1941) and the Barbarossa decree (signed on 13 May 1941) that allowed German soldiers to execute Soviet citizens for any reason without fear of later prosecution, leading to numerous war crimes and atrocities during the campaign. After the war, he played a decisive role in the development of the myth of the clean Wehrmacht.

Halder began his military service in 1914. In 1937 he met and became a supporter of Adolf Hitler. Halder participated in the strategic planning for the 1939 German invasion of Poland. The plans authorised the SS to carry out security tasks – on behalf of the army – that included the imprisonment or execution of Poles. In July 1940 he began planning for the Axis invasion of the Soviet Union, Operation Barbarossa, which began on 22 June 1941. That summer Halder engaged in a long-running and divisive dispute with Hitler over strategy. Hitler removed Halder from command in September 1942. After the 20 July 1944 plot to assassinate Hitler, Halder was arrested as it came to light that he had been involved in an earlier plot, leading to his imprisonment. As chief of OKH General Staff, he had kept extensive notes, later published as The Halder Diaries.

After World War II Halder served as a lead consultant for the US Army Historical Division. He oversaw the writing of over 2,500 historical documents by 700 former German officers, whom he instructed to remove material detrimental to the image of the German armed forces. Halder used his influence to foster a false history of the German-Soviet conflict in which the German army fought a "noble war" and which denied its war crimes. The US Army overlooked Halder's apologia because Halder's group was providing military insights on the Soviet Union that were deemed valuable in the Cold War. In 1961, he was awarded the Meritorious Civilian Service Award.

== Early life and military career ==
Halder was born in Würzburg, the son of an officer. In 1902, he joined an artillery regiment under the command of his father. Halder was educated at the Bavarian War Academy, graduating in 1914. During World War I, he served in a variety of staff roles and was awarded the Iron Cross 1st Class. In 1919, he was transferred to the Reichswehr, where he served in staff and training roles, including under Walther von Brauchitsch in the army training department. In 1931, he was appointed as chief of staff of a military district. After being promoted to generalmajor (general-major) in October 1934, Halder served as the commander of the 7th Infantry Division in Munich.

== In the Wehrmacht ==
In August 1936, Halder was promoted to generalleutnant (lieutenant-general). He then became the director of the Manoeuvres Staff of the Wehrmacht. Between October 1937 and February 1938, Halder served as director of the Training Branch, on the General Staff of the Army, in Berlin. During the 1937 Wehrmacht manoeuvres, Halder met Adolf Hitler and became a loyal supporter. This personal contact also enabled him to progress through the ranks quickly.

On 1 February 1938, Halder was promoted to general of the Artillery. He was appointed chief of the General Staff of the Army High Command on 1 September. Within months of his appointment, Halder completed the first draft of a revised Handbook for General Staff Duty in War, which was issued in final form in August 1939. The revision removed the staff officer's traditional right to record formal written opposition to a commander's decision—a right that had existed primarily as a check on militarily unqualified royal appointees, and had already been fading from practice since the First World War. (Note: Halder later insisted—after the war—that he made the change entirely on his own initiative, but what it did was effectively strip from the General Staff its last formal mechanism for registering dissent once Hitler assumed sole command.)

Halder succeeded General Ludwig Beck who had resigned on 18 August amid the Sudetenland crisis. Halder was approached by conservative nationalist officers about heading the envisaged coup d'état should Hitler start a war, but he declined. Halder discussed the situation informally with US diplomat Raymond Geist and indicated that the Army feared that Hitler was about to start a war with the West. Despite the conspirators eventually foregoing a coup, Halder had in fact initiated contacts with them and at one point was committed seriously to the plot should Hitler instigate war, but this threshold was never met since the Munich Agreement averted the crisis, which left Halder on the verge of a breakdown. From that point forward, Halder accepted "a purely instrumental role for himself and the army, in his actions if perhaps not always in his heart."

Historian Geoffrey Megargee characterized Halder as a figure of conspicuous internal contradictions—calling him "an above-average military technician" whose grasp of global strategy and Germany's structural position in the international order was, by contrast, "correspondingly weak." Personally meticulous to the point of pedantry, with a public manner colleagues likened variously to a "university professor" or a schoolmaster depending on their estimation of him, Halder concealed behind that formal exterior an unusually sensitive temperament and a documented susceptibility to being overwhelmed by circumstance—his colleagues periodically observed him breaking into tears. His relationship with Hitler was structurally adversarial from the outset: where Halder prized technical expertise and logical process, Hitler's "instinctive, dilettantish approach to command" was precisely the mode of thinking Halder found most alien; Hitler, for his part, harbored the frontline soldier's habitual contempt for staff officers and found Halder's stiff bearing a perpetual irritant.

== World War II ==
=== Invasions of Poland and Western Europe ===
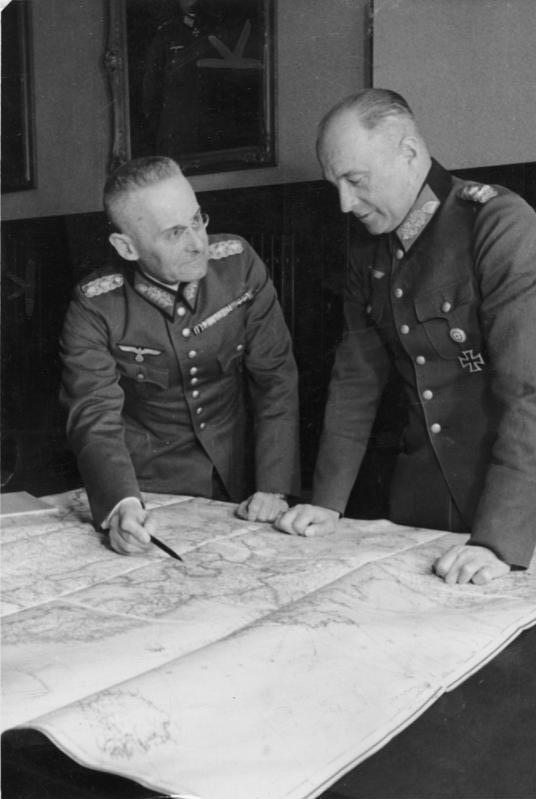
Halder with Walther von Brauchitsch during the invasion of Poland in 1939

Halder participated in the strategic planning for the Invasion of Poland. His plans authorised the SS to carry out security tasks on behalf of the army that included the imprisonment or execution of Polish citizens, whether Jewish or gentile. (Note: Many Polish troops and armed civilians were certain to wind up behind the German front lines...The Germans' approach to solving this problem, to which the idea of total war lent a kind of intellectual justification, was to counter any resistance with the utmost brutality, in the belief that they could cow the population into passivity and even, perhaps, collaboration. In line with that approach, on July 24, 1939, General Wagner, now the army's quartermaster general, issued a set of special regulations that authorized German troops to take and execute hostages in the event of attacks by snipers or irregulars. In some regions German forces were also to detain all Polish males – Jewish and gentile – between the ages of seventeen and forty-five as prisoners of war, whether found armed or not. And because front-line combat troops were in high demand, the army's leaders quickly decided to use SS and police units to augment their own forces for security tasks. Halder informed his subordinates on the general staff of such plans as early as April 1939, and the SS began putting together its preparations in early May.) On 1 September 1939, the German offensive began, resulting in declarations of war by France and the British Empire. On 19 September, Halder noted in his diary that he had received information from Reinhard Heydrich. The SS were beginning their campaign to "clean house" in Poland of Jews, intelligentsia, Catholic clergy, and the aristocracy. Halder was aware of The Holocaust but did not object to the murders. He dismissed the crimes as aberrations and refused one general's request to pursue the SS and police perpetrators.

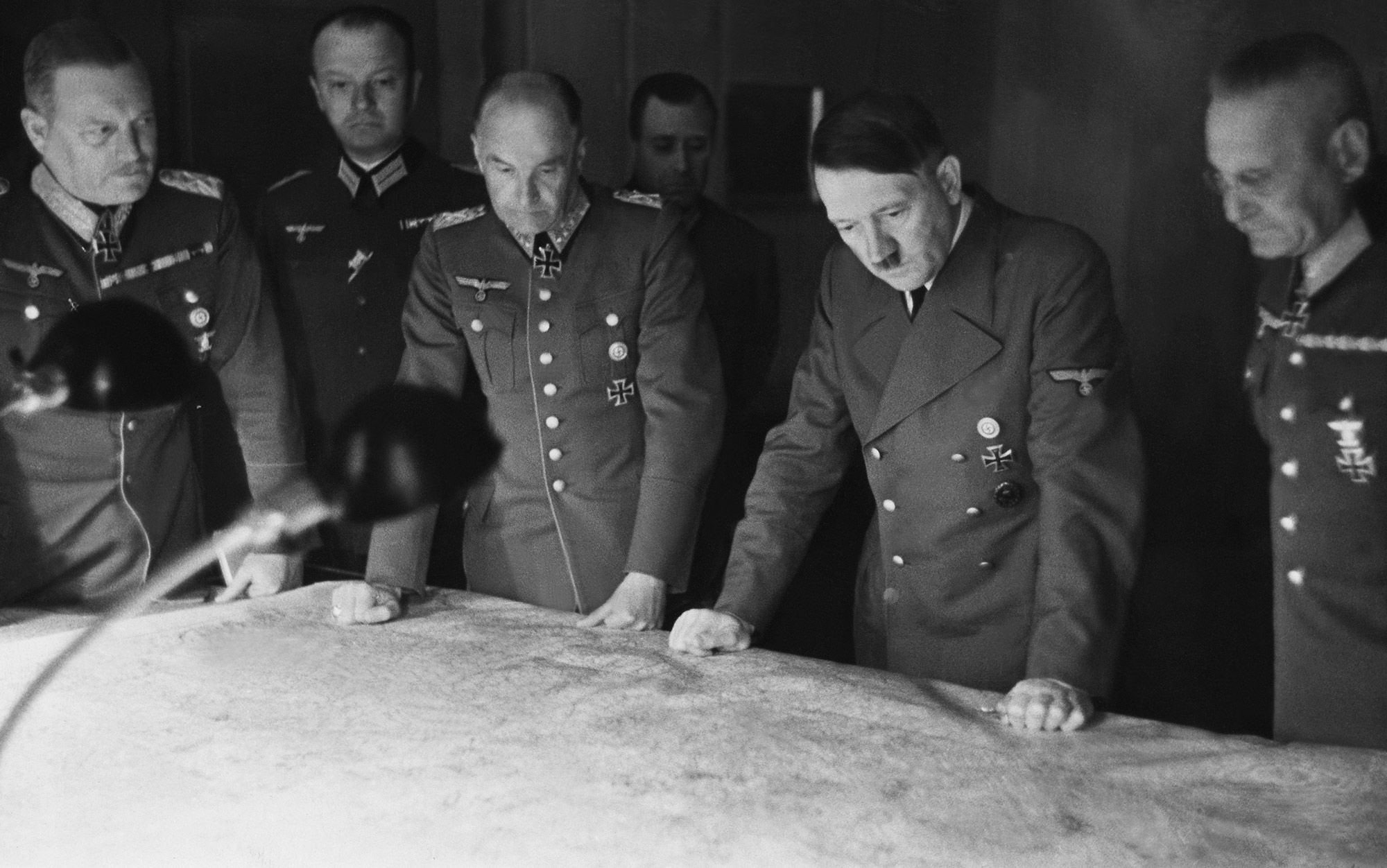
Halder (far right) alongside Hitler, 1940

At the end of 1939, Halder oversaw the development of the invasion plans of France, the Low Countries and the Balkans. During a meeting with Hitler on 5 November Walther von Brauchitsch, the Army commander-in-chief, attempted to talk Hitler into putting off the invasion of France. Hitler refused and berated Brauchitsch for incompetence. As a consequence, Halder and Brauchitsch discussed overthrowing Hitler because they feared the invasion was doomed. They decided against the idea. On 23 November 1939 Carl Friedrich Goerdeler met with Halder to ask him to reconsider his decision. He refused, saying that Hitler was a great leader, and "one does not rebel when face to face with the enemy". Halder's contemplation of resistance to Hitler owed more to political turf battles than it did to disagreement over the regime's racism and antisemitism.

General Erich von Manstein's bold plan for invading France through the Ardennes Forest proved successful, and ultimately led to the fall of France. On 19 July 1940, Halder was promoted to generaloberst (colonel-general) and began to receive undisclosed monthly extralegal payments from Hitler that effectively doubled his already large wage.

=== Invasion of the Soviet Union ===
On 30 March 1941 Halder attended the conference where Hitler described the planned invasion to about 200 senior Wehrmacht officers. He later wrote in his diary, summarising Hitler's remarks:

We must forget the concept of comradeship between soldiers. A Communist is no comrade before or after the battle. This is a war of extermination. (...) Commanders must make the sacrifice of overcoming their personal scruples.

Halder was instrumental in the subsequent preparation and implementation of war crimes during the invasion of the Soviet Union. He had his staff draft both the Commissar Order and the Barbarossa decree without Hitler's instruction or interference. The author of the orders was Eugen Müller, who reported on his work directly to Halder. The Commissar Order required political commissars to be executed immediately when captured. Halder also insisted that a clause be added to the Barbarossa decree giving officers the right to raze whole villages and execute the inhabitants. The decree freed soldiers from any form of prosecution for war crimes committed in the East. The decree had no specific target: Soviet citizens could be killed at any time and for any reason. Until this time only the SS could kill citizens without fear of later prosecution. These orders allowed officers throughout the army to execute citizens with no repercussions. Ulrich von Hassell, discussing the orders given by Halder, said the conquered population were being controlled by despotism. He added that Germans were being turned into a type of being that previously existed only in enemy propaganda. Omer Bartov described the orders as "the barbarisation of warfare".

The offensive began on 22 June 1941 where the German forces initially met muted resistance. Halder brashly wrote in his diary on 3 July that the war was already won. Nicolaus von Below reported that this confidence was shared at Fuhrer Headquarters in the month of July. Halder's confidence was dashed with dramatic effect in early August with the arrival of new intelligence information from his Foreign Armies East. He wrote in his diary on 11 August that he had underestimated the "Russian colossus". At the start of the campaign, he had reckoned the enemy had 200 divisions, but now 360 had been counted. He added: "We destroy a dozen of them, then the Russians put another dozen in their place." In mid-August, the German advance had stalled, and at the same time, effective long-term defence was impossible so far from friendly territory. Halder wrote of the situation: "Everything that has so far been achieved is for nothing." During that summer, Hitler and the Army General Staff led by Halder had been engaged in a long and divisive dispute over strategy. By mid-September, it was clear Operation Barbarossa had failed in its central objective to quickly overcome the Soviet Union.

==== Operation Typhoon ====
Operation Typhoon, the German offensive at the Battle of Moscow, began on 2 October 1941. In early October, the German forces encircled the bulk of the Soviet armies defending the capital city in the Vyazma and Bryansk pocket. Halder determined the strategy for Typhoon, and it was subsequently endorsed by Hitler. Typhoon had the same basic flaw as Barbarossa; officers on the front line were unable to change Halder's objectives even when those objectives were impossible.

The Barbarossa decree and Commissar Order became a fundamental aspect of the battle for Moscow. By this time, thousands of Soviet civilians and defenceless prisoners in already occupied Russia were being murdered every day. The killings were unprecedented in the modern era and radicalised the defence of Moscow. On 5 December Operation Typhoon was over. Halder wrote in his diary there was no more strength and a withdrawal may be necessary. The withdrawal, when it came, was dictated by the Soviet army. The crisis on the battlefield prompted Hitler to remove von Brauchitsch and assume command of OKH himself.

Halder vehemently pushed for a blitzkrieg assault on Moscow and believed if the capital could be taken the war would be won. However, he did not understand the fundamental underpinnings of blitzkrieg and the impossibility of carrying out a lightning war in the vast expanse of the Soviet Union. Even if Moscow had fallen, Stalin would have moved his base of operations farther east and the war would have continued.

David Stahel writes: "The Soviet Union was nothing less than a militarised juggernaut and, while deeply wounded in Germany's 1941 campaign, there is no evidence to suggest it was about to collapse either politically or militarily." The responsibility for the failure fell on Halder, Hitler and Fedor von Bock. The war in the Soviet Union and the winter that followed was one of the worst chapters in the history of the German army—there were over one million casualties.

==== Case Blue ====
In the spring of 1942, Halder, along with the German high command, began planning a new ambitious offensive in the Soviet Union. This was despite the heavy losses the Wehrmacht had suffered in 1941. Under the code name "Case Blue", the plan envisaged an offensive against the southern sector of the front. The aim was to capture the Soviet oil fields in the Caucasus. The directive for the offensive was issued by Hitler on 5 April 1942, envisaging a complex sequence of staggered operations. The offensive began on 28 June 1942 and at the outset appeared successful; Friedrich Paulus cut through a defensive position with ease and Bock wrote: "There was nothing left: The enemy has not succeeded in organizing a new defense anywhere."

The Soviet army had adopted a new strategy known as the "elastic defence" that was highly uncharacteristic of prior engagements and left the German army closing in on an enemy that had already left. Confusion ensued leading to the failure of the campaign. Bock was removed as Commander of Army Group B, replaced by Maximillian von Weichs and Halder was marginalised. The relationship between Hitler and Halder became strained. Halder's diary entries became increasingly sarcastic, and Hitler mocked him. On one occasion Hitler said Halder had spent World War I in an office "sitting on that same swivel stool". By late August 1942, the relationship between Hitler and Halder was essentially over. On 24 September, at the close of the regular midday briefing, Hitler told him their confrontations had worn down his nerves and Halder's alike, after which, the OKW chief left without further exchange. On 24 September Hitler replaced Halder as Chief of Staff of the OKH with Kurt Zeitzler and retired him to the Führer Reserve.

=== Imprisonment ===
On 23 July 1944, after the failed 20 July assassination attempt on Hitler's life by German Army officers, the Gestapo arrested Halder. Although he was not involved in 20 July plot, intense interrogations of the conspirators revealed that Halder had been involved in earlier conspiracies against Hitler. Halder was imprisoned at both the Flossenbürg and Dachau concentration camps. Halder's wife Gertrud chose, and was allowed, to accompany her husband into imprisonment. He had no complaints about the quarters or provisions and was not treated poorly. He was in VIP company that included former French premier Leon Blum and former Austrian Chancellor Kurt Schuschnigg. On 31 January 1945, Halder was officially dismissed from the army. In the last days of April 1945, together with other special prisoners, he was transferred to the South Tyrol where he was liberated by US troops.

=== Antisemitism ===
Before the invasion of the Soviet Union, three million soldiers destined for the front received a key order. It was titled "Guidelines for the Conduct of the Troops in Russia". The language was determined by Halder. It described Bolshevism as the "mortal enemy of the National Socialist German people" and urged German forces to "crack down hard" and "eliminate all resistance". Jews were mentioned in the order and intended to be part of the elimination. In April 1941 Halder drafted an order for the security police and Security Service during Operation Marita. The order defined the enemy as saboteurs, terrorists, communists and Jews. The "criminal orders" drafted by Halder document his solidarity with Hitler's antisemitic and racist policies. The commanders under Halder including Erich Hoepner, Erich von Manstein and Walter von Reichenau gave antisemitic speeches and orders.

== Post-war ==
=== Criminal investigation ===
On 5 May 1945, Halder was arrested by the advancing American troops and was interned awaiting trial or release. He was relieved not to be part of the Nuremberg trials; instead, he was tried in a German court on charges of aiding the Nazi regime. Halder denied any knowledge of the regime's atrocities and claimed to be outside the decision-making process; he was found not guilty.

During the trial the prosecuting attorney gained access to Halder's personal diary which detailed his formulation of the Barbarossa decree and Commissar Order so he was subsequently sent for retrial. Halder was working for the American Historical Division providing information on the Soviet Union, and the Americans refused to allow the retrial. It was dropped in September 1950.

=== Myth of the clean Wehrmacht ===
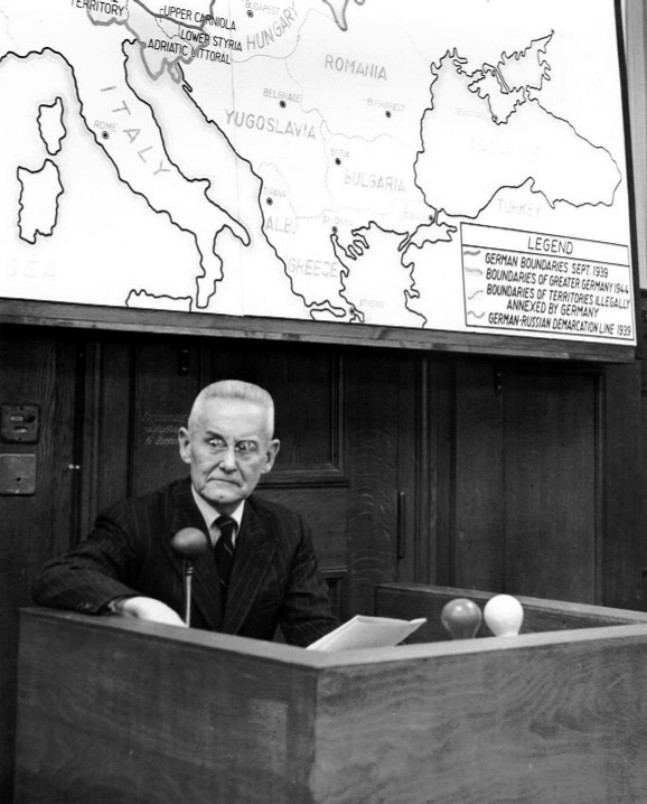
Halder as a witness at the High Command Trial, 1948

Halder played a key role in creating the myth of the clean Wehrmacht. It was a false, mythic view of the Nazi-Soviet war in which the German army fought a "noble war". It denies the existence of, or disregards, German war crimes. The genesis for the myth was the "Generals' Memorandum" created in November 1945 and submitted to the International Military Tribunal in Nuremberg. The memorandum was titled "The German Army from 1920 to 1945". It was co-authored by Halder and former field marshals Walther von Brauchitsch and Erich von Manstein and other senior military figures. It aimed to portray the German armed forces as apolitical and largely innocent of the crimes committed by the Nazi regime. The strategy outlined in the memorandum was later adopted by Hans Laternser, the lead counsel for the defence at the High Command Trial of senior Wehrmacht commanders. The document was written at the suggestion of American General William J. Donovan, who later founded the Central Intelligence Agency (CIA), and viewed the Soviet Union as a global threat to world peace. Donovan served as a deputy prosecutor at the International Military Tribunal; he and some other US representatives did not believe the trials should proceed. He believed America should do everything it could to secure Germany as a military ally against the Soviet Union in the growing Cold War.

As the Cold War progressed, the military intelligence provided by the German section of the US Army Historical Division became increasingly important to the Americans. Halder oversaw the German section of the research program which became known as the "Halder Group". His group produced over 2,500 major historical manuscripts from over 700 distinct German authors detailing World War II. Halder used the group to reinvent war-time history using truth, half-truth, distortion and lies. He set up a "control group" of trusted former Nazi officers who vetted all the manuscripts and, if necessary, required authors to change their content. Halder's deputy in the group was Adolf Heusinger who was also working for the Gehlen Organization, the United States military intelligence organisation in Germany. Halder expected to be addressed as "General" by the writing teams and behaved as their commanding officer while dealing with their manuscripts. His aim was to exonerate German army personnel of the atrocities they had committed.

Halder laid down a version of history that all the writers had to abide by. This version stated that the army was the victim of Hitler, and they had opposed him at every opportunity. The writers had to emphasise the "decent" form of war conducted by the army and blame the SS for the criminal operations. He enjoyed a privileged position, as the few historians working on World War II history in the 1950s had to obtain historical information from Halder and his group. His influence extended to newspaper editors and authors. Halder's instructions were sent down the chain of command and were recorded by former field marshal Georg von Küchler. They said: "It is German deeds, seen from the German standpoint, that are to be recorded; this will constitute a memorial to our troops", "no criticism of measures ordered by the leadership" is allowed and no one is to be "incriminated in any way," instead the achievements of the Wehrmacht were to be emphasised. The military historian Bernd Wegner, examining Halder's work, wrote: "The writing of German history on the Second World War, and in particular on the Russian front, was for over two decades, and in part up to the present day—and to a far greater extent than most people realize—the work of the defeated." Wolfram Wette wrote, "In the work of the Historical Division the traces of the war of annihilation for which the Wehrmacht leadership was responsible were covered up".

Halder sought to distance himself and the German army from Hitler, Nazism and war crimes. He claimed to have been against the Russian campaign and that he had warned Hitler against his "adventure" in the East. He omitted any mention of the Barbarossa decree that he had helped formulate or the Commissar Order which he had supported and disseminated. Halder also claimed implausibly that the invasion of the Soviet Union was a defensive measure.

The Americans were aware the manuscripts contained numerous apologia. However, they also contained intelligence that the Americans viewed as important in the event of a war between the US and the Soviet Union. Halder had coached former Nazi officers on how to make incriminating evidence disappear. Many of the officers he coached such as Heinz Guderian went on to write best-selling biographies that broadened the appeal of the apologia. Halder succeeded in his aim of rehabilitating the German officer corps, first with the US military, then widening circles of politics and finally millions of Americans.

In 1949 Halder wrote Hitler als Feldherr which was translated into English as Hitler as Commander and published in 1950. The work contains the central ideas behind the myth of the clean Wehrmacht that were subsequently reproduced in countless histories and memoirs. The book describes an idealised commander who is then compared to Hitler. The commander is noble, wise, against the war in the East and free of any guilt. Hitler alone is responsible for the evil committed; his complete immorality is contrasted with the moral behaviour of the commander who has done no wrong.

Halder's myth-making was not concentrated solely on absolving himself and the German army from war crimes; he also created two strategic and operational myths. The first is that Hitler alone was responsible for the military blunders during the invasion of the Soviet Union. The second myth is that the blitzkrieg campaign he so strongly advocated would have resulted in the capture of Moscow and won the war for Germany. The historians Ronald Smelser and Edward J. Davies writing in The Myth of the Eastern Front said "Franz Halder embodies better than any other high German officer the dramatic difference between myth and reality as it emerged after World War II".

=== Retirement ===
Halder's work with the Historical Commission drew to a close at the end of the 1950s, and he received praise from The Pentagon. Rear Admiral Walter Ansel who had worked with Halder while researching Operation Sea Lion, the planned Invasion of England, recommended he become an associate of the United States Naval Institute. In 1961 he was awarded the Meritorious Civilian Service Award for this work. This award was bestowed by Major General Edgar C. Doleman on behalf of President John F. Kennedy. Halder thus became the only German to be decorated by both Adolf Hitler and an American president. (He had received the Knight's Cross of the Iron Cross from Hitler in 1939.)

During the 1960s, Halder became akin to a "historical icon", fielding questions from historians and general public alike. Halder died in 1972 in Aschau im Chiemgau, Bavaria.

== Awards ==
- Iron Cross (1914) 1st Class
- Knight's Cross of the Iron Cross on 27 October 1939 as General of the Artillery and Chief of General Staff of the German Army
- US Meritorious Civilian Service Award (1961)

== Bibliography ==
- Barnett, Correlli, ed. (2003). Hitler's Generals. Grove Press. ISBN 978-0802139948.
- Bellamy, Chris (2007). Absolute War: Soviet Russia in the Second World War. Alfred A. Knopf. ISBN 978-0-375-41086-4.
- Citino, Robert M. (2007). Death of the Wehrmacht: The German Campaigns of 1942. University Press of Kansas. ISBN 978-0-7006-1791-3.
- Fugate, Bryan I. (1984). Operation Barbarossa: Strategy and Tactics on the Eastern Front, 1941. USA: Presido Press. ISBN 978-0-907590-27-9.
- Hartmann, Christian (1991). Halder. Generalstabschef Hitlers 1938–1942 (in German). Germany: Schoeningh Ferdinand Gmbh. ISBN 3-506-77484-0.
- Hebert, Valerie (2010). Hitler's Generals on Trial: The Last War Crimes Tribunal at Nuremberg. Lawrence, Kansas: University Press of Kansas. ISBN 978-0-7006-1698-5.
- Klee, Ernst (2016). Personenlexikon zum Dritten Reich: Wer war was vor und nach 1945 (in German). Hamburg: Nikol Verlag. ISBN 978-3-86820-311-0.
- Lemay, Benoît (2010). Erich von Manstein: Hitler's Master Strategist. Heyward, Pierce (trans.). Havertown, PA; Newbury, Berkshire: Casemate Publishers. ISBN 978-1-935149-26-2.
- Megargee, Geoffrey P. (2000). Inside Hitler's High Command. Lawrence: University Press of Kansas. ISBN 0-7006-1187-8.
- Megargee, Geoffrey P. (2006). War of Annihilation: Combat and Genocide on the Eastern Front, 1941. Lanham, MD: Rowman & Littlefield. ISBN 978-0-7425-4482-6.
- Müller, Rolf-Dieter (2015). Enemy in the East: Hitler's Secret Plans to Invade the Soviet Union. London: I.B. Tauris. ISBN 978-1-78076-829-8.
- Rossino, Alexander B. (2003). Hitler Strikes Poland: Blitzkrieg, Ideology, and Atrocity. USA: University of Kansas. doi:10.2307/j.ctv9b2tst. ISBN 978-0-7006-1392-2.
- Scherzer, Veit (2007). Die Ritterkreuzträger 1939–1945 [The Knight's Cross Bearers 1939–1945] (in German). Jena, Germany: Scherzers Militaer-Verlag. ISBN 978-3-938845-17-2.
- Smelser, Ronald; Davies, Edward J. (2008). The Myth of the Eastern Front: The Nazi-Soviet War in American Popular Culture. New York: Cambridge University Press. p. 73. ISBN 978-0-521-83365-3.
- Stahel, David (2009). Operation Barbarossa and Germany's Defeat in the East. Cambridge, UK: Cambridge University Press. ISBN 978-0-521-76847-4.
- Stahel, David (2013). Operation Typhoon: Hitler's March on Moscow, October 1941. Cambridge: Cambridge University Press. ISBN 978-1-107-03512-6.
- Stahel, David (2015). The Battle for Moscow. Cambridge: Cambridge University Press. ISBN 978-1-107-08760-6.
- Wette, Wolfram (2006). The Wehrmacht: History, Myth, Reality. Cambridge, Mass.: Harvard University Press. ISBN 978-0-674-02577-6.
- Wheeler-Bennett, John (1967). The Nemesis of Power The German Army In Politics 1918–1945. London: Macmillan. OCLC 72387321.
- Wichmann, Manfred (2014). "Franz Halder 1884–1972". Lebendiges Museum Online (in German). Deutsches Historisches Museum.
