= The Halder Diaries =

Diary entries written by Franz Halder

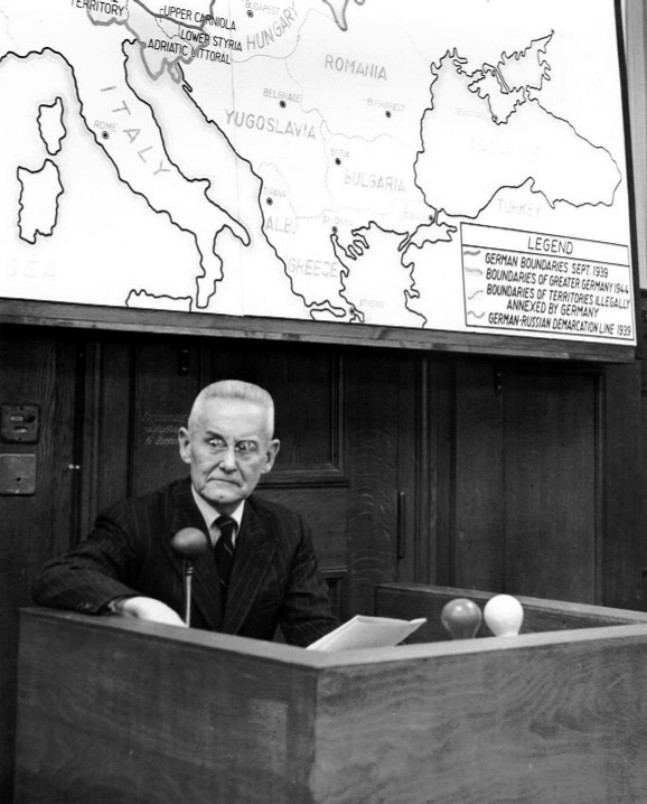
Halder at the Nuremberg Trials

The Halder Diaries is a collection of diaries written by German Colonel General Franz Halder.

He was able to make extensive notes of Hitler’s conversations or closed speeches to generals using shorthand.

The diaries were published as The Halder Diaries: The Private War Journals of Colonel General Franz Halder in two volumes in 1976 by Westview Press of Boulder, Colorado, with an introduction by Trevor N. Dupuy (ISBN 9780891581062). The original German version had the title Kriegstagebuch ("War Diaries"), and the translation had been published in eight volumes in 1948 by the Office of Chief Counsel for War Crimes, Office of Military Government for Germany (U.S.).

== See also ==
- Goebbels Diaries
