= Chróstnik =

- City
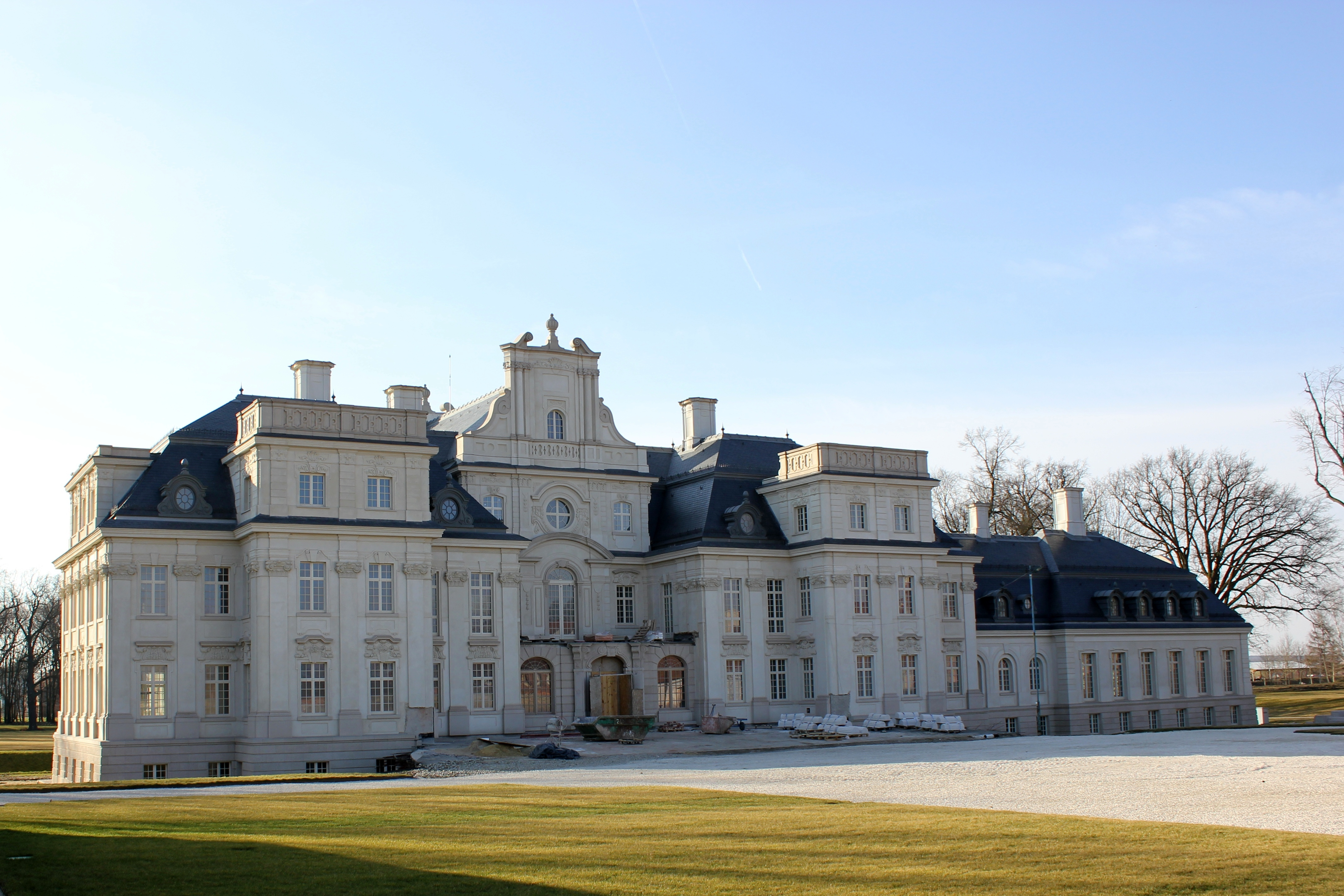
- An 18th-century restored palace in Chróstnik

- Location within Poland
- Coordinates: 51°21′N 16°10′E
- Country: Poland
- Voivodeship: Lower Silesian Voivodeship
- County: Lubin
- Gmina: Lubin

Chróstnik [ˈxrustnik] (German: Brauchitschdorf) is a village in the administrative district of Gmina Lubin, within Lubin County, Lower Silesian Voivodeship, in south-western Poland.

== History ==
The village is originally mentioned as Old Polish Chrustenik (meaning shrubbery or brushwood) with the parish church under the patronage of a Boleslaw von Brauchitsch in 1222. Members of the Brauchitsch noble family were landowners here up to 1633.

The Baroque Brauchitschdorf Palace was erected from 1723 to 1728 and enlarged in 1909. After World War II the Red Army plundered the building. A fire in September 1976 destroyed the building further. Polish entrepreneur Dariusz Miłek bought the ruins from the Polish state and began restoring the palace.

== Notable people ==
- House of Brauchitsch
- Benjamin Schmolck (1672-1737), composer
