= Ludwig von Brauchitsch =

German officer (1757–1827)

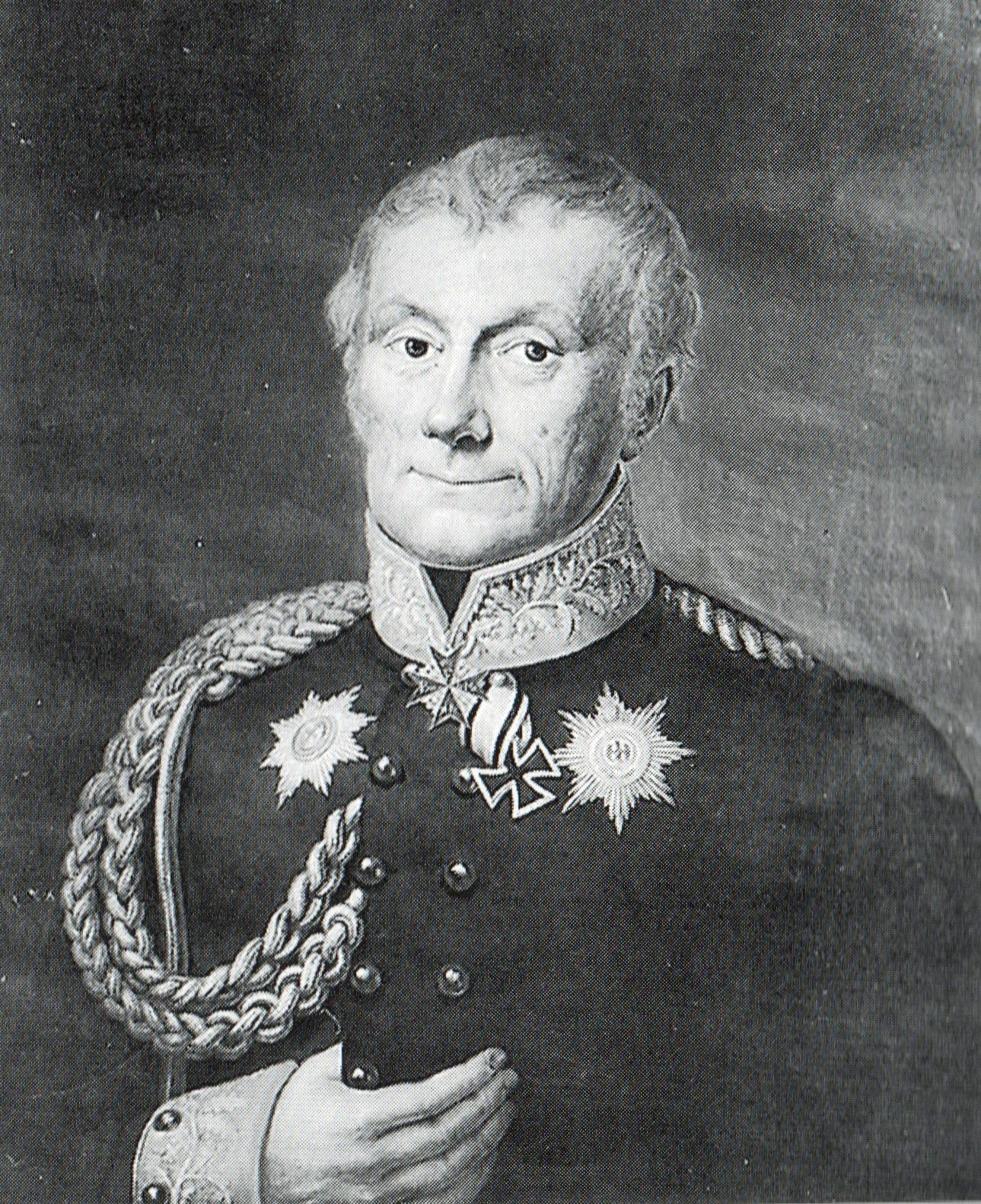
- Born: Ludwig Matthias Nathanael Gottlieb von Brauchitsch; 7 May 1757; Prussia
- Died: 19 January 1827 (aged 69); Prussia
- Military career
- Allegiance: Prussia
- Rank: Lieutenant General

Ludwig Matthias Nathanael Gottlieb von Brauchitsch (1757–1827) was an aristocratic Prussian lieutenant general who fought in the Napoleonic Wars and was a recipient of the Pour le Mérite.

== Biography ==
=== Birth and family ===
Brauchitsch was born in 1757 and came from the old Silesian noble family of the von Brauchitsch. He was the son of a Prussian captain of artillery, Mathias Friedrich von Brauchitsch (1712 - 1757), and his wife Marie Magdalene Elisabeth (1736 - 1766), born in Oertzen.

=== Military career ===
In 1772, Brauchitsch joined Prince Ferdinand of Prussia's private infantry regiment as a corporal. With his regiment he took part in the War of the Bavarian Succession. In 1781, he was promoted to second lieutenant, and in 1790, first lieutenant. He fought in the War of the First Coalition, as a staff officer, and took part in the siege of Mainz. During the subsequent Battle of Mombach he was wounded in the head, but by a miracle survived. For his service during the defense of Danzig in 1807 during the War of the Fourth Coalition, he received on in 1807 Frederick William III's Pour le Mérite.

In 1809, he was appointed lieutenant colonel and city commander of Berlin. He participated in the 1813 War of Liberation, in the organization of the country's storm against Napoleon's army, with the rank of lieutenant-general. He later worked with the Governor House of Berlin.

=== Marriage ===
Brauchitsch married Wilhelmine Sophie Charlotte Luise in 1782, the sister of General Field Marshal Friedrich von Kleist. From this marriage two children were born:

- Luise Sophie Albertine Julie (born 6 March 1784)
- Karl Philipp Friedrich Ludwig (born 18 March 1785)

=== Resting place ===
His grave is located at the Old Garrison Cemetery. The tomb, according to the designs of Schinkel and the sculptor Ludwig Wilhelm Wichmann, is one of the most perfect works of the Berlin. In 1928, ferrous foundry, chose the tomb to the subject of their New Year plaque.
