= Duke Ernst Medal =

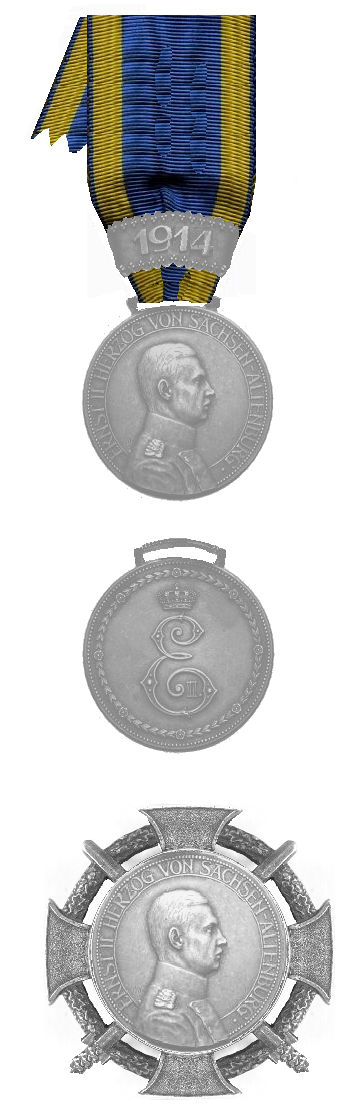
- Native name: Herzog-Ernst-Medaille
- Awarded for: Military Valour and Merit, Civil Merit
- Country: (Duchy of Saxe-Altenburg) Saxe-Altenburg
- Status: Defunct
- Ribbon

The Duke Ernst Medal (German: Herzog Ernst-Medaille) was an award of the Duchy of Saxe-Altenburg. It was founded on the 16th of September 1906 to commemorate the eightieth birthday of Duke Ernst I. The Medal was originally intended for civil merits and actions that benefited the duchy and its ducal house. The medal was worn on a blue silk ribbon with two gold stripes on the left breast. The round silver or gold medal has a diameter of 31 millimetres. Ladies wore the medal with or without a crown and/or clasp on a lady's bow of the same blue-and-gold ribbon on the left shoulder.

The first type of the medal bears a left-facing portrait of the reigning monarch, Ernst I, wearing military uniform, and bears the legend "ERNST I HERZOG VON SACHSEN-ALTENBURG". On the reverse is an ornamented monogram E (for Ernst) with a ducal crown above. To the sides of the monogram are the dates 1826 and 1906. Beneath the monogram is the medal's date of foundation, 16 September.

On 1 August 1909, a year, six months, and twenty-two days after the death of Ernst I, his nephew Ernst II updated the portrait and legend with his own. The second type reads "ERNST II HERZOG VON SACHSEN-ALTENBURG" with a depiction of the duke also in military uniform, facing right. The reverse was also changed, with the dates being removed, and the monogram of Ernst II, an ornamented E with II in the bottom loop. Surrounding this is a floral motif with eight five-petalled roses.

During the First World War, the medal took on a second role, as a reward for military feats. On 31 August, a silver crown with the year 1914 underneath was introduced.

Later that year, crossed swords were also introduced as a sign of military merit. The silver swords were worn crossed on the ribbon. When this military medal was awarded for the second time, a silver crown was soldered to the medal. The members of the Ducal staff were allowed to wear a silver oak leaf with the year 1914/15 on the ribbon when they had accompanied their monarch on an inspection at the front.

The medal was worn on a sky-blue ribbon with yellow edge stripes on the left breast. The ribbon loop on which the medal was worn was of the immovable type widely used in Saxony and Baden, and was part of the medal. A narrow clasp with the year 1914/15 was placed on the ribbon. The edges were decorated with crowns of rue, the symbol of the House of Wettin.

The medals were only awarded to subjects of Saxe-Altenburg and soldiers who served in the 153rd Infantry Regiment (8th Thuringian), based in Altenburg.

On 29 June 1918, there was a need for a military decoration for those Altenburger soldiers who had already been decorated with the Duke Ernst medal with the swords and the crown and had further distinguished themselves, but were ineligible for any further military decoration. The duke chose a typical German pinback cross in which the medal occupies a central place.

A wreath of laurels and oak leaves and a cross pattée have been laid around the medal. Two crossed swords are placed under the cross. This Steckkreuz was worn as a brooch on the left breast. The design is simple; A silver medal of the existing model, without a ring, was placed on the silver cross. The manufacturer was the Elimeyer company in Dresden. The First Class was only awarded to subjects of Saxe-Altenburg and soldiers in the 8th Thuringian Infantry Regiment No. 153 who had already been decorated twice with the Iron Cross. This makes the cross, which was awarded 86 times, very rare. The medal is located at the bottom right of the obverse, bearing the maker's mark "M.H." (Max Haseroth). The 1st Class is 47 millimeters high and weighs 38 grams.

Ernst II founded the I Class to replace the Altenburg Duke Ernst medal with swords on the ribbon. The bearers of this medal were allowed to exchange their medal for the First Class of the Duke Ernst Medal, as long as they were still alive and possessed the Iron Cross I Class. The bravery medal and the Duke Ernst medal with oak leaves were worn next to the I Class of the medal.

During the First World War, at least one medal worn on the ribbon was struck in gold. This medal was worn in a ring decorated with brilliants and connected to a crown decorated with brilliants on the ribbon. The clasp with the year 1914/15 was also decorated with brilliants.

== Divisions and Types of the Duke-Ernst Medal ==
Civil Division

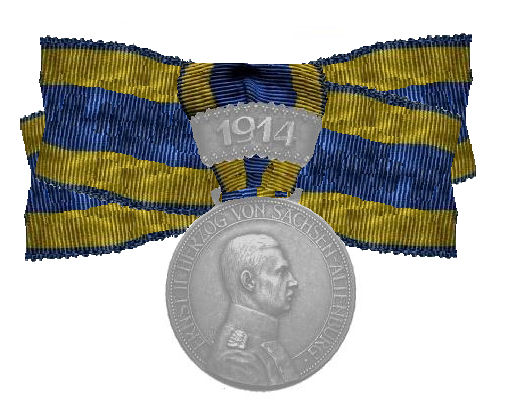
The Civil medal with "1914" clasp worn on a lady's bow

Type I

- Gold medal with crown (Duke Ernst I in profile) 1891-1908 type obverse
- Gold medal (Duke Ernst I in profile) 1891-1908 type obverse
- Silver medal with crown (Duke Ernst I in profile) 1891-1908 type obverse
- Silver medal (Duke Ernst in profile) 1891-1908 type obverse

The "gold medals" and the Crowns are actually gilt silver.

Type II

- Gold medal with crown (Duke Ernst II) 1909-1918
- Gold medal
- Gold medal with clasp "1914" (1916-1918)
- Gold medal with clasp "25"
- Silver medal with crown
- Silver medal

Military Division

- Silver medal with crown and swords (Duke Ernst II) 1915-1918
- Silver medal with swords (1915-1918)
- Silver medal with crown and clasp "1914" (1916-1918)
- Silver medal with clasp "1914" (1916-1918)
- Gold medal with crown and clasp "1914" in gold and brilliants
- Silver medal with oak leaves and swords on the ribbon
- Silver medal oak leaves on the ribbon

The gold medal and the gold crown are made of solid gold.

Each of these military medals was awarded with a device to indicate that the medal was awarded for military feats, as simple silver medals were of the civil division.

Despite the miserable state of the war economy in 1918 and the shortage of materials, Saxe-Altenburg never used war metals such as zinc or iron.

- 1st class with swords. (pinback cross)

== Notable Recipients ==
- The photographer, Albert Meyer, received the civil version of the medal.
- The General Adolf von Brauchitsch received the military version of the medal

== Literature ==
- Ehrenzeichen des Herzogtums Sachsen-Altenburg 1814 – 1918, PögeDruck, Leipzig-Mölkau ISBN 3-9806235-4-8
- Jörg Nimmergut, Katalog Orden & Ehrenzeichen von 1800 bis 1945, München 2012
- Wolf Graf Baudissin und Eva Gräfin Baudissin: Spemanns goldenes Buch der Sitte. Berlin, Stuttgart [1901]
