= Princely Reuss Honour Cross =

Order of merit in Germany

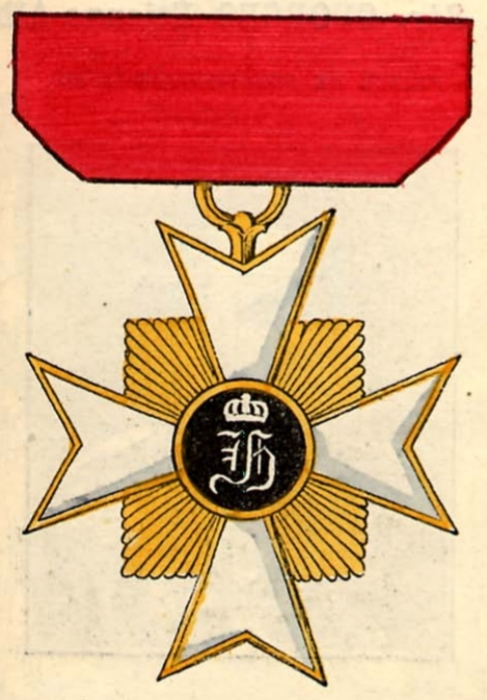
- Awarded for: Military or Civil Merit
- Ribbon: variable ribbons either purple or blue with a red centre stripe in peacetime. and yellow with yellow, red, and black edge stripes
- Obverse: coat of arms of the house of Reuss in gold on red enamel
- Reverse: the letter H in Fraktur surmounted by a crown in gold on black enamel
- Reuss-Gera peacetime ribbon Reuss-Greiz peacetime ribbon shared wartime ribbon

The Princely Reuss Honour Cross was an order of merit common to the principalities of Reuss Junior line and Reuss Elder line. It was founded by Heinrich XIV, Prince Reuss Younger Line in 1869, and in 1902 became a state order of the Elder Line Principality as well.

== History ==
The order was founded by Heinrich XIV of Reuss Younger line, to reward meritorious service towards the prince and the principality of Reuss-Gera. it was initially envisioned as an order in three classes, with 1st going to Generalmajors (then equivalent to a brigadier general) and civilian officials of equivalent rank, 2nd class going to Field officers and civilians of equivalent rank, and 3rd class going to Junior officers and civilians of equivalent rank.

In 1885 a fourth class was added, along with a subclass of 1st class, which added a crown to the cross. This new reform also brought in a merit medal, intended for Non-commissioned officers and Civilians of equivalent rank. In 1897 the medal was divided into a gold and silver medal.

With the death of Heinrich XXII, Prince Reuss of Greiz in 1902, and the accession of his Mentally disabled son Heinrich XXIV, Prince Reuss of Greiz, the new regent Heinrich XXVII, Prince Reuss Younger Line, son of Heinrich XIV introduced the order to the Reuss-Greiz honours system.

In 1909 the last major change to the order was made. This saw the introduction of the new grade of 'officer's cross' was introduced. The reforms also stated that the attachment of a crown could now be made to any grade except the silver medal, to indicate greater merit. A new crossed swords attachment was introduced for the military division.

In 1915, with the outbreak of World War I a new unified ribbon was introduced which could be awarded with or without swords on the ribbon.

With the Abolition of the Monarchy, the order became obsolete.

== Description ==
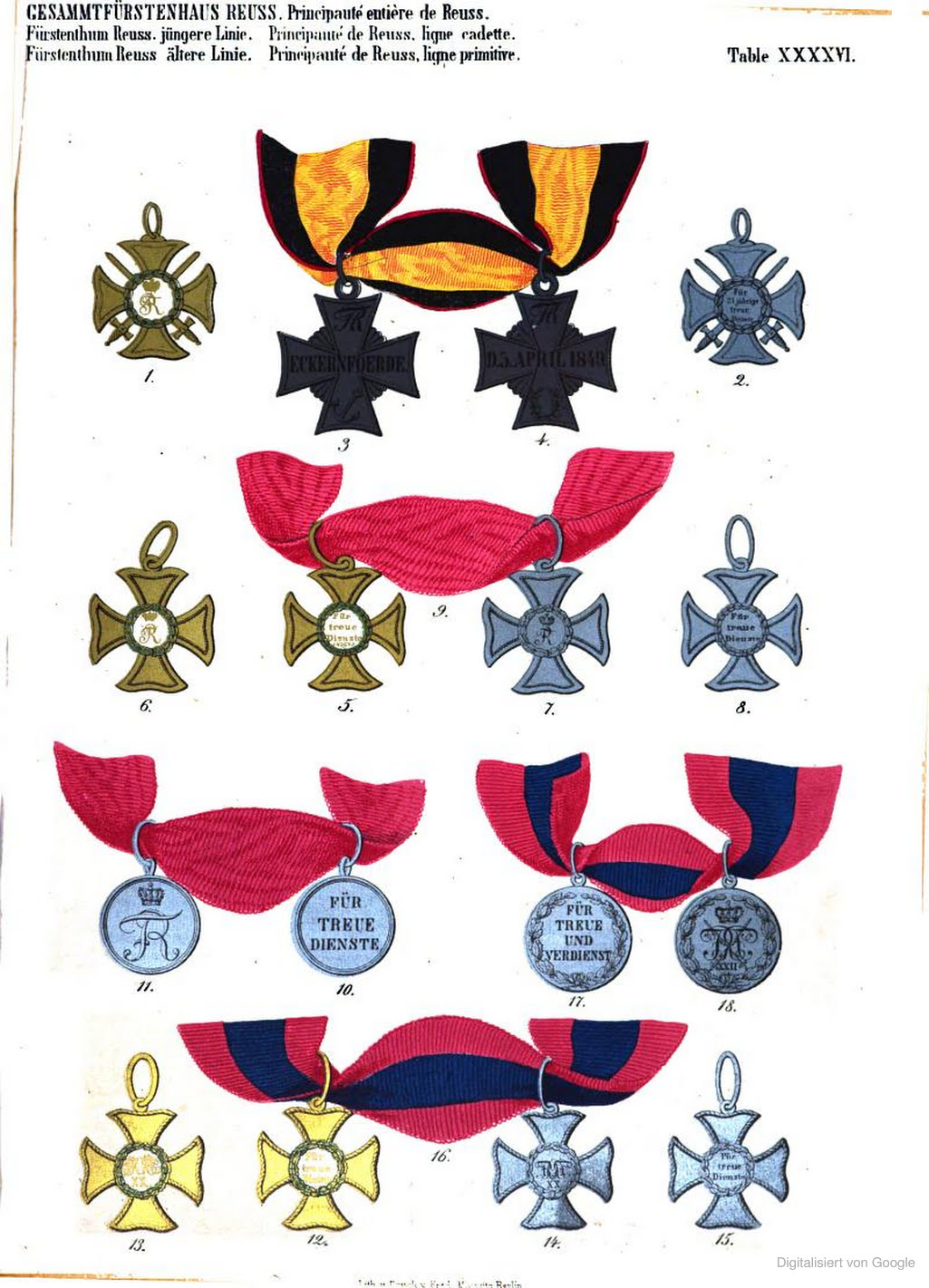
the differences between the Younger line ribbon (top and left) which is shown as red, and the Elder line ribbon (bottom and right) which is blue with a red stripe. on the top is the Reuss Younger line 25-service medal.

The design of the cross or medal depended on the grade. The first class cross was a gold and white enamel cross, suspended from a Necklet, with golden rays between the cross arms and the Reuss coat of arms in gold on red enamel. Dependant on the rank or merit of the recipient, the cross would be suspended from a crown attachment and could come with swords. Between the first and second classes was the officers cross, which was issued in a pinback design similar to the Iron Cross first class. It was the same design as the first class cross but without the rays between cross arms, they could be issued with or without swords. The second class cross was suspended from a ribbon on the recipient's left breast, and similarly to the two classes above it, it was an enamel cross with rays. It could be issued with or without a crown or swords. Occasionally those crosses issued with swords were issued without the golden rays seen on other 2nd class crosses.

The third class cross was of the same basic design as the first and second class crosses. However, the third class cross was silver, and entirely unenamelled except for the centre medallion. It could be issued with a crown and swords. The fourth class cross was similar to the third, in that it was unenamelled. Though unlike the third class, the fourth class lacked the silver rays between crosses and the enamelled centre medallion.

The gold and silver medals were identical in design, bearing the monogram HR (Heinrich Reuss, the name of every male member of the House of Reuss) which was surmounted by a crown with a beaded edge. the reverse bore the text Für Verdienſt (for merit) within a laurel wreath and also had a beaded edge.

== Grades ==
the order was awarded in seven grades, 5 crosses and two medals, which were given out based on rank. they were as of 1909:

- 1st class with crown (Generalleutnants or higher and civil officials of equal rank)
- 1st class (Generalmajors, Obersts and civil officials of equal rank)
- Officer's Cross (Oberstleutnants and civil officials of equal rank)
- 2nd class with or without crown (Majors and civil officials of equal rank)
- 3rd class with crown (Hauptmänner and civil officials of equal rank)
- 3rd class (Leutnants and civil officials of equal rank)
- 4th class with or without crown (lower military and civil officials or other doers of public duties)
- Gold medal with or without crown (non-commissioned officers and civil officials of equal rank)
- Silver medal (enlisted personnel and civil officials of equal rank)

== Notable recipients ==
- Heinrich XIV, Prince Reuss Younger Line (Sovereign and Founder)
- Heinrich XXVII, Prince Reuss Younger Line (Sovereign)
- Leonhard Graf von Blumenthal (1st class with crown)
- Hans von Koester (1st class with crown)
- Prince Friedrich Wilhelm of Prussia (1st class with crown)
- Karl von Plettenberg (1st class with crown)
- Wilhelm Ernst of Saxe-Weimar-Eisenach (1st class with crown)
- Heinrich VII, Prince Reuss of Köstritz (1st class)
- Frederick Francis III (1st class)
- Georg, Crown Prince of Saxony (1st class)
- Karl Ludwig d'Elsa (1st class)
- John Albert of Mecklenburg (1st class)
- Prince Adolf of Schaumburg-Lippe (1st class)
- Hermann von François (2nd class)
- Adolf Heusinger (3rd class)
- Erich Lüdke (3rd class with Swords and Crown)
- Erwin von Witzleben (3rd class with Swords and Crown)
- Adolf von Brauchitsch (3rd class with Crown)
