= Dariusz Miłek =

Polish businessperson

Dariusz Miłek (born 1 February 1968) is a Polish businessman and entrepreneur, ranked the fourth-wealthiest person in Poland by Forbes magazine in 2015. He is the chairman of CCC SA, Poland's largest retail company.

== Life ==
He was born 1 February 1968 in Szczecin, Poland. In 1976, his family moved to Lubin. He now lives in Chrostnik, Poland with his wife and three children.

== Career ==
In 1989, immediately after the fall of Communism in Poland, he started selling shoes under the brand name Miłek.

He founded the shoes company CCC SA in 1999 which is now headquartered in Polkowice, Poland.

== Wealth ==
His net worth was estimated at US$1.06 billion by Forbes magazine in 2016. After the death of Jan Kulczyk in 2015, he is estimated to be the fourth wealthiest person in Poland.

He has also made investments in the new technology of 3D printers and in real estate. In 2009, he purchased Kulczyk's 19th-century palace in Mazovia.

== Awards ==
He received the Entrepreneur of the Year award from Ernst & Young.

He has received the Kisiel Award in the category of entrepreneurship.
