= Bernd von Brauchitsch =

German officer, adjutant to Reichsmarschall Hermann Göring (1911–1974)

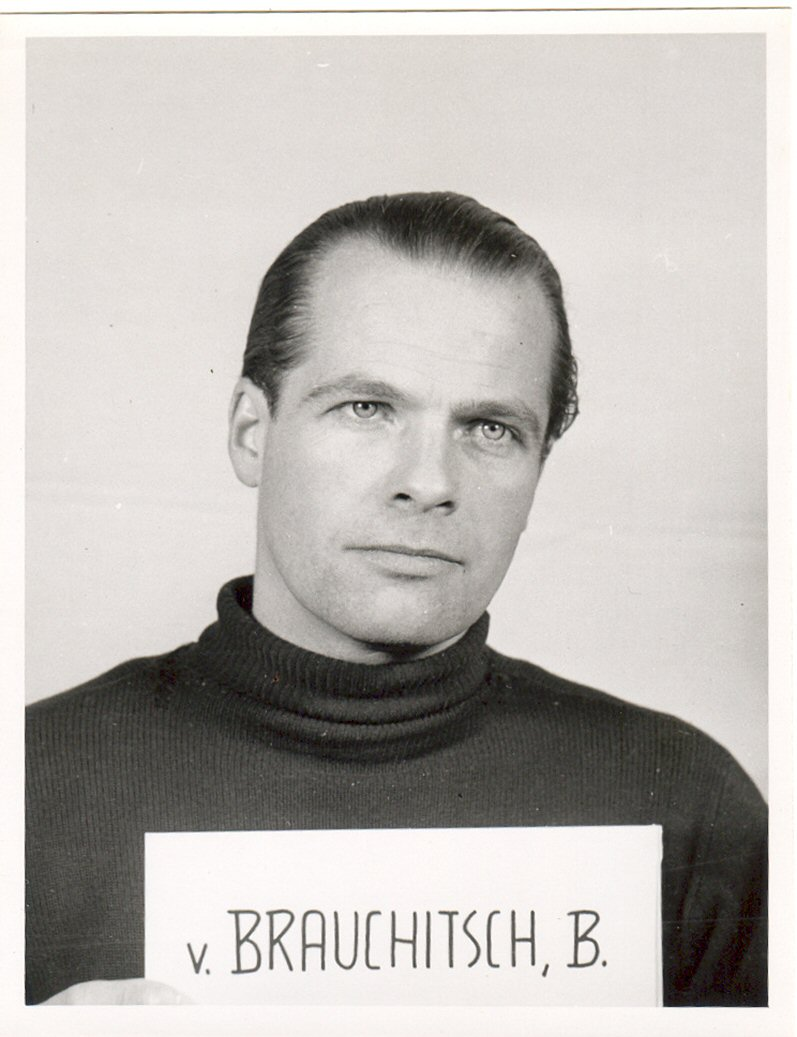
- Brauchitsch at the Nuremberg trials
- Born: Bernd von Brauchitsch; 30 September 1911; German Empire
- Died: 19 December 1974 (aged 63); West Germany
- Children: 1
- Relatives: Walther von Brauchitsch, Adolf von Brauchitsch and Manfred von Brauchitsch
- Military career
- Allegiance: Weimar Republic (to 1933); Nazi Germany (to 1945)
- Rank: Oberst
- Conflicts: World War II
- Awards: Iron Cross 1st Class

Bernd von Brauchitsch (30 September 1911 – 19 December 1974) was a German aristocratic Luftwaffe colonel during World War II and adjutant to Reichsmarschall Hermann Göring.

Born in 1911, as the son of Field Marshal Walther von Brauchitsch, he embarked on a military career. He took part in the invasion of France and the Low Countries, as the commander of a bombing unit. In April 1945, he was arrested together with Göring by the SS on charges of cowardice and betrayal.

After the war, he first served as a witness to major war crimes at the Nuremberg trials, and spent the rest of his life in German steel business, working as managing director of two large Krupp-steel companies.

== Biography ==
=== Early life ===
Brauchitsch was born in 1911 as the eldest son of the future Commander-in-Chief of the Army, Field Marshal Walther von Brauchitsch, and his first wife Elisabeth von Karstedt, a rich heiress in Pomerania.

=== Military career ===
In 1931, Brauchitsch joined the pilot training at the Deutsche Verkehrsfliegerschule (German Air Transport School) at Schleißheim. He and 29 other trainees attended what was called Kameradschaft 31 (camaraderie of 1931), abbreviated "K 31". Among the members of "K 31" were future Luftwaffe staff officers Günther Lützow, Wolfgang Falck, Günther Radusch and Hannes Trautloft. In 1932, he joined a cavalry regiment of the army, and in 1934 was promoted to lieutenant. In the same year, he transferred to the air force. He first served as a pilot at the Test Center in Rechlin, and from 1935, as a technical officer in a Stukastaffel. In 1936, he was promoted to first lieutenant and was transferred to a Stukagruppe, in Lübeck. In December that year he was promoted to squadron commander of a Stukastaffel. In 1939, he attended the air war academy in Gatow. Also, he served as an aide to the Supreme Commander of the air force, Hermann Göring. Later that year, he was promoted to captain.

=== World War II ===
In the Second World War, from May to August 1940, Brauchitsch was employed as group commander of a dive bomber unit during the lightning campaign against France and the Low Countries. In 1941, he worked with the General Staff, and by the end of 1941, he was appointed chief adjutant to Göring. In 1942, he was promoted to major, in 1943, to lieutenant colonel, and in 1944, to colonel. Also in 1944, he was awarded the Pilot and Observer Badge, by Göring, in gold and diamonds. He was arrested in late April 1945 by the SS, together with Göring, at Berchtesgaden. The SS had orders to shoot Göring, but for some reason decided not to.

In May 1945, Brauchitsch, in accordance with Göring's orders, approached the 36th U.S. Division of the 7th American Army, as a negotiator. As a representative of Göring, he informed the Americans that Göring believed the war was over, and he was ready to surrender. Brauchitsch was then held in captivity, from which he was released in 1948 (the same year his father died). In March 1946, he was interrogated at the Nuremberg Trials as a witness to major war crimes as well as his own personal experience of Göring and top Nazi chieftains.

=== Later life ===
In the postwar period, Brauchitsch worked as a manager of the Nord-Westdeutsche Bau- u. Montage GmbH, and since 1956, as a member of the board, set up by the Krupp steel barons and brothers, Berthold and Harald. In 1961, he became managing director of the sister company WASAG. He was also Chairman of the National Association of Schleswig-Holstein Employers Organizations, the employers' association for the chemical industry and plastics processing in Schleswig-Holstein. In addition, he served on the board of the Confederation of German Employers' Associations.

Brauchitsch died in December 1974.
