= Knight's Cross =

Grade of various military orders

Knight's Cross (German language Ritterkreuz) refers to a distinguishing grade or level of various orders that often denotes bravery and leadership on the battlefield.

Most frequently the term Knight's Cross is used to refer to the Knight's Cross of the Iron Cross, a military decoration of Nazi Germany. However, numerous orders have a Knight's Cross grade. Examples include the Cross of Merit on the ribbon of the Bundesverdienstkreuz, the French Chevalier (Knight) of the Légion d'honneur, a grade of the War Merit Cross, the Knight's Cross of the Brandenburg Bailiwick of the Knights' Order of the Hospital of St John in Jerusalem, the Knight's Cross of the Order of Franz Joseph, the Knight's Cross of the Military Order of Maria Theresa, 1st class (Knight) of the Order of the Sun, and the Knight's Cross of the House Order of Hohenzollern.

The five classes wearing their respective insignia (gentlemen) of the Légion d'honneur: 1 - Chevalier; 2 - Officier; 3 - Commandeur; 4 - Grand Officier; 5 - Grand Croix.
