= Blitzkrieg =

Military strategy pioneered by Nazi Germany

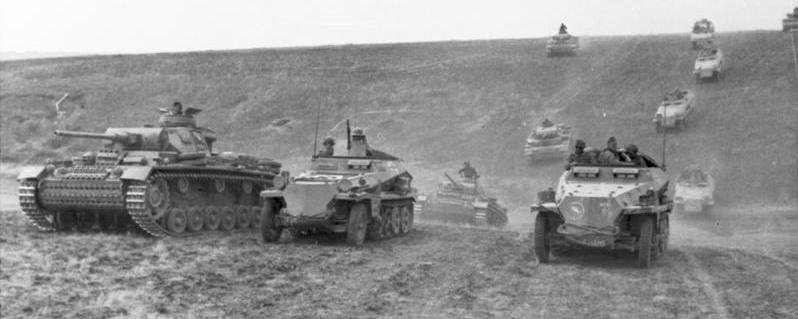
Tanks and mechanised infantry of the 24th Panzer Division advancing through Ukraine, June 1942, typifying fast-moving combined arms blitzkrieg tactics

Blitzkrieg (Note: /ˈblɪtskriːɡ/ BLITS-kreeg, German: [ˈblɪtskʁiːk]; from Blitz "lightning" and Krieg "war". Also known as Bewegungskrieg.) (lit. 'Lightning Warfare') is a German term used to describe a combined arms surprise attack, using a rapid, overwhelming force concentration that may consist of armored and motorized or mechanized infantry formations, together with artillery, air assault, and close air support. The intent is to break through an opponent's lines of defense, dislocate the defenders, confuse the enemy by making it difficult to respond to the continuously changing front, and defeat them in a decisive Vernichtungsschlacht: a battle of annihilation.

During the interwar period, aircraft and tank technologies matured and were combined with the systematic application of the traditional German tactic of Bewegungskrieg (maneuver warfare), involving the deep penetrations and the bypassing of enemy strong points to encircle and destroy opposing forces in a Kesselschlacht (cauldron battle/battle of encirclement). During the invasion of Poland, Western journalists adopted the term blitzkrieg to describe that form of armored warfare. The term had appeared in 1935, in the German military periodical Deutsche Wehr ("German Defence"), in connection to quick or lightning warfare.

German maneuver operations were successful during the campaigns of 1939–1941, involving the invasions of Belgium, the Netherlands, and France and, by 1940, the term blitzkrieg was being extensively used in Western media. Blitzkrieg operations capitalised on surprise penetrations, such as that in the Ardennes forest, the Allies' general lack of preparedness, and their inability to match the pace of the German attack. During the Battle of France, the French made attempts to reform defensive lines along rivers but were frustrated when German forces arrived first and pressed on.

Despite being common in German and English-language journalism during World War II, the word Blitzkrieg was never used as an official military term by the Wehrmacht, except for propaganda, and it was never officially adopted as a concept or doctrine. (Note: Some of the historians that have addressed the misconception of the originality and formalisation of blitzkrieg in their works are: Shimon Naveh (Naveh 1997, pp. 107–108), John Paret (Paret, Craig & Gilbert 1986, p. 587), Karl-Heinz Frieser (Frieser 2005, pp. 28–32), Richard Overy (Overy 1995, pp. 233–235), Mungo Melvin (Melvin 2011, pp. 137), and Steven Mercatante (Mercatante 2012, pp. 4–5).) According to David Reynolds, "Hitler himself called the term Blitzkrieg 'a completely idiotic word' (ein ganz blödsinniges Wort)". Some senior German officers, including Kurt Student, Franz Halder, and Johann Adolf von Kielmansegg, even disputed the idea that it was a military concept. Kielmansegg asserted that what many regarded as blitzkrieg was nothing more than "ad hoc solutions that simply popped out of the prevailing situation". Kurt Student described it as ideas that "naturally emerged from the existing circumstances" as a response to operational challenges.

In 2005, the historian Karl-Heinz Frieser summarized blitzkrieg as the result of German commanders using the latest technology in the most advantageous way, according to traditional military principles, and employing "the right units in the right place at the right time". Modern historians now understand blitzkrieg as the combination of traditional German military principles, methods and doctrines of the 19th century with the military technology of the interwar period. Modern historians use the term casually as a generic description for the style of maneuver warfare practised by Germany during the early part of World War II, rather than as an explanation. (Note: These are some of the many notable historians that have casually used the term blitzkrieg—including some who have written on its misconception—to describe several Wehrmacht military operations that were spearheaded by a dense concentration of armoured and motorised formations with the aim of delivering a breakthrough, and exploiting it with speed to paralyse and encircle the enemy: David Glantz (Glantz 2010, p. 14; Glantz 2009, p. 164; Glantz 2001b), Jonathan House (Glantz & House 1999, pp. 254, 269; Glantz & House 1995, pp. 61, 125, 167, 226, 274, 286, 288), Lloyd Clark (Clark 2012, pp. 22–27, 187), Antony Beevor (Beevor 1999, pp. 13, 148; Beevor 2006, p. 157), Mungo Melvin (Melvin 2011, pp. 46, 79–80, 199), John Erickson (Erickson 2001, pp. 558, 567) and Steven Mercatante (Mercatante 2012, pp. 65, 77, 91, 301).) According to Frieser, in the context of the thinking of Heinz Guderian on mobile combined arms formations, blitzkrieg can be used as a synonym for modern maneuver warfare on the operational level.

== Definition ==
=== Common interpretation ===
The traditional meaning of "blitzkrieg" is that of German tactical and operational methodology during the first half of the Second World War that is often hailed as a new method of warfare. The word, meaning "lightning war" or "lightning attack" in its strategic sense describes a series of quick and decisive short battles to deliver a knockout blow to an enemy state before it can fully mobilize. Tactically, blitzkrieg is a coordinated military effort by tanks, motorized infantry, artillery and aircraft, to create an overwhelming local superiority in combat power, to defeat the opponent and break through its defences. Blitzkrieg as used by Germany had considerable psychological or "terror" elements, (Note: Nothing appeared in Luftwaffe 'doctrine' stipulating "terror" as a major operational factor. The method of "terror", was denied to German aerial operations (and strategic bombing methods) by the Luftwaffe field manual The Conduct of Air Operations, Regulation 16, issued in 1935 (Corum 1992, pp. 167–169). Regulation 16 denied "terror" operations against civilians, and it was not until 1942 when indiscriminate "terror" operations, in which terror and civilian casualties become the primary target, took place (Corum 1997, pp. 7, 143).) such as the Jericho Trompete, a noise-making siren on the Junkers Ju 87 dive bomber, to affect the morale of enemy forces. (Note: As far as the Ju 87 is concerned, it is thought the sirens were suggested to the Junkers company by Ernst Udet to undermine the morale of enemy forces (Griehl 2001, p. 31).) The devices were largely removed when the enemy became used to the noise after the Battle of France in 1940, and instead, bombs sometimes had whistles attached. It is also common for historians and writers to include psychological warfare by using fifth columnists to spread rumours and lies among the civilian population in the theatre of operations.

=== Origin of term ===
The origin of the term blitzkrieg is obscure. It was never used in the title of a military doctrine or handbook of the German Army or Air Force, and no "coherent doctrine" or "unifying concept of blitzkrieg" existed; German High Command mostly referred to the group of tactics as "Bewegungskrieg" (Maneuver Warfare). The term seems to have been rarely used in the German military press before 1939, and recent research at the German Militärgeschichtliches Forschungsamt, at Potsdam, found it in only two military articles from the 1930s. (Note: Those two examples were: von Schwichow, 'Die Ernärungswirtschaft als Wehrproblem', Deutsche Wehr XVIII (39) (2 May 1935), pp. 257–260, and Oberleutnant D. Braun, 'Der strategische Uberfall', Militär-Wochenblatt XVIII (1938), pp. 1134–1136.) Both used the term to mean a swift strategic knockout, rather than a radically new military doctrine or approach to war.

The first article (1935) dealt primarily with supplies of food and materiel in wartime. The term blitzkrieg was used in reference to German efforts to win a quick victory in the First World War but was not associated with the use of armored, mechanized or air forces. It argued that Germany must develop self-sufficiency in food because it might again prove impossible to deal a swift knockout to its enemies, which would lead to a long war.

In the second article (1938), launching a swift strategic knockout was described as an attractive idea for Germany but difficult to achieve on land under modern conditions (especially against systems of fortification like the Maginot Line) unless an exceptionally high degree of surprise could be achieved. The author vaguely suggested that a massive strategic air attack might hold out better prospects, but the topic was not explored in detail.

A third relatively early use of the term in German occurred in Die Deutsche Kriegsstärke (German War Strength) by Fritz Sternberg, a Jewish Marxist political economist and refugee from Nazi Germany, published in 1938 in Paris and in London as Germany and a Lightning War. Sternberg wrote that Germany was not prepared economically for a long war but might win a quick war ("Blitzkrieg"). He did not go into detail about tactics or suggest that the German armed forces had evolved a radically new operational method. His book offered scant clues as to how German lightning victories might be won.

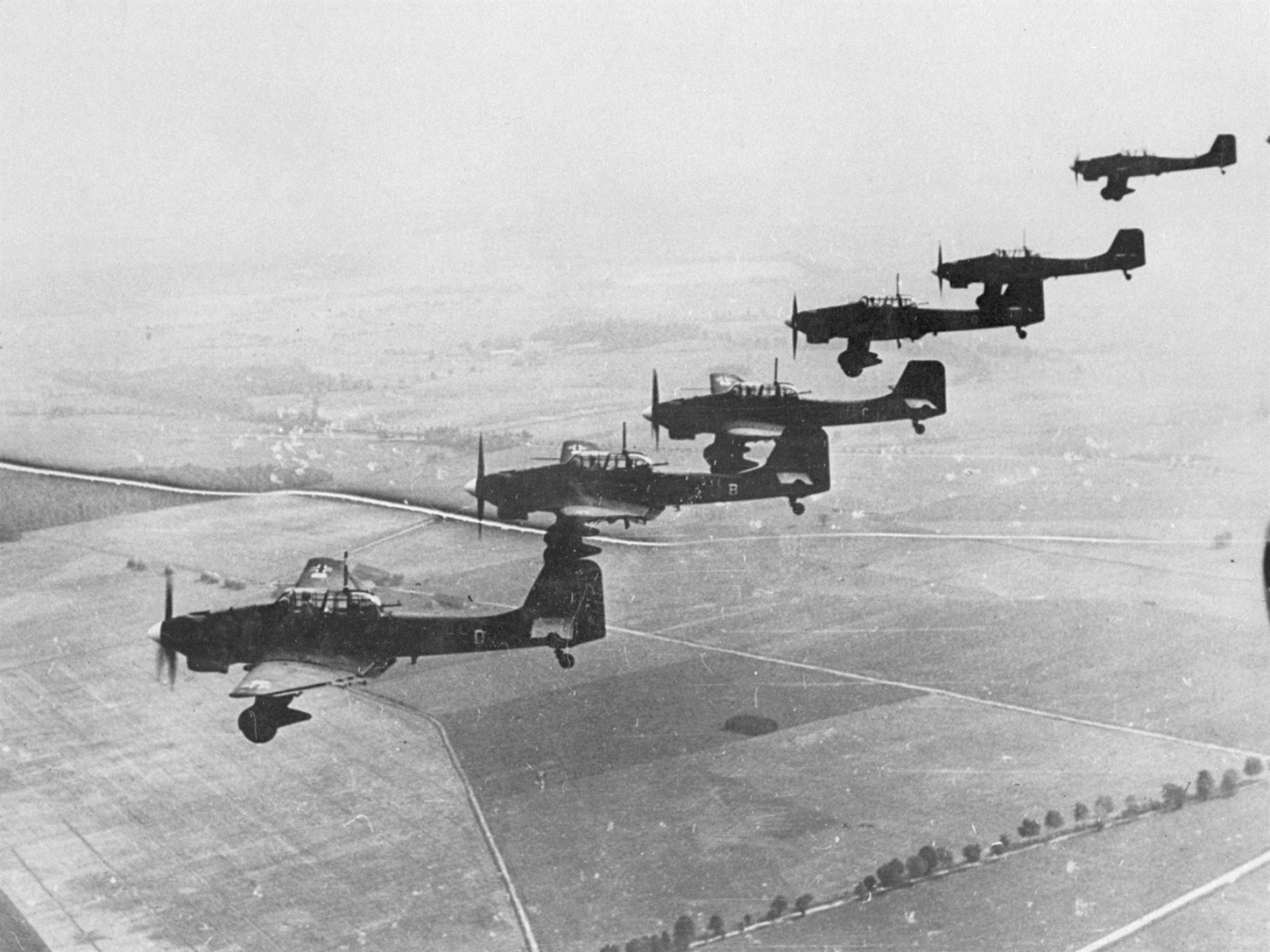
Ju 87 Bs over Poland, September–October 1939

In English and other languages, the term had been used since the 1920s. The term was first used in the publications of Ferdinand Otto Miksche, first in the magazine "Army Quarterly", (Note: See: https://www.deutsche-biographie.de/sfz63329.html) and in his 1941 book Blitzkrieg, in which he defined the concept. In September 1939, Time magazine termed the German military action as a "war of quick penetration and obliteration – Blitzkrieg, lightning war". After the invasion of Poland, the British press commonly used the term to describe German successes in that campaign. J. P. Harris called the term "a piece of journalistic sensationalism – a buzz-word with which to label the spectacular early successes of the Germans in the Second World War". The word was later applied to the bombing of Britain, particularly London, and was nicknamed "The Blitz" in English.

The German popular press followed suit nine months later, after the Fall of France in 1940; thus, although the word had first been used in Germany, it was popularized by British journalism. Heinz Guderian referred to it as a word coined by the Allies: "as a result of the successes of our rapid campaigns our enemies ... coined the word Blitzkrieg". After the German failure in the Soviet Union in 1941, the use of the term began to be frowned upon in Nazi Germany, and Hitler then denied ever using the term and said in a speech in November 1941, "I have never used the word Blitzkrieg, because it is a very silly word". In early January 1942, Hitler dismissed it as "Italian phraseology".

== Military evolution, 1919–1939 ==
=== Germany ===
In 1914, German strategic thinking derived from the writings of Carl von Clausewitz (1 June 1780 – 16 November 1831), Helmuth von Moltke the Elder (26 October 1800 – 24 April 1891) and Alfred von Schlieffen (28 February 1833 – 4 January 1913), who advocated maneuver, mass and envelopment to create the conditions for a decisive battle (Vernichtungsschlacht). During the war, officers such as Willy Rohr developed tactics to restore maneuver on the battlefield. Specialist light infantry (Stosstruppen, "storm troops") were to exploit weak spots to make gaps for larger infantry units to advance with heavier weapons, exploit the success and leave isolated strong points to the troops that were following up. Infiltration tactics were combined with short hurricane artillery bombardments, which used massed artillery. Devised by Colonel Georg Bruchmüller, the attacks relied on speed and surprise, rather than on weight of numbers. The tactics met with great success in Operation Michael, the German spring offensive of 1918 and restored temporarily the war of movement once the Allied trench system had been overrun. The German armies pushed on towards Amiens and then Paris and came within 120 kilometres (75 mi) before supply deficiencies and Allied reinforcements halted the advance.

The historian James Corum criticised the German leadership for failing to understand the technical advances of the First World War, conducting no studies of the machine gun prior to the war and giving tank production the lowest priority during the war. After Germany's defeat, the Treaty of Versailles limited the Reichswehr to a maximum of 100,000 men, which prevented the deployment of mass armies. The German General Staff was abolished by the treaty but continued covertly as the Truppenamt (Troop Office) and was disguised as an administrative body. Committees of veteran staff officers were formed within the Truppenamt to evaluate 57 issues of the war to revise German operational theories. By the time of the Second World War, their reports had led to doctrinal and training publications, including H. Dv. 487, Führung und Gefecht der verbundenen Waffen ("Command and Battle of the Combined Arms)", known as Das Fug (1921–1923) and Truppenführung (1933–1934), containing standard procedures for combined-arms warfare. The Reichswehr was influenced by its analysis of pre-war German military thought, particularly infiltration tactics since at the end of the war, they had seen some breakthroughs on the Western Front and the maneuver warfare which dominated the Eastern Front.

On the Eastern Front, the war did not bog down into trench warfare since the German and the Russian Armies fought a war of maneuver over thousands of miles, which gave the German leadership unique experience that was unavailable to the trench-bound Western Allies. Studies of operations in the East led to the conclusion that small and coordinated forces possessed more combat power than large uncoordinated forces.

After the war, the Reichswehr expanded and improved infiltration tactics. The commander in chief, Hans von Seeckt, argued that there had been an excessive focus on encirclement and emphasised speed instead. Seeckt inspired a revision of Bewegungskrieg (maneuver warfare) thinking and its associated Auftragstaktik in which the commander expressed his goals to subordinates and gave them discretion in how to achieve them. The governing principle was "the higher the authority, the more general the orders were"; it was the responsibility of the lower echelons to fill in the details. Implementation of higher orders remained within limits that were determined by the training doctrine of an elite officer corps.

Delegation of authority to local commanders increased the tempo of operations, which had great influence on the success of German armies in the early war period. Seeckt, who believed in the Prussian tradition of mobility, developed the German army into a mobile force and advocated technical advances that would lead to a qualitative improvement of its forces and better coordination between motorized infantry, tanks, and planes.

=== Britain ===
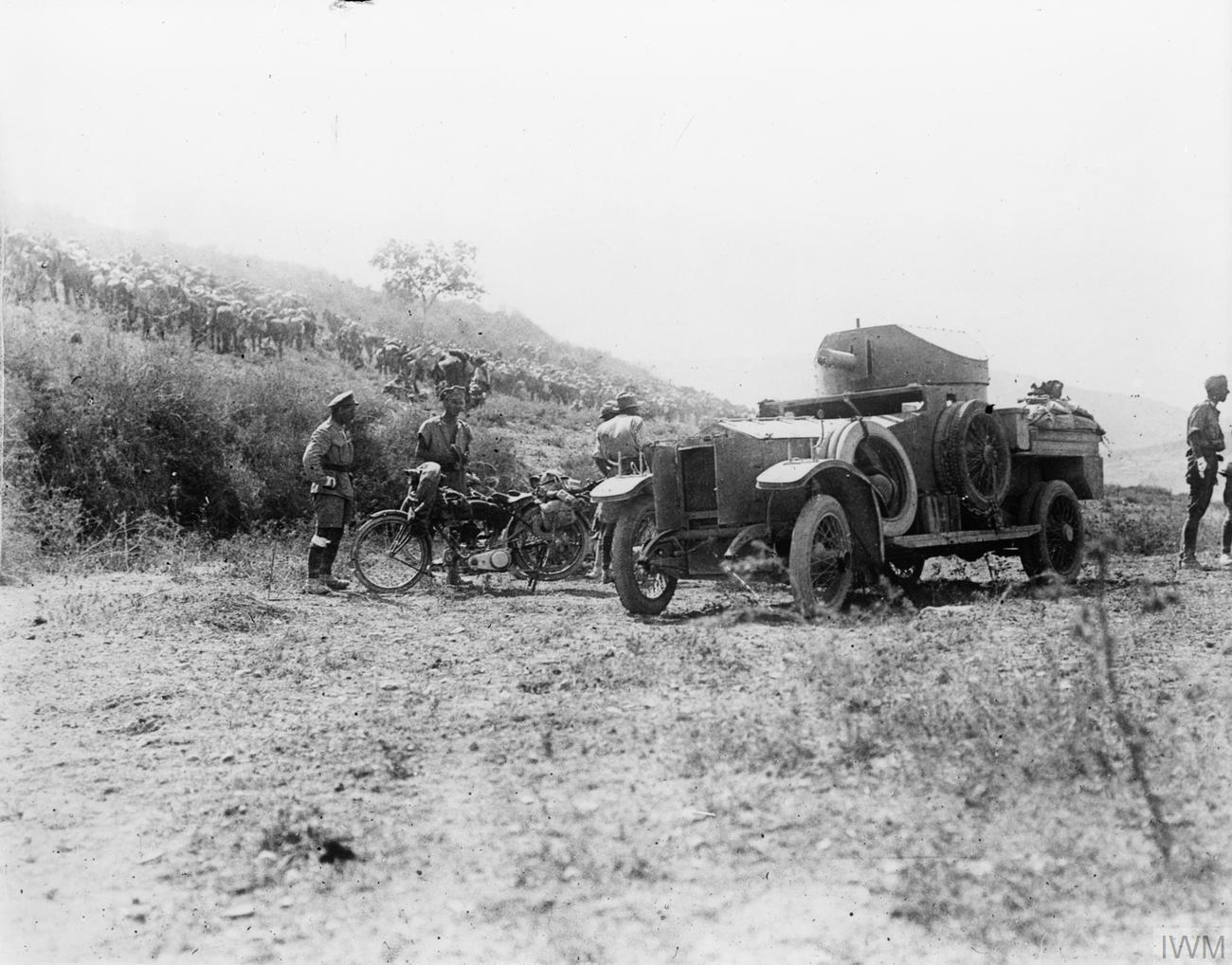
British armoured car and motorcycle at the Battle of Megiddo (1918)

The British Army took lessons from the successful infantry and artillery offensives on the Western Front in late 1918. To obtain the best co-operation between all arms, emphasis was placed on detailed planning, rigid control and adherence to orders. Mechanization of the army, as part of a combined-arms theory of war, was considered a means to avoid mass casualties and the indecisive nature of offensives. The four editions of Field Service Regulations that were published after 1918 held that only combined-arms operations could create enough fire power to enable mobility on a battlefield. That theory of war also emphasised consolidation and recommended caution against overconfidence and ruthless exploitation.

During the Sinai and Palestine campaign, operations involved some aspects of what would later be called blitzkrieg. The decisive Battle of Megiddo included concentration, surprise and speed. Success depended on attacking only in terrain favouring the movement of large formations around the battlefield and tactical improvements in the British artillery and infantry attack. General Edmund Allenby used infantry to attack the strong Ottoman front line in co-operation with supporting artillery, augmented by the guns of two destroyers. Through constant pressure by infantry and cavalry, two Ottoman armies in the Judean Hills were kept off-balance and virtually encircled during the Battles of Sharon and Nablus (Battle of Megiddo).

The British methods induced "strategic paralysis" among the Ottomans and led to their rapid and complete collapse. In an advance of 65 miles (105 km), captures were estimated to be "at least 25,000 prisoners and 260 guns". Liddell Hart considered that important aspects of the operation had been the extent to which Ottoman commanders were denied intelligence on the British preparations for the attack through British air superiority and air attacks on their headquarters and telephone exchanges, which paralyzed attempts to react to the rapidly-deteriorating situation.

=== France ===
Norman Stone detects early blitzkrieg operations in offensives by French Generals Charles Mangin and Marie-Eugène Debeney in 1918. (Note: Now came the riposte – a counter-attack […] from the forest of Villers-Cotterets [...]. The French had developed a light and fast-moving tank. Two generals, Debeney on the British right, and Mangin, to his right, began the tactics that were to become famous in 1940 as Blitzkrieg – tanks, fast-moving infantry, and aircraft flying low to keep the German gunners' heads down. Three hundred tanks (Renault) and eighteen divisions, two of them American, struck in open cornfield, entirely by surprise, and went five miles forward. With the whole of the German force in the Marne salient threatened by a cut-off, Ludendorff pulled back from it, back to Chemin des Dames. By 4 August the French had taken 30,000 prisoners and 600 guns.) However, French doctrine in the interwar years became defence-oriented. Colonel Charles de Gaulle advocated concentration of armor and airplanes. His opinions appeared in his 1934 book Vers l'Armée de métier ("Towards the Professional Army"). Like von Seeckt, de Gaulle concluded that France could no longer maintain the huge armies of conscripts and reservists that had fought the First World War, and he sought to use tanks, mechanized forces and aircraft to allow a smaller number of highly trained soldiers to have greater impact in battle. His views endeared him little to the French high command, but, according to historian Henrik Bering, were studied with great interest by Heinz Guderian.

=== Russia and Soviet Union ===
In 1916, General Alexei Brusilov had used surprise and infiltration tactics during the Brusilov Offensive. Later, Marshal Mikhail Tukhachevsky (1893–1937), Georgii Isserson (1898–1976) and other members of the Red Army developed a concept of deep battle from the experience of the Polish–Soviet War of 1919–1920. Those concepts would guide the Red Army doctrine throughout the Second World War. Realising the limitations of infantry and cavalry, Tukhachevsky advocated mechanized formations and the large-scale industrialisation that they required. Robert Watt (2008) wrote that blitzkrieg has little in common with Soviet deep battle. In 2002, H. P. Willmott had noted that deep battle contained two important differences from blitzkrieg by being a doctrine of total war, not of limited operations, and rejecting decisive battle in favour of several large simultaneous offensives.

The Reichswehr and the Red Army began a secret collaboration in the Soviet Union to evade the Treaty of Versailles occupational agent, the Inter-Allied Commission. In 1926 war games and tests began at Kazan and Lipetsk, in the Soviet Russia. The centers served to field-test aircraft and armored vehicles up to the battalion level and housed aerial- and armoured-warfare schools through which officers rotated.

=== Nazi Germany ===
After becoming Chancellor of Germany in 1933, Adolf Hitler ignored the provisions of the Treaty of Versailles. Within the Wehrmacht, which was established in 1935, the command for motorized armored forces was named the Panzerwaffe in 1936. The Luftwaffe, the German air force, was officially established in February 1935, and development began on ground-attack aircraft and doctrines. Hitler strongly supported the new strategy. He read Guderian's 1937 book Achtung – Panzer! and upon observing armored field exercises at Kummersdorf, he remarked, "That is what I want – and that is what I will have".

==== Guderian ====
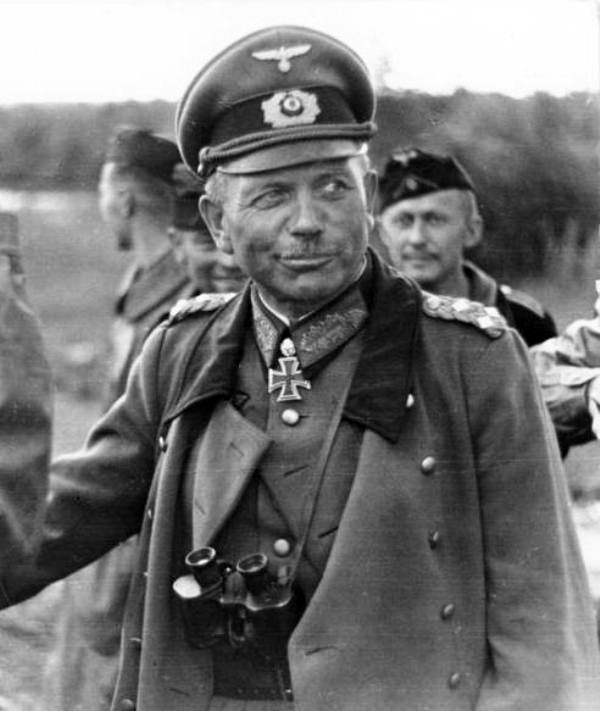
Heinz Guderian

Guderian summarized combined-arms tactics as the way to get the mobile and motorized armored divisions to work together and support each other to achieve decisive success. In his 1950 book, Panzer Leader, he wrote:

In this year, 1929, I became convinced that tanks working on their own or in conjunction with infantry could never achieve decisive importance. My historical studies, the exercises carried out in England and our own experience with mock-ups had persuaded me that the tanks would never be able to produce their full effect until the other weapons on whose support they must inevitably rely were brought up to their standard of speed and of cross-country performance. In such formation of all arms, the tanks must play primary role, the other weapons being subordinated to the requirements of the armor. It would be wrong to include tanks in infantry divisions; what was needed were armored divisions which would include all the supporting arms needed to allow the tanks to fight with full effect.

Guderian believed that developments in technology were required to support the theory, especially by equipping armored divisions, tanks foremost, with wireless communications. Guderian insisted in 1933 to the high command that every tank in the German armored force must be equipped with a radio. At the start of World War II, only the German Army was thus prepared with all tanks being "radio-equipped". That proved critical in early tank battles in which German tank commanders exploited the organizational advantage over the Allies that radio communication gave them.

All Allied armies would later copy that innovation. During the Polish campaign, the performance of armored troops, under the influence of Guderian's ideas, won over a number of skeptics who had initially expressed doubt about armored warfare, such as von Rundstedt and Rommel.

==== Rommel ====
According to David A. Grossman, by the Twelfth Battle of Isonzo (October–November 1917), while he was conducting a light-infantry operation, Rommel had perfected his maneuver-warfare principles, which were the very same ones that were applied during the blitzkrieg against France in 1940 and were repeated in the Coalition ground offensive against Iraq in the 1991 Gulf War. During the Battle of France and against his staff advisor's advice, Hitler ordered that everything should be completed in a few weeks. Fortunately for the Germans, Rommel and Guderian disobeyed the General Staff's orders (particularly those of General Paul Ludwig Ewald von Kleist) and forged ahead making quicker progress than anyone had expected, on the way "inventing the idea of Blitzkrieg".

It was Rommel who created the new archetype of Blitzkrieg by leading his division far ahead of flanking divisions. MacGregor and Williamson remark that Rommel's version of blitzkrieg displayed a significantly better understanding of combined-arms warfare than that of Guderian. General Hermann Hoth submitted an official report in July 1940 which declared that Rommel had "explored new paths in the command of Panzer divisions".

== Methods of operations ==
=== Schwerpunkt ===
Schwerpunktprinzip was a heuristic device (conceptual tool or thinking formula) that was used in the German Army from the nineteenth century to make decisions from tactics to strategy about priority. Schwerpunkt has been translated as center of gravity, crucial, focal point and point of main effort. None of those forms is sufficient to describe the universal importance of the term and the concept of Schwerpunktprinzip. Every unit in the army, from the company to the supreme command, decided on a Schwerpunkt by schwerpunktbildung, as did the support services, which meant that commanders always knew what was the most important and why. The German army was trained to support the Schwerpunkt even when risks had to be taken elsewhere to support the point of main effort and to attack with overwhelming firepower. Schwerpunktbildung allowed the German Army to achieve superiority at the Schwerpunkt, whether attacking or defending, to turn local success at the Schwerpunkt into the progressive disorganisation of the opposing force and to create more opportunities to exploit that advantage even if the Germans were numerically and strategically inferior in general. In the 1930s, Guderian summarized that as Klotzen, nicht kleckern! (roughly "splash, don't spill")

=== Pursuit ===
Having achieved a breakthrough of the enemy's line, units comprising the Schwerpunkt were not supposed to become decisively engaged with enemy front line units to the right and the left of the breakthrough area. Units pouring through the hole were to drive upon set objectives behind the enemy front line. During the Second World War, German Panzer forces used their motorized mobility to paralyze the opponent's ability to react. Fast-moving mobile forces seized the initiative, exploited weaknesses and acted before the opposing forces could respond. Central to that was the decision cycle (tempo). Through superior mobility and faster decision-making cycles, mobile forces could act faster than the forces opposing them.

Directive control was a fast and flexible method of command. Rather than receiving an explicit order, a commander would be told of his superior's intent and the role that his unit was to fill in that concept. The method of execution was then a matter for the discretion of the subordinate commander. The staff burden was reduced at the top and spread among tiers of command with knowledge about their situation. Delegation and the encouragement of initiative aided implementation, and important decisions could be taken quickly and communicated verbally or with only brief written orders.

=== Mopping-up ===
The last part of an offensive operation was the destruction of unsubdued pockets of resistance, which had been enveloped earlier and bypassed by the fast-moving armored and motorized spearheads. The Kesselschlacht ("cauldron battle") was a concentric attack on such pockets. It was there that most losses were inflicted upon the enemy, primarily through the mass capture of prisoners and weapons. During Operation Barbarossa, huge encirclements in 1941 produced nearly 3.5 million Soviet prisoners, along with masses of equipment. (Note: 58 percent of prisoners died through neglect, starvation, or other causes associated with Nazi crimes against Soviet POWs (Glantz & House 1995, p. 57).)

=== Air power ===
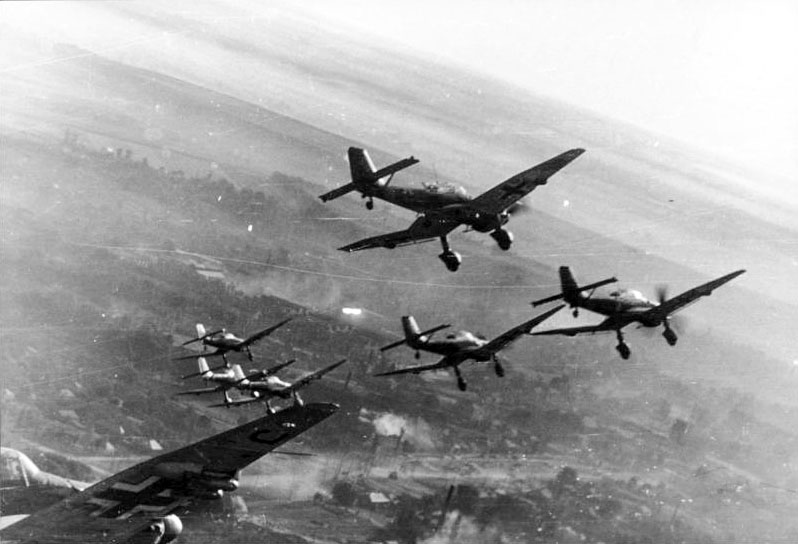
The Ju 87 "Stuka" dive-bomber was used in blitzkrieg operations.

Close air support was provided in the form of the dive bomber and medium bomber, which would support the focal point of attack from the air. German successes are closely related to the extent to which the German Luftwaffe could control the air war in early campaigns in Western and Central Europe and in the Soviet Union. However, the Luftwaffe was a broadly based force with no constricting central doctrine other than its resources should be used generally to support national strategy. It was flexible and could carry out both operational-tactical, and strategic bombing.

Flexibility was the strength of the Luftwaffe in 1939 to 1941. Paradoxically, that became its weakness. While Allied Air Forces were tied to the support of the Army, the Luftwaffe deployed its resources in a more general operational way. It switched from air superiority missions to medium-range interdiction, to strategic strikes to close support duties, depending on the need of the ground forces. In fact, far from it being a specialist panzer spearhead arm, less than 15 percent of the Luftwaffe was intended for close support of the army in 1939.

=== Stimulants ===
Methamphetamine use among troops, especially Temmler's 3 mg Pervitin tablets, likely contributed to the Wehrmacht's blitzkrieg success by enabling synchronized, high-endurance operations with minimal rest.

== Limitations and countermeasures ==
=== Environment ===
The concepts associated with the term blitzkrieg (deep penetrations by armor, large encirclements, and combined arms attacks) were largely dependent upon terrain and weather conditions. Wherever the ability for rapid movement across "tank country" was not possible, armored penetrations often were avoided or resulted in failure. The terrain would ideally be flat, firm, unobstructed by natural barriers or fortifications, and interspersed with roads and railways. If it were instead hilly, wooded, marshy, or urban, armor would be vulnerable to infantry in close-quarters combat and unable to break out at full speed. Additionally, units could be halted by mud (thawing along the Eastern Front regularly slowed both sides) or extreme snow. Operation Barbarossa helped confirm that armor effectiveness and the requisite aerial support depended on weather and terrain. The disadvantages of terrain could be nullified if surprise was achieved over the enemy by an attack in areas that had been considered natural obstacles, as occurred during the Battle of France in which the main German offensive went through the Ardennes. Since the French thought that the Ardennes unsuitable for massive troop movement, particularly for tanks, the area was left with only light defences, which were quickly overrun by the Wehrmacht. The Germans quickly advanced through the forest and knocked down the trees that the French had thought would impede them.

=== Air superiority ===
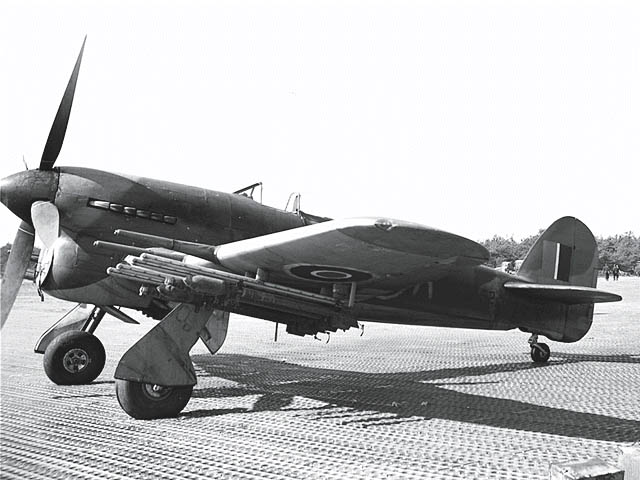
The Hawker Typhoon, especially when armed with eight RP-3 rockets, posed a threat to German armour and motor vehicles during Operation Overlord in 1944.

The influence of air forces over forces on the ground changed significantly over the course of the Second World War. Early German successes were conducted when Allied aircraft could not make a significant impact on the battlefield. In May 1940, there was near parity in numbers of aircraft between the Luftwaffe and the Allies, but the Luftwaffe had been developed to support Germany's ground forces, had liaison officers with the mobile formations and operated a higher number of sorties per aircraft. In addition, the Germans' air parity or superiority allowed the unencumbered movement of ground forces, their unhindered assembly into concentrated attack formations, aerial reconnaissance, aerial resupply of fast moving formations and close air support at the point of attack. The Allied air forces had no close air support aircraft, training or doctrine. The Allies flew 434 French and 160 British sorties a day but methods of attacking ground targets had yet to be developed and so Allied aircraft caused negligible damage. Against the Allies' 600 sorties, the Luftwaffe on average flew 1,500 sorties a day.

On 13 May, Fliegerkorps VIII flew 1,000 sorties in support of the crossing of the Meuse. The following day the Allies made repeated attempts to destroy the German pontoon bridges, but German fighter aircraft, ground fire and Luftwaffe flak batteries with the panzer forces destroyed 56 percent of the attacking Allied aircraft, and the bridges remained intact.

Allied air superiority became a significant hindrance to German operations during the later years of the war. By June 1944, the Western Allies had the complete control of the air over the battlefield, and their fighter-bomber aircraft were very effective at attacking ground forces. On D-Day, the Allies flew 14,500 sorties over the battlefield area alone, not including sorties flown over Northwestern Europe. Against them the Luftwaffe flew some 300 sorties on 6 June. Though German fighter presence over Normandy increased over the next days and weeks, it never approached the numbers that the Allies commanded. Fighter-bomber attacks on German formations made movement during daylight almost impossible.

Subsequently, shortages soon developed in food, fuel and ammunition and severely hampered the German defenders. German vehicle crews and even flak units experienced great difficulty moving during daylight. (Note: The historian H.P. Willmott wrote, "Many examples of the experiences and losses suffered by German formations moving up to the front are well known. Panzer Lehr, for instance, on 7 June alone lost 84 half-tracks, prime movers and self propelled guns, 40 fuel bowsers, 90 soft-skinned vehicles and five tanks as it made its way from Le Mans to Caen.) Indeed, the final German offensive operation in the west, Operation Wacht am Rhein, was planned to take place during poor weather to minimise interference by Allied aircraft. Under those conditions, it was difficult for German commanders to employ the "armored idea", if at all.

=== Counter-tactics ===
Blitzkrieg's structural vulnerability lies in its dependence on the enemy's failure of nerve: the doctrine's operational logic assumes that hostile formations in the defender's rear will produce the disorganization and collapse necessary for encirclement to succeed. Once defenders learned to absorb armored attack without panic—a recalibration historian Robert Citino identifies as the decisive shift in mid-war operational equilibrium—then the age of bold armored thrusts and decisive encirclement gave way to a grinding attritional contest in which the attacker's logistical exposure became a liability. The attacking formation's dependence on sustained momentum—dependent on fuel, spare parts, infantry, and artillery fed continuously into an ever-lengthening spearhead operating, in Citino's phrase, "on a logistical shoestring"—meant that an enemy holding the shoulders of a breach retained the initiative, with the attacker's exposed flanks offering the opportunity to sever the van entirely from its support.

The campaigns of 1940 illustrated both the doctrine's power and the precise conditions under which it could be checked. During the drive across northern France, the panzers were, as Citino observes, "nearly unmolested" — yet de Gaulle's two strikes with the 4th Armoured Division at Montcornet (17 May) and Crécy-sur-Serre (20 May), together with the British armored columns' counterstroke at Arras (21 May), revealed the doctrine's structural exposure: the panzer forces were "like a huge arrow, strung out over a hundred miles of terrain and pointing toward the coast, but only three to five miles wide," wholly out of contact with their follow-on infantry—precisely the vulnerability a more capable opponent might have exploited decisively.

At the Battle of Kursk, the Red Army used a combination of defence in great depth, extensive minefields and tenacious defense of breakthrough shoulders. Forewarned of the German axis of attack, the Stavka resolved to receive Operation Citadel in a deliberately constructed defense of great depth—absorbing German combat power across successive defensive belts rather than contesting the breakthrough at the forward edge—before transitioning to the offensive. German armor advanced, but made progress more through attrition rather than via an exploitation of defensive weakness, but Soviet forces quickly turned the tide. During Operation Bagration (June–August 1944), the Red Army surrounded and effectively annihilated Army Group Center, driving armored spearheads so deep and so quickly that German units had no time to regroup, break out, or form a stable defensive line. By early August, Soviet forces had reached the Vistula and the approaches to East Prussia.

=== Logistics ===
Although effective in quick campaigns against Poland and France, mobile operations could not be sustained by Germany in later years. Strategies based on maneuver have the inherent danger of the attacking force overextending its supply lines and can be defeated by a determined foe who is willing and able to sacrifice territory for time in which to regroup and rearm, as the Soviets did on the Eastern Front, as opposed to, for example, the Dutch, who had no territory to sacrifice. Tank and vehicle production was a constant problem for Germany. Indeed, late in the war, many panzer "divisions" had no more than a few dozen tanks.

As the end of the war approached, Germany also experienced critical shortages in fuel and ammunition stocks as a result of Anglo-American strategic bombing and blockade. Although the production of Luftwaffe fighter aircraft continued, they could not fly because of lack of fuel. What fuel there was went to panzer divisions, and even then, they could not operate normally. Of the Tiger tanks lost against the US Army, nearly half of them were abandoned for lack of fuel.

== Military operations ==
=== Spanish Civil War ===
German volunteers first used armor in live field-conditions during the Spanish Civil War (1936–1939). Armor commitment consisted of Panzer Battalion 88, a force built around three companies of Panzer I tanks that functioned as a training cadre for Spain's Nationalists. The Luftwaffe deployed squadrons of fighters, dive-bombers and transport aircraft as the Condor Legion. Guderian said that the tank deployment was "on too small a scale to allow accurate assessments to be made". (The true test of his "armored idea" would have to wait for the Second World War.) However, the Luftwaffe also provided volunteers to Spain to test both tactics and aircraft in combat, including the first combat use of the Stuka.

During the war, the Condor Legion undertook the 1937 bombing of Guernica, which had a tremendous psychological effect on the populations of Europe. The results were exaggerated, and the Western Allies concluded that the "city-busting" techniques were now part of the German way in war. The targets of the German aircraft were actually the rail lines and bridges, but lacking the ability to hit them with accuracy (only three or four Ju 87s saw action in Spain), the Luftwaffe chose a method of carpet bombing, resulting in heavy civilian casualties.

=== Poland, 1939 ===
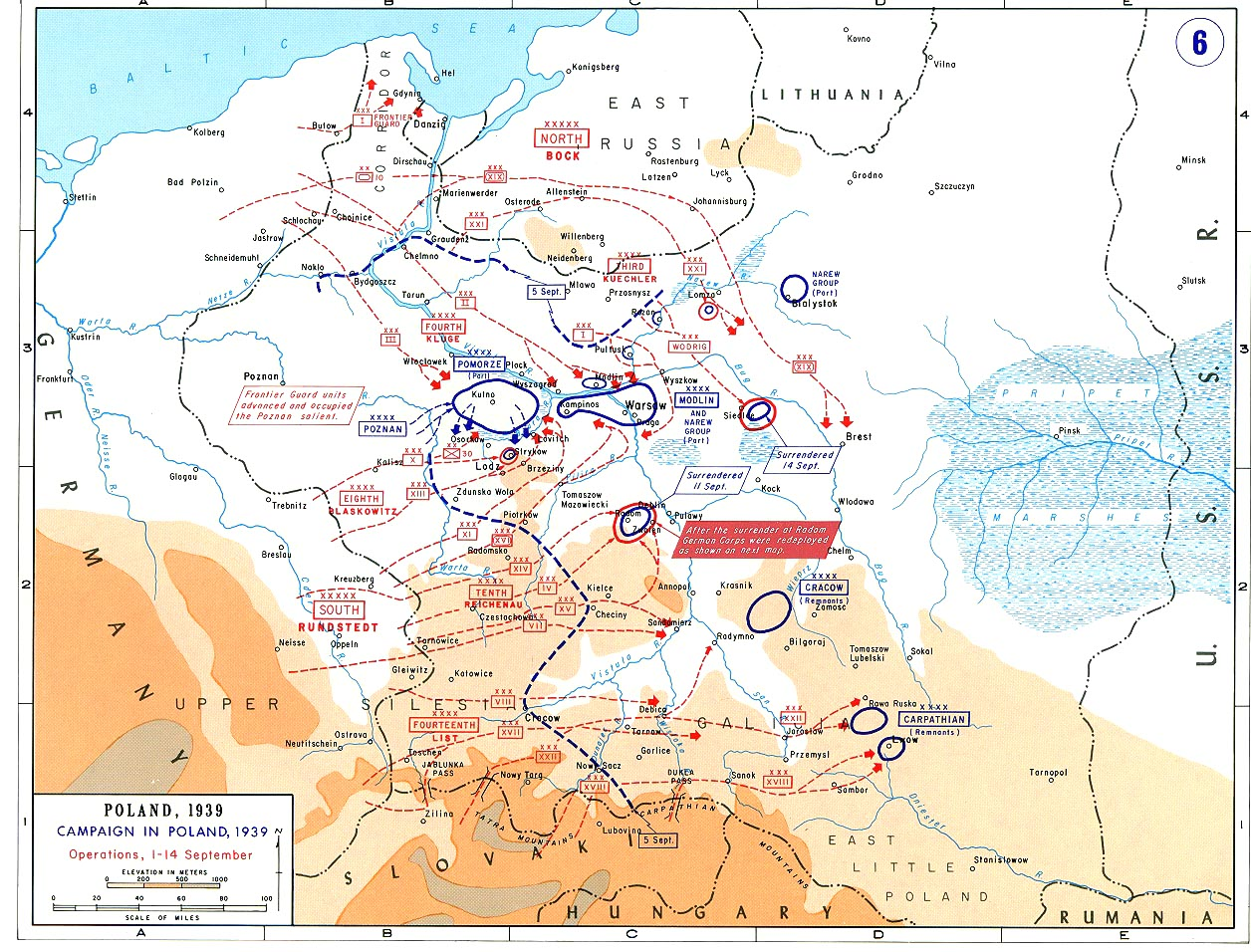
In Poland, fast-moving armies encircled Polish forces (blue circles) but not by independent armored operations. Combined tank, artillery, infantry and air forces were used.

Although journalists popularized the term Blitzkrieg during the September 1939 invasion of Poland, the historians Matthew Cooper and J. P. Harris have written that German operations during the campaign were consistent with traditional methods. The Wehrmacht strategy was more in line with Vernichtungsgedanke, a focus on envelopment to create pockets in broad-front annihilation. The German generals dispersed Panzer forces among the three German concentrations with little emphasis on independent use. They deployed tanks to create or destroy close pockets of Polish forces and to seize operational-depth terrain in support of the largely unmotorized infantry, which followed.

The Wehrmacht used available models of tanks, Stuka dive-bombers and concentrated forces in the Polish campaign, but the majority of the fighting involved conventional infantry and artillery warfare, and most Luftwaffe action was independent of the ground campaign. Matthew Cooper wrote:

Throughout the Polish Campaign, the employment of the mechanised units revealed the idea that they were intended solely to ease the advance and to support the activities of the infantry.... Thus, any strategic exploitation of the armoured idea was still-born. The paralysis of command and the breakdown of morale were not made the ultimate aim of the... German ground and air forces, and were only incidental by-products of the traditional maneuvers of rapid encirclement and of the supporting activities of the flying artillery of the Luftwaffe, both of which had as their purpose the physical destruction of the enemy troops. Such was the Vernichtungsgedanke of the Polish campaign.

John Ellis wrote that "there is considerable justice in Matthew Cooper's assertion that the panzer divisions were not given the kind of strategic mission that was to characterize authentic armored blitzkrieg, and were almost always closely subordinated to the various mass infantry armies". Steven Zaloga wrote, "Whilst Western accounts of the September campaign have stressed the shock value of the panzer and Stuka attacks, they have tended to underestimate the punishing effect of German artillery on Polish units. Mobile and available in significant quantity, artillery shattered as many units as any other branch of the Wehrmacht."

=== Low Countries and France, 1940 ===
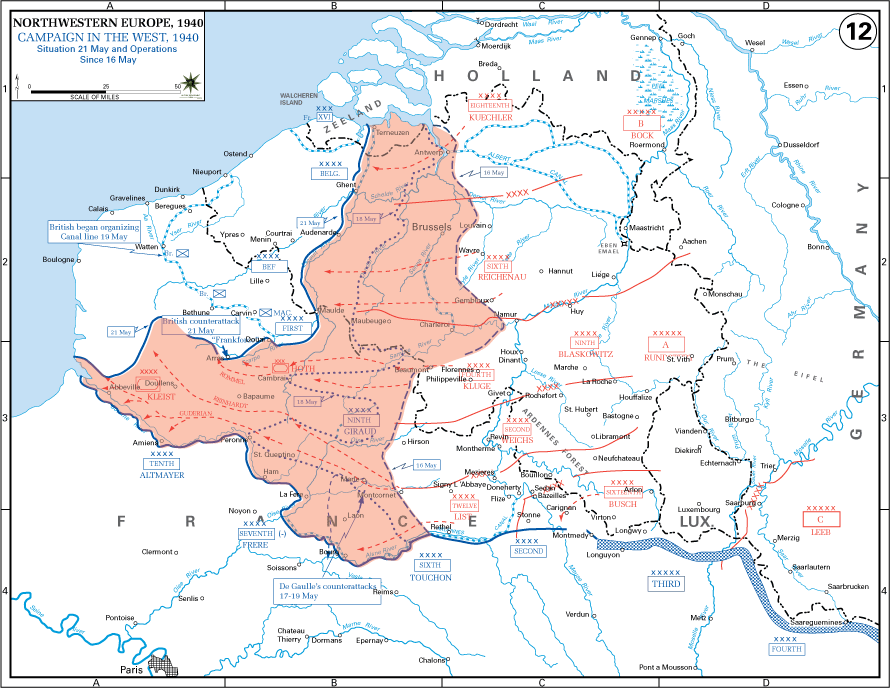
German advances during the Battle of Belgium

The German invasion of France, with subsidiary attacks on Belgium and the Netherlands, consisted of two phases, Operation Yellow (Fall Gelb) and Operation Red (Fall Rot). Yellow opened with a feint conducted against the Netherlands and Belgium by two armored corps and paratroopers. Most of the German armored forces were placed in Panzer Group Kleist, which attacked through the Ardennes, a lightly defended sector that the French planned to reinforce if necessary before the Germans could bring up heavy and siege artillery. (Note: General Alphonse Joseph Georges wrote, "Crediting our enemies with our own procedure we had imagined that they would not attempt the passage of the Meuse until after they had brought up ample artillery. The five or six days necessary for that would have easily given us time to reinforce our own dispositions" (Liddell Hart 1970, p. 73).) There was no time for the French to send such reinforcement, as the Germans did not wait for siege artillery but reached the Meuse and achieved a breakthrough at the Battle of Sedan in three days.

Panzer Group Kleist raced to the English Channel, reached the coast at Abbeville and cut off the BEF, the Belgian Army and some of the best-equipped divisions of the French Army in northern France. Armored and motorized units under Guderian, Rommel and others advanced far beyond the marching and horse-drawn infantry divisions and far in excess of what Hitler and the German high command had expected or wished. When the Allies counter-attacked at Arras by using the heavily armored British Matilda I and Matilda II tanks, a brief panic ensued in the German High Command.

Hitler halted his armored and motorized forces outside the port of Dunkirk, which the Royal Navy had started using to evacuate the Allied forces. Hermann Göring promised that the Luftwaffe would complete the destruction of the encircled armies, but aerial operations failed to prevent the evacuation of the majority of the Allied troops. In Operation Dynamo, some 330,000 French and British troops escaped.

Case Yellow surprised everyone by overcoming the Allies' 4,000 armored vehicles, many of which were better than their German equivalents in armor and gunpower. The French and British frequently used their tanks in the dispersed role of infantry support, rather than by concentrating force at the point of attack, to create overwhelming firepower.

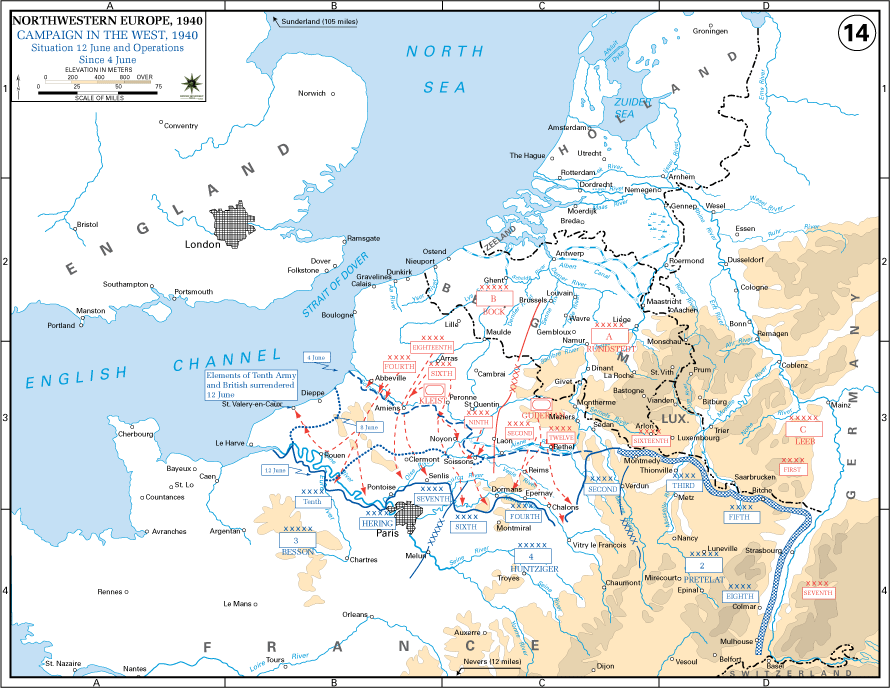
German advances during the Battle of France

The French armies were much reduced in strength and the confidence of their commanders shaken. With much of their own armor and heavy equipment lost in Northern France, they lacked the means to fight a mobile war. The Germans followed their initial success with Operation Red, a triple-pronged offensive. The XV Panzer Corps attacked towards Brest, XIV Panzer Corps attacked east of Paris, towards Lyon and the XIX Panzer Corps encircled the Maginot Line. The French, hard pressed to organise any sort of counter-attack, were continually ordered to form new defensive lines and found that German forces had already bypassed them and moved on. An armored counter-attack, organized by Colonel Charles de Gaulle, could not be sustained, and he had to retreat.

Prior to the German offensive in May, Winston Churchill had said, "Thank God for the French Army". The same French Army collapsed after barely two months of fighting. That was in shocking contrast to the four years of trench warfare on which French forces had engaged during the First World War. French Prime Minister Paul Reynaud, analyzed the collapse in a speech on 21 May 1940:

The truth is that our classic conception of the conduct of war has come up against a new conception. At the basis of this... there is not only the massive use of heavy armoured divisions or cooperation between them and airplanes, but the creation of disorder in the enemy's rear by means of parachute raids.

The Germans had not used paratroopry attacks in France and made only one large drop in the Netherlands to capture three bridges; some small glider-landings were conducted in Belgium to take bottlenecks on routes of advance before the arrival of the main force (the most renowned being the landing on Fort Eben-Emael in Belgium).

=== Eastern Front, 1941–1944 ===
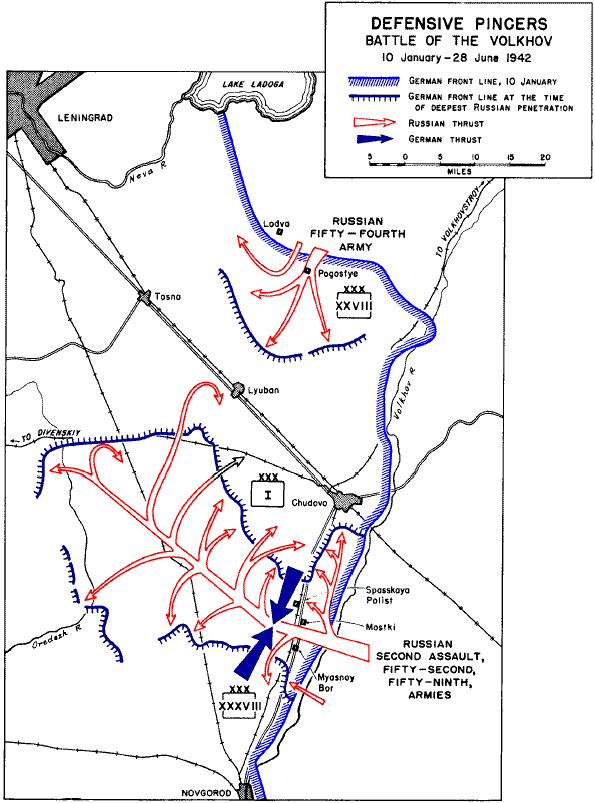
After 1941–1942, the Wehrmacht increasingly used armoured formations as a mobile reserve against Allied breakthroughs. The blue arrows depict armoured counter-attacks.

Use of armored forces was crucial for both sides on the Eastern Front. Operation Barbarossa, the German invasion of the Soviet Union in June 1941, involved a number of breakthroughs and encirclements by motorized forces. Its goal, according to Führer Directive 21 (18 December 1940), was "to destroy the Russian forces deployed in the West and to prevent their escape into the wide-open spaces of Russia". The Red Army was to be destroyed west of the Dvina and Dnieper rivers, which were about 500 kilometres (310 mi) east of the Soviet border, to be followed by a mopping-up operation. The surprise attack resulted in the near annihilation of the Voyenno-Vozdushnye Sily (VVS, Soviet Air Force) by simultaneous attacks on airfields, allowing the Luftwaffe to achieve total air supremacy over all the battlefields within the first week. On the ground, four German panzer groups outflanked and encircled disorganized Red Army units, and the marching infantry completed the encirclements and defeated the trapped forces. In late July, after 2nd Panzer Group (commanded by Guderian) captured the watersheds of the Dvina and Dnieper rivers near Smolensk, the panzers had to defend the encirclement, because the marching infantry divisions remained hundreds of kilometers to the west.

The Germans conquered large areas of the Soviet Union, but their failure to destroy the Red Army before the winter of 1941–1942 was a strategic failure and made German tactical superiority and territorial gains irrelevant. The Red Army had survived enormous losses and regrouped with new formations far to the rear of the front line. During the Battle of Moscow (October 1941 to January 1942), the Red Army defeated the German Army Group Center and for the first time in the war seized the strategic initiative.

In the summer of 1942, Germany launched another offensive and this time focusing on Stalingrad and the Caucasus in the southern Soviet Union. The Soviets again lost tremendous amounts of territory, only to counter-attack once more during winter. The German gains were ultimately limited because Hitler diverted forces from the attack on Stalingrad and drove towards the Caucasus oilfields simultaneously. The Wehrmacht became overstretched. Although it won operationally, it could not inflict a decisive defeat as the durability of the Soviet Union's manpower, resources, industrial base and aid from the Western Allies began to take effect.

In July 1943, the Wehrmacht conducted Operation Zitadelle (Citadel) against a salient at Kursk, which Soviet troop heavily defended. Soviet defensive tactics had by now hugely improved, particularly in the use of artillery and air support. By April 1943, the Stavka had learned of German intentions through intelligence supplied by front-line reconnaissance and Ultra intercepts. In the following months, the Red Army constructed deep defensive belts along the paths of the planned German attack. The Soviets made a concerted effort to disguise their knowledge of German plans and the extent of their own defensive preparations, and the German commanders still hoped to achieve operational surprise when the attack commenced.

The Germans did not achieve surprise and could not outflank or break through into enemy rear areas during the operation. Several historians assert that Operation Citadel was planned and intended to be a blitzkrieg operation. (Note: Some of the military historians who consider Operation Citadel, or at least the southern pincer, as envisioning a blitzkrieg attack or state it was intended as such are: Lloyd Clark (Clark 2012, p. 187), Roger Moorhouse (Moorhouse 2011, p. 342), Mary Kathryn Barbier (Barbier 2002, p. 10), David Glantz (; Glantz & House 2004, pp. 63, 78, 149, 269, 272, 280), Jonathan House (Glantz & House 2004, pp. 63, 78, 149, 269, 272, 280), Hedley Paul Willmott (Willmott 1990, p. 300), Oscar Pinkus (Pinkus 2005, p. 35) and others.) Many of the German participants who wrote about the operation after the war, including Erich von Manstein, make no mention of blitzkrieg in their accounts. (Note: Many of the German participants of Operation Citadel made no mention of blitzkrieg in their characterisation of the operation. Several German officers and commanders involved in the operation wrote their account of the battle after the war, and some of these postwar accounts were collected by the US Army. Some of these officers are: Theodor Busse (Newton 2002, pp. 3–27), Erhard Raus (Newton 2002, pp. 29–64), Friedrich Fangohr (Newton 2002, pp. 65–96), Peter von der Groeben (Newton 2002, pp. 97–144), Friedrich Wilhelm von Mellenthin (Mellenthin 1956, pp. 212–234), Erich von Manstein (Manstein 1983, pp. 443–449), and others.) In 2000, Niklas Zetterling and Anders Frankson characterised only the southern pincer of the German offensive as a "classical blitzkrieg attack". Pier Battistelli wrote that the operational planning marked a change in German offensive thinking away from blitzkrieg and that more priority was given to brute force and fire power than to speed and maneuver.

In 1995, David Glantz stated that blitzkrieg was at Kursk for the first time defeated in summer, and the opposing Soviet forces mounted a successful counter-offensive. The Battle of Kursk ended with two Soviet counter-offensives and the revival of deep operations. In the summer of 1944, the Red Army destroyed Army Group Centre in Operation Bagration by using combined-arms tactics for armor, infantry and air power in a coordinated strategic assault, known as deep operations, which led to an advance of 600 kilometres (370 mi) in six weeks.

=== Western Front, 1944–1945 ===
Allied armies began using combined-arms formations and deep-penetration strategies that Germany had used in the opening years of the war. Many Allied operations in the Western Desert and on the Eastern Front, relied on firepower to establish breakthroughs by fast-moving armored units. The artillery-based tactics were also decisive in Western Front operations after 1944's Operation Overlord, and the British Commonwealth and American armies developed flexible and powerful systems for using artillery support. What the Soviets lacked in flexibility, they made up for in number of rocket launchers, guns and mortars. The Germans never achieved the kind of fire concentrations that their enemies were achieving 1944.

After the Allied landings in Normandy (June 1944), the Germans began a counter-offensive to overwhelm the landing force with armored attacks, but they failed because of a lack of co-ordination and to Allied superiority in anti-tank defense and in the air. The most notable attempt to use deep-penetration operations in Normandy was Operation Luttich at Mortain, which only hastened the Falaise Pocket and the destruction of German forces in Normandy. The Mortain counter-attack was defeated by the American 12th Army Group with little effect on its own offensive operations.

The last German offensive on the Western front, the Battle of the Bulge (Operation Wacht am Rhein), was an offensive launched towards the port of Antwerp in December 1944. Launched in poor weather against a thinly-held Allied sector, it achieved surprise and initial success as Allied air-power was grounded due to cloud cover. Determined defense by American troops in places throughout the Ardennes, the lack of good roads and German supply shortages caused delays. Allied forces deployed to the flanks of the German penetration, and as soon as the skies cleared, Allied aircraft returned to the battlefield. Allied counter-attacks soon forced back the Germans, who abandoned much equipment for lack of fuel.

== Post-war controversy ==
Blitzkrieg had been called a Revolution in Military Affairs (RMA), but many writers and historians have concluded that the Germans did not invent a new form of warfare but applied new technologies to traditional ideas of Bewegungskrieg (maneuver warfare) to achieve decisive victory.

=== Strategy ===
In 1965, Captain Robert O'Neill, Professor of the History of War at the University of Oxford produced an example of the popular view. In Doctrine and Training in the German Army 1919–1939, O'Neill wrote:

What makes this story worth telling is the development of one idea: the blitzkrieg. The German Army had a greater grasp of the effects of technology on the battlefield, and went on to develop a new form of warfare by which its rivals when it came to the test were hopelessly outclassed.

Other historians wrote that blitzkrieg was an operational doctrine of the German armed forces and a strategic concept on which the leadership of Nazi Germany based its strategic and economic planning. Military planners and bureaucrats in the war economy appear rarely, if ever, to have employed the term blitzkrieg in official documents. That the German army had a "blitzkrieg doctrine" was rejected in the late 1970s by Matthew Cooper. The concept of a blitzkrieg Luftwaffe was challenged by Richard Overy in the late 1970s and by Williamson Murray in the mid-1980s. That Nazi Germany went to war on the basis of "blitzkrieg economics" was criticized by Richard Overy in the 1980s, and George Raudzens described the contradictory senses in which historians have used the word. The notion of a German blitzkrieg concept or doctrine survives in popular history and many historians still support the thesis.

Frieser wrote that after the failure of the Schlieffen Plan in 1914, the German army concluded that decisive battles were no longer possible in the changed conditions of the twentieth century. Frieser wrote that the Oberkommando der Wehrmacht (OKW), which was created in 1938 had intended to avoid the decisive battle concepts of its predecessors and planned for a long war of exhaustion (Ermattungskrieg). It was only after the improvised plan for the Battle of France in 1940 was unexpectedly successful that the German General Staff came to believe that Vernichtungskrieg was still feasible. German thinking reverted to the possibility of a quick and decisive war for the Balkan campaign and Operation Barbarossa.

=== Doctrine ===
Most academic historians regard the notion of blitzkrieg as military doctrine to be a myth. Shimon Naveh wrote, "The striking feature of the blitzkrieg concept is the complete absence of a coherent theory which should have served as the general cognitive basis for the actual conduct of operations". Naveh described it as an "ad hoc solution" to operational dangers, thrown together at the last moment. Overy disagreed with the idea that Hitler and the Nazi regime ever intended a blitzkrieg war because the once-popular belief that the Nazi state organized its economy to carry out its grand strategy in short campaigns was false. Hitler had intended for a rapid unlimited war to occur much later than 1939, but Germany's aggressive foreign policy forced the state into war before it was ready. The planning of Hitler and the Wehrmacht in the 1930s did not reflect a blitzkrieg method but the opposite. J. P. Harris wrote that the Wehrmacht never used the word, and it did not appear in German army or air force field manuals. The word was coined in September 1939 by a Times newspaper reporter. Harris also found no evidence that German military thinking developed a blitzkrieg mentality. Karl-Heinz Frieser and Adam Tooze reached similar conclusions to Overy and Naveh that the notions of blitzkrieg economy and strategy are myths. Frieser wrote that surviving German economists and General Staff officers denied that Germany went to war with a blitzkrieg strategy. Robert M. Citino argues:

Blitzkrieg was not a doctrine, or an operational scheme, or even a tactical system. In fact, it simply doesn't exist, at least not in the way we usually think it does. The Germans never used the term Blitzkrieg in any precise sense, and almost never used it outside of quotations. It simply meant a rapid and decisive victory (lightning war)... The Germans didn't invent anything new in the interwar period, but rather used new technologies like tanks and air and radio-controlled command to restore an old way of war that they still found to be valid, Bewegungskrieg.

Historian Victor Davis Hanson states that Blitzkrieg "played on the myth of German technological superiority and industrial dominance" and adds that German successes, particularly that of its Panzer divisions were "instead predicated on the poor preparation and morale of Germany's enemies". Hanson also reports that at a Munich public address in November 1941, Hitler had "disowned" the concept of Blitzkrieg by calling it an "idiotic word". Further, successful Blitzkrieg operations were predicated on superior numbers, air support and were possible for only short periods of time without sufficient supply lines. To that end, Hanson concludes that German military success was not accompanied by the adequate provisioning of its troops with food and materiel far from the source of supply, which contributed to its ultimate failure.

=== Economics ===
In the 1960s, Alan Milward developed a theory of blitzkrieg economics: Germany could not fight a long war and chose to avoid comprehensive rearmament and armed in breadth to win quick victories. Milward described an economy positioned between a full war economy and a peacetime economy. The purpose of the blitzkrieg economy was to allow the German people to enjoy high living standards in the event of hostilities and avoid the economic hardships of the First World War.

Overy wrote that blitzkrieg as a "coherent military and economic concept has proven a difficult strategy to defend in light of the evidence". Milward's theory was contrary to Hitler's and German planners' intentions. The Germans, aware of the errors of the First World War, rejected the concept of organizing its economy to fight only a short war. Therefore, focus was given to the development of armament in depth for a long war, instead of armament in breadth for a short war. Hitler claimed that relying on surprise alone was "criminal" and that "we have to prepare for a long war along with surprise attack". During the winter of 1939–1940, Hitler demobilized many troops from the army to return as skilled workers to factories because the war would be decided by production, not a quick "Panzer operation".

In the 1930s, Hitler had ordered rearmament programs that cannot be considered limited. In November 1937, he had indicated that most of the armament projects would be completed by 1943–1945. The rearmament of the Kriegsmarine was to have been completed in 1949 and the Luftwaffe rearmament program was to have matured in 1942, with a force capable of strategic bombing with heavy bombers. The construction and the training of motorized forces and a full mobilization of the rail networks would not begin until 1943 and 1944, respectively. Hitler needed to avoid war until these projects were complete but his misjudgements in 1939 forced Germany into war before rearmament was complete.

After the war, Albert Speer claimed that the German economy achieved greater armaments output not because of diversions of capacity from civilian to military industry but by streamlining of the economy. Overy pointed out some 23 percent of German output was military by 1939. Between 1937 and 1939, 70 percent of investment capital went into the rubber, synthetic fuel, aircraft and shipbuilding industries. Hermann Göring had consistently stated that the task of the Four Year Plan was to rearm Germany for total war. Hitler's correspondence with his economists also reveals that his intent was to wage war in 1943–1945, when the resources of central Europe had been absorbed into Nazi Germany.

Living standards were not high in the late 1930s. Consumption of consumer goods had fallen from 71 percent in 1928 to 59 percent in 1938. The demands of the war economy reduced the amount of spending in non-military sectors to satisfy the demand for the armed forces. On 9 September, Göring, as Head of the Reich Defense Council, called for complete "employment" of living and fighting power of the national economy for the duration of the war. Overy presents that as evidence that a "blitzkrieg economy" did not exist.

Adam Tooze wrote that the German economy was being prepared for a long war. The expenditure for the war was extensive and put the economy under severe strain. The German leadership were concerned less with how to balance the civilian economy and the needs of civilian consumption but to figure out how to best prepare the economy for total war. Once war had begun, Hitler urged his economic experts to abandon caution and expend all available resources on the war effort, but the expansion plans only gradually gained momentum in 1941. Tooze wrote that the huge armament plans in the pre-war period did not indicate any clear-sighted blitzkrieg economy or strategy.

=== Heer ===
Frieser wrote that the Heer (German pronunciation: [ˈheːɐ̯]) (Note: Heer is the generic German word for army; the armies of the German states which existed before Nazi rule (1933–1945) are commonly referred to as: the Imperial German Army (1871–1918) and Reichswehr (1919–1935). The Heer under the Nazis was a component of the Wehrmacht – the German Armed Forces (1935–1946).) was not ready for blitzkrieg at the start of the war. A blitzkrieg method called for a young, highly skilled mechanized army. In 1939–1940, roughly 50 percent of the soldiers had only a few weeks' training. The German Army, contrary to the blitzkrieg legend, was not fully motorized and had only 120,000 vehicles, compared to the 300,000 of the French Army. The British also had an "enviable" contingent of motorized forces. Thus, "the image of the German 'Blitzkrieg' army is a figment of propaganda imagination". During the First World War, the German army used 1.4 million horses for transport and in the Second World War 2.7 million horses. Only ten percent of the army was motorized in 1940.

Half of the German divisions available in 1940 were combat ready, but they were less well-equipped than the British and French or the Imperial German Army of 1914. In the spring of 1940, the German army was semi-modern in which a small number of well-equipped and "elite" divisions were offset by many second and third rate divisions". In 2003, John Mosier wrote that while the French soldiers in 1940 were better trained than German soldiers, as were the Americans later and that the German Army was the least mechanized of the major armies, its leadership cadres were larger and better and that the high standard of leadership was the main reason for the successes of the German army in World War II, as it had been in World War I.

=== Luftwaffe ===
James Corum wrote that it was a myth that the Luftwaffe had a doctrine of terror bombing in which civilians were attacked to break the will or aid the collapse of an enemy by the Luftwaffe in blitzkrieg operations. After the bombing of Guernica in 1937 and the Rotterdam Blitz in 1940, it was commonly assumed that terror bombing was a part of Luftwaffe doctrine. During the interwar period, the Luftwaffe leadership rejected the concept of terror bombing in favour of battlefield support and interdiction operations:

The vital industries and transportation centers that would be targeted for shutdown were valid military targets. Civilians were not to be targeted directly, but the breakdown of production would affect their morale and will to fight. German legal scholars of the 1930s carefully worked out guidelines for what type of bombing was permissible under international law. While direct attacks against civilians were ruled out as "terror bombing", the concept of the attacking the vital war industries – and probable heavy civilian casualties and breakdown of civilian morale – was ruled as acceptable.

Corum continued: General Walther Wever compiled a doctrine known as The Conduct of the Aerial War. This document, which the Luftwaffe adopted, rejected Giulio Douhet's theory of terror bombing. Terror bombing was deemed to be "counter-productive", increasing rather than destroying the enemy's will to resist. Such bombing campaigns were regarded as diversion from the Luftwaffe's main operations; destruction of the enemy armed forces. The bombings of Guernica, Rotterdam and Warsaw were tactical missions in support of military operations and were not intended as strategic terror attacks.

J. P. Harris wrote that most Luftwaffe leaders from Goering through the general staff believed, as did their counterparts in Britain and the United States, that strategic bombing was the chief mission of the air force and that given such a role, the Luftwaffe would win the next war and that

Nearly all lectures concerned the strategic uses of airpower; virtually none discussed tactical co-operation with the Army. Similarly in the military journals, emphasis centred on 'strategic' bombing. The prestigious Militärwissenschaftliche Rundschau, the War Ministry's journal, which was founded in 1936, published a number of theoretical pieces on future developments in air warfare. Nearly all discussed the use of strategic airpower, some emphasising that aspect of air warfare to the exclusion of others. One author commented that European military powers were increasingly making the bomber force the heart of their airpower. The manoeuvrability and technical capability of the next generation of bombers would be 'as unstoppable as the flight of a shell.

The Luftwaffe ended up with an air force consisting mainly of relatively short-range aircraft, but that does not prove that the German air force was solely interested in "tactical" bombing. It happened because the German aircraft industry lacked the experience to build a long-range bomber fleet quickly and because Hitler was insistent on the very rapid creation of a numerically large force. It is also significant that Germany's position in the centre of Europe to a large extent obviated the need to make a clear distinction between bombers suitable only for "tactical" purposes and those necessary for strategic purposes in the early stages of a likely future war.

=== Fuller and Liddell Hart ===
The British theorists John Frederick Charles Fuller and Captain Basil Henry Liddell Hart have often been associated with the development of blitzkrieg, but that is a matter of controversy. In recent years historians have uncovered that Liddell Hart distorted and falsified facts to make it appear as if his ideas has been adopted. After the war Liddell Hart imposed his own perceptions after the event by claiming that the mobile tank warfare has been practiced by the Wehrmacht was a result of his influence. By manipulation and contrivance, Liddell Hart distorted the actual circumstances of the blitzkrieg formation, and he obscured its origins. By his indoctrinated idealization of an ostentatious concept, he reinforced the myth of blitzkrieg. Imposing retrospectively his own perceptions of mobile warfare upon the shallow concept of blitzkrieg, he "created a theoretical imbroglio that has taken 40 years to unravel". Blitzkrieg was not an official doctrine, and historians in recent times have come to the conclusion that it did not exist as such:

It was the opposite of a doctrine. Blitzkrieg consisted of an avalanche of actions that were sorted out less by design and more by success. In hindsight—and with some help from Liddell Hart—this torrent of action was squeezed into something it never was: an operational design.

The early 1950s literature transformed blitzkrieg into a historical military doctrine, which carried the signature of Liddell Hart and Guderian. The main evidence of Liddell Hart's deceit and "tendentious" report of history can be found in his letters to Erich von Manstein, Heinz Guderian, and the relatives and associates of Erwin Rommel. Liddell Hart, in letters to Guderian, "imposed his own fabricated version of blitzkrieg on the latter and compelled him to proclaim it as original formula". Kenneth Macksey found Liddell Hart's original letters to Guderian in the latter's papers. Liddell Hart requested Guderian to give him credit for "impressing him" with his ideas of armored warfare. When Liddell Hart was questioned about this in 1968 and the discrepancy between the English and German editions of Guderian's memoirs, "he gave a conveniently unhelpful though strictly truthful reply. ('There is nothing about the matter in my file of correspondence with Guderian himself except... that I thanked him... for what he said in that additional paragraph'.)".

During the First World War, Fuller had been a staff officer attached to the new tank corps. He developed Plan 1919 for massive independent tank operations, which he claimed were subsequently studied by the German military. It is variously argued that Fuller's wartime plans and post-war writings were inspirations or that his readership was low and German experiences during the war received more attention. The German view of themselves as the losers of the war may be linked to the senior and experienced officers' undertaking a thorough review in studying and rewriting of all of their Army doctrine and training manuals.

Fuller and Liddell Hart were "outsiders". Liddell Hart was unable to serve as a soldier after 1916 after being gassed on the Somme, and Fuller's abrasive personality resulted in his premature retirement in 1933. Their views had limited impact in the British army; the War Office permitted the formation of an Experimental Mechanized Force on 1 May 1927, composed of tanks, motorized infantry, self-propelled artillery and motorized engineers but the force was disbanded in 1928 on the grounds that it had served its purpose. A new experimental brigade was intended for the next year and became a permanent formation in 1933, during the cuts of the 1932/33–1934/35 financial years.

=== Continuity ===
It has been argued that blitzkrieg was not new, and that the Germans did not invent something called blitzkrieg in the 1920s and 1930s. Rather, the German concept of wars of movement and concentrated force were seen in wars of Prussia and the German Wars of Unification. The first European general to introduce rapid movement, concentrated power and integrated military effort was Swedish King Gustavus Adolphus during the Thirty Years' War. The appearance of the aircraft and tank in the First World War, called an RMA, offered the German military a chance to get back to the traditional war of movement as practiced by Moltke the Elder. The so-called "blitzkrieg campaigns" of 1939 to around 1942 were well within that operational context.

At the outbreak of war, the German army had no radically new theory of war. The operational thinking of the German army had not changed significantly since the First World War or since the late 19th century. J. P. Harris and Robert M. Citino point out that the Germans had always had a marked preference for short decisive campaigns but were unable to achieve short-order victories in First World War conditions. The transformation from the stalemate of the First World War into tremendous initial operational and strategic success in the Second World War was partly the employment of a relatively-small number of mechanized divisions, most importantly the Panzer divisions, and the support of an exceptionally powerful air force.

=== Guderian ===
Heinz Guderian is widely regarded as being highly influential in developing the military methods of warfare used by Germany's tank men at the start of the Second World War. That style of warfare brought the maneuver back to the fore and placed an emphasis on the offensive. Along with the shockingly-rapid collapse in the armies that opposed it, that came to be branded as blitzkrieg warfare.

After Germany's military reforms of the Guderian emerged as a strong proponent of mechanized forces. Within the Inspectorate of Transport Troops, Guderian and colleagues performed theoretical and field exercise work. Guderian met with opposition from some in the General Staff, who were distrustful of the new weapons and who continued to view the infantry as the primary weapon of the army. Among them, Guderian claimed, was Chief of the General Staff Ludwig Beck (1935–1938), who he alleged was skeptical that armored forces could be decisive. That claim has been disputed by later historians. James Corum wrote:

Guderian expressed a hearty contempt for General Ludwig Beck, chief of the General Staff from 1935 to 1938, whom he characterized as hostile to ideas of modern mechanised warfare: [Corum quoting Guderian] "He [Beck] was a paralysing element wherever he appeared.... [S]ignificantly of his way of thought was his much-boosted method of fighting which he called delaying defence". This is a crude caricature of a highly competent general who authored Army Regulation 300 (Troop Leadership) in 1933, the primary tactical manual of the German Army in World War II, and under whose direction the first three panzer divisions were created in 1935, the largest such force in the world of the time.

By Guderian's account, he single-handedly created the German tactical and operational methodology. Between 1922 and 1928 Guderian wrote a number of articles concerning military movement. As the ideas of making use of the combustible engine in a protected encasement to bring mobility back to warfare developed in the German army, Guderian was a leading proponent of the formations that would be used for this purpose. He was later asked to write an explanatory book, which was titled Achtung Panzer! (1937) in which he explained the theories of the tank men and defended them.

Guderian argued that the tank would be the decisive weapon of the next war. "If the tanks succeed, then victory follows", he wrote. In an article addressed to critics of tank warfare, he wrote that "until our critics can produce some new and better method of making a successful land attack other than self-massacre, we shall continue to maintain our beliefs that tanks—properly employed, needless to say—are today the best means available for land attack".

Addressing the faster rate at which defenders could reinforce an area than attackers could penetrate it during the First World War, Guderian wrote that "since reserve forces will now be motorized, the building up of new defensive fronts is easier than it used to be; the chances of an offensive based on the timetable of artillery and infantry co-operation are, as a result, even slighter today than they were in the last war." He continued, "We believe that by attacking with tanks we can achieve a higher rate of movement than has been hitherto obtainable, and—what is perhaps even more important—that we can keep moving once a breakthrough has been made". (Note: Guderian's remarks are from an unnamed article published in the National Union of German Officers, 15 October 1937 as quoted in Panzer Leader, pp. 39–46.) Guderian additionally required for tactical radios to be widely used to facilitate coordination and command by having one installed in all tanks.

Guderian's leadership was supported, fostered and institutionalized by his supporters in the Reichswehr General Staff system, which worked the Army to greater and greater levels of capability through massive and systematic Movement Warfare war games in the 1930s. Guderian's book incorporated the work of theorists such as Ludwig Ritter von Eimannsberger, whose book, The Tank War (Der Kampfwagenkrieg) (1934) gained a wide audience in the German Army. Another German theorist, Ernst Volckheim, wrote a huge amount on tank and combined arms tactics and was influential to German thinking on the use of armored formations, but his work was not acknowledged in Guderian's writings.

== See also ==
- AirLand Battle, blitzkrieg-like doctrine of US Army in 1980s
- Armoured warfare
- Maneuver warfare
- Shock and awe, the 21st century US military doctrine.
- Vernichtungsgedanke, or "annihilation concept".
- Mission-type tactics
- Deep Battle, Soviet Red Army Military Doctrine from the 1930s often confused with blitzkrieg.
- Battleplan (documentary TV series)
- Vernichtungsschlacht, Battle of annihilation

== Bibliography ==
=== Books ===
- Alexander, Bevin (2002) [1993]. How Great Generals Win (repr. ed.). London: W. W. Norton. ISBN 978-0-393-32316-0.
- Battistelli, Pier Paolo (2013). Panzer Divisions: The Eastern Front 1941–43. Osprey. ISBN 978-1-4728-0002-2.
- Barbier, Mary Kathryn (2002). Kursk: The Greatest Tank Battle, 1943. Zenith Imprint. ISBN 978-0-760312-54-4.
- Beevor, Antony (1999). Stalingrad: The Fateful Siege. New York: Penguin Books. ISBN 978-0-670-87095-0.
- Beevor, Antony (2006). The Battle for Spain: The Spanish Civil War 1936–1939. New York: Penguin Books. ISBN 978-0-14-303765-1.
- Boyne, Walter (2002). Air Warfare. Santa Barbara, CA: ABC-Clio. ISBN 978-1-57607-345-2.
- Brighton, Terry (2008). Patton, Montgomery, Rommel: Masters of War. New York: Penguin. ISBN 978-1-40011-497-9.
- Buckley, John (1998). Air Power in the Age of Total War. London: UCL Press. ISBN 978-1-85728-589-5.
- Clark, Alan (1965). Barbarossa: The Russian–German Conflict, 1941–45. New York: Quill. ISBN 978-1-56865-712-7.
- Clark, Lloyd (2012). Kursk: The Greatest Battle: Eastern Front 1943. London: Headline. ISBN 978-0-7553-3639-5.
- Citino, Robert M. (2004). Blitzkrieg to Desert Storm: The Evolution of Operational Warfare. Lawrence: University Press of Kansas. ISBN 978-0-70061-363-2.
- Citino, Robert M. (2005). The German Way of War: From the Thirty Years' War to the Third Reich. Lawrence, KN: University of Kansas Press. ISBN 978-0-7006-1624-4.
- Citino, Robert M. (2008). The German Way of War: From the Thirty Years' War to the Third Reich. Lawrence, KS: University Press of Kansas. ISBN 978-0-70061-624-4.
- Cooper, Matthew (1997). The German Army, 1933–1945: Its Political and Military Failure. Chelsea, MI: Scarborough House. ISBN 978-0-8128-8519-4.
- Condell, Bruce; Zabecki, David T. (2008). On the German Art of War – Truppenführung: German Army Manual for Unit Command in World War II. Mechanicsburg, PA: Stackpole Books. ISBN 978-0-81173-552-0.
- Corum, James S. (1992). The Roots of Blitzkrieg: Hans von Seeckt and German Military Reform. Modern War Studies. Lawrence, KN: University Press of Kansas. ISBN 978-0-7006-0541-5.
- Corum, James S. (1997). The Luftwaffe: Creating the Operational Air War, 1918–1940. Lawrence, KN: University Press of Kansas. ISBN 978-0-7006-0836-2.
- Danchev, Alex (1998). Alchemist of War: The Life of Basil Liddell Hart. London.: Weidenfeld & Nicolson. ISBN 978-0-297-81621-8.
- Deist, Wilhhelm (2003). "War Preparations in Nazi Germany". In Roger Chickering; Stig Förster (eds.). The Shadows of Total War: Europe, East Asia, and the United States, 1919–1939. Cambridge and New York: Cambridge University Press. ISBN 978-0-52181-236-8.
- Dildy, Douglas (2014). Fall Gelb 1940: Panzer Breakthrough in the West. Oxford: Osprey. ISBN 978-1-78200-644-2.
- Domarus, Max, ed. (1973). Hitler. Reden und Proklamationen 1932–1945. Kommentiert von einem deutschen Zeitgenossen [Speeches and Proclamations 1932–1945. Commentary by a Contemporary German]. Vol. II. Wiesbaden: R. Löwit. ISBN 978-3-927068-00-1.
- Edwards, Roger (1989). Panzer, a Revolution in Warfare: 1939–1945. London/New York: Arms and Armour/Sterling. ISBN 978-0-85368-932-4.
- Ellis, John (1990). Brute Force. New York: Viking Penguin. ISBN 978-0-670-80773-4.
- Erickson, John (2001) [1962]. The Soviet High Command: a Military-political History, 1918–1941 (3rd Frank Cass, London ed.). New York: St. Martin's Press. ISBN 978-0-7006-0836-2.
- Falls, Cyril; Becke, A. F. (maps) (1930). Military Operations Egypt & Palestine from June 1917 to the End of the War. Official History of the Great War Based on Official Documents by Direction of the Historical Section of the Committee of Imperial Defence. Vol. 2. Part II. London: HMSO. OCLC 256950972.
- French, David (2000). Raising Churchill's Army: The British Army and the War Against Germany 1919–1945. London: Oxford University Press. ISBN 978-0-19160-826-1.
- Frieser, Karl-Heinz (2005). The Blitzkrieg Legend: The 1940 Campaign in the West [Blitzkrieg-legende: der westfeldzug 1940]. trans. J. T. Greenwood. Annapolis: Naval Institute Press. ISBN 978-1-59114-294-2.
- Galgano, Francis A. (2020). "Fort Eben-Emael: Geographic Pivot of the Western Front, 1940". In Guth, Peter L. (ed.). Military Geoscience. Advances in Military Geosciences. Cham: Springer International Publishing. pp. 99–114. doi:10.1007/978-3-030-32173-4_8. ISBN 978-3-030-32173-4. S2CID 226639825.
- Glantz, David M.; House, Jonathan M. (2004) [1999]. The Battle of Kursk. Lawrence, Kansas: University Press of Kansas. ISBN 978-0-7006-1335-9.
- Glantz, David (2012) [2001]. Operation Barbarossa: Hitler's Invasion of Russia 1941. Stroud, Gloucestershire, UK: The History Press. ISBN 978-0-7524-6070-3.
- Glantz, David (2009). To the gates of Stalingrad: Soviet-German Combat Operations, April–August 1942. Lawrence, KS: University Press of Kansas. ISBN 978-0-7006-1630-5.
- Glantz, David M.; House, Jonathan M. (1995). When Titans Clashed: How the Red Army Stopped Hitler. Modern war studies. Lawrence, KS: University Press of Kansas. ISBN 978-0-7006-0717-4. OCLC 468566904.
- Glantz, David M.; House, Jonathan M. (1999). The Battle of Kursk. Modern war studies. Lawrence, KS: University Press of Kansas. ISBN 978-0-7006-0978-9. OCLC 41338011.
- Glantz, David (November 2010). Barbarossa Derailed: The Battle for Smolensk, 10 July – 10 September 1941: The German Advance to Smolensk, the Encirclement Battle and the First and Second Soviet Counter-Offensives, 10 July – 24 August 1941. Vol. I. Solihull: Helion. ISBN 978-1-906033-72-9.
- Griehl, Manfred (2001). Junker Ju 87 Stuka. London/Stuttgart: Airlife Publishing/Motorbuch. ISBN 978-1-84037-198-7.
- Grossman, David A. (1993). "Maneuver Warfare in the Light Infantry-The Rommel Model". In Hooker, Richard D. (ed.). Maneuver Warfare. Novato, CA: Presidio. ISBN 978-0-89141-499-5.
- Guderian, Heinz (2001) [1952]. Panzer Leader. New York: Da Capo Press. ISBN 978-0-306-80689-6.
- Hanson, Victor Davis (2017). The Second World Wars: How the First Global Conflict Was Fought and Won. New York: Basic Books. ISBN 978-0-46506-698-8.
- Hardesty, Von (2012). Red Phoenix Rising: The Soviet Air Force in World War II. University Press of Kansas. ISBN 978-0-7006-1828-6.
- Harris, John Paul (1995a). Men, Ideas and Tanks: British Military Thought and Armoured Forces, 1903–1939. Manchester University Press. ISBN 978-0-7190-4814-2.
- Hill, Alec (1978). Chauvel of the Light Horse – A Biography of General Sir Harry Chauvel GCMG KCB. Carlton, Victoria, Australia: Melbourne University Press. ISBN 978-0-522-84146-6.
- Hitler, Adolf (1942). Jochmann, Werner (ed.). Monologe im Fuhrerhauptquartier 1941–1944. Die Aufzeichnungen Heinrich Heims [Monologues in the Fuhrer's Headquarters 1941–1944. The Records of Heinrich Heim] (1980 ed.). Hamburg: Knaus. ISBN 978-3-8135-0796-6.
- Holmes, Richard; Strachan, Hew; Bellamy, Chris; Bicheno, Hugh (2001). The Oxford Companion to Military History. Oxford: Oxford University Press. ISBN 978-0-19-866209-9.
- Horne, Alistair (1969). To Lose a Battle: France 1940. Boston: Little, Brown. OCLC 5258.
- Hughes, Matthew (2004). Allenby in Palestine The Middle East Correspondence of Field Marshal Viscount Allenby June 1917 – October 1919. Publications of the Army Records Society. Vol. 22. Stroud, Gloucestershire: Sutton Publishing Ltd for the Army Records Society. ISBN 978-0-7509-3841-9.
- Keegan, John (1987). The Mask of Command. New York: Viking Publishers. ISBN 978-0-14-011406-5.
- Keegan, John (1989). The Second World War. New York: Penguin Books. ISBN 978-0-14-303573-2.
- Keegan, John (2005). The Oxford Companion to World War II. London: Oxford University Press. ISBN 978-0-19-280666-6.
- Liddell Hart, B. H. (1970). History of the First World War. London: Pan. ISBN 978-0-330-23354-5.
- Manstein, Erich von (1983) [1955]. Verlorene Siege [Lost Victories] (in German). München: Monch. ISBN 978-3-7637-5051-1.
- Mercatante, Steven (2012). Why Germany Nearly Won: A New History of the Second World War in Europe. Santa Barbara, CA: Praeger. ISBN 978-0-313-39592-5.
- Melvin, Mungo (2011). Manstein: Hitler's greatest general. New York: Thomas Dunne Books/St. Martin's Press. ISBN 978-0-312-56312-7.
- Mellenthin, Friedrich von (1956). Panzerschlachten [Panzer Battles]. Old Saybrook, CT: Konecky & Konecky. ISBN 978-1-56852-578-5.
- Miksche, Ferdinand Otto (2006) [1941]. Blitzkrieg: The German Method 1939–1941 (reprint ed.). Military Library Research Service Limited. ISBN 9781905696147.
- Moorhouse, Roger (2011). Berlin at War: Life and Death in Hitler's Capital, 1939–45. London: Vintage. ISBN 978-0-09-955189-8.
- Mosier, John (2003). The Blitzkrieg Myth: How Hitler and the Allies Misread the Strategic Realities of World War II. New York: Harper Collins. ISBN 978-0-06-000976-2.
- Murray, Williamson; MacGregor, Knox (2001). The Dynamics of Military Revolution, 1300–2050. Cambridge; New York: Cambridge University Press. ISBN 978-0-52180-079-2.
- Murray, Williamson (2011). Military Adaptation in War: With Fear of Change. Cambridge; New York: Cambridge University Press. ISBN 978-1-13991-586-1.
- Naveh, Shimon (1997). In Pursuit of Military Excellence: The Evolution of Operational Theory. London: Frank Cass. ISBN 978-0-7146-4727-2.
- Newton, Steven (2002). Kursk: The German View. Cambridge: Da Capo Press. ISBN 978-0-306-81150-0.
- Overy, Richard (1995). War and Economy in the Third Reich. Oxford University Press. ISBN 978-0-19-820599-9.
- Paret, John; Craig, Gordon; Gilbert, Felix (1986). Makers of Modern Strategy: From Machiavelli to the Nuclear Age. New York: Oxford University Press. ISBN 978-0-19-820097-0.
- Perrett, Bryan (1983). A History of Blitzkrieg. New York: Jove Books. ISBN 978-0-515-10234-5.
- Pinkus, Oscar (2005). The War Aims and Strategies of Adolf Hitler. Jefferson, N.C.: McFarland. ISBN 978-0-7864-2054-4.
- Reynolds, David (2014). The Long Shadow:The Great War and the Twentieth Century (Second ed.). London: Simon & Schuster UK Ltd. ISBN 978-0-85720-637-4.
- Sheffield, G. (2011). The Chief: Douglas Haig and the British Army. London: Aurum Press. ISBN 978-1-84513-691-8.
- Shirer, William (1969). The Collapse of the Third Republic: An Inquiry into the Fall of France in 1940. New York: Simon & Schuster. ISBN 978-0-671-20337-5.
- Showalter, Dennis (2006). Patton and Rommel: Men of War in the Twentieth Century. New York: Penguin. ISBN 978-0-42520-663-8.
- Sheldon, J. (2017). Fighting the Somme: German Challenges, Dilemmas & Solutions. Barnsley: Pen & Sword Military. ISBN 978-1-47388-199-0.
- Simpkin, Richard (2000) [1985]. Race to the Swift: Thoughts on Twenty-First Century Warfare. Future Warfare. Vol. I. London: Brassey. ISBN 978-1-85753-135-0.
- Stone, Norman (2008). World War One: A Short History. Penguin Books Limited. ISBN 978-0-14104-095-0.
- Stroud, Rick (2013). The Phantom Army of Alamein: The Men Who Hoodwinked Rommel. London: Bloomsbury. ISBN 978-1-40883-128-1.
- Terraine, John (1998). The Right of the Line. Wordsworth Military Library. Ware, Herts: Wordsworth Editions. ISBN 978-1-85326-683-6.
- Tooze, Adam (2006). The Wages of Destruction: The Making and Breaking of the Nazi Economy. London: Allen Lane. ISBN 978-0-7139-9566-4.
- Wavell, Field Marshal Earl (1968) [1933]. "The Palestine Campaigns". In Sheppard, Eric William (ed.). A Short History of the British Army (4th ed.). London: Constable. OCLC 35621223.
- Weal, John (1997). Junkers Ju 87 Stukageschwader 1937–41. Oxford, UK: Osprey. ISBN 1-85532-636-1.
- Wheeler-Bennett, John W. (1980) [1954]. Nemesis of Power: The German Army in Politics 1918–1945. Basingstoke: Palgrave Macmillan. ISBN 0-333-06864-5.
- Willmott, H. P. (2002). When Men Lost Faith in Reason: Reflections on War and Society in the Twentieth Century. Studies in Military History and International Affairs. Westport, CN: Praeger. ISBN 978-0-31307-009-9.
- Willmott, H. P. (1984). June 1944. New York: Blandford Press. ISBN 978-0-7137-1446-3.
- Willmott, Hedley Paul (1990). The Great Crusade: A new complete history of the Second World War. New York: Free Press. ISBN 978-0-02-934715-7.
- Winters, Harold A. (2001). Battling the Elements: Weather and Terrain in the Conduct of War. London and Baltimore: Johns Hopkins University Press. ISBN 978-0-80186-648-7.
- Wintringham, Tom (1940). New Ways of War (PDF). New York: Penguin.
- Woodward, David R. (2006). Hell in the Holy Land World War I in the Middle East. Lexington: The University Press of Kentucky. ISBN 978-0-8131-2383-7.
- Zaloga, Steven; Madej, W. V. (1985). The Polish Campaign 1939. New York: Hippocrene Books. ISBN 978-0-88254-994-1.
- Zetterling, Niklas; Frankson, Anders (2000). Kursk 1943: A Statistical Analysis. Cass Series on the Soviet (Russian) Study of War. London: Frank Cass. ISBN 978-0-7146-8103-0.

=== Conferences ===
- Glantz, David (2001b). The Soviet-German War 1941–1945: Myths and Realities: A Survey Essay. A Paper Presented as the 20th Anniversary Distinguished Lecture at the Strom Thurmond Institute of Government and Public Affairs. no ISBN. Clemson, SC: Clemson University. Archived from the original on 18 February 2015.

=== Journals ===
- Erickson, Edward J. (2001b). "Ordered to Die: A History of the Ottoman Army in the First World War". Contributions in Military Studies (201). Westport Connecticut: Greenwood Press. ISSN 0883-6884. OCLC 43481698.
- Fanning, William Jr. (April 1997). "The Origin of the term "Blitzkrieg": Another View". Journal of Military History. 61 (2): 283–302. doi:10.2307/2953968. ISSN 0899-3718. JSTOR 2953968.
- Harris, John Paul (November 1995). "The Myth of Blitzkrieg". War in History. II: 335–352. doi:10.1177/096834459500200306. ISSN 0968-3445. S2CID 159933010.
- Watt, Robert (2008). "Feeling the Full Force of a Four Point Offensive: Re-Interpreting The Red Army's 1944 Belorussian and L'vov-Przemyśl Operations". The Journal of Slavic Military Studies. XXI (4). Routledge Taylor & Francis Group. doi:10.1080/13518040802497564. ISSN 1351-8046. S2CID 143413006.
- Winchester, Charles (20 January 2002). "Advancing Backwards: The Demodernization of the German Army in World War 2". Military Journal. 2 (1). Osprey: 18–25. ISBN 978-1-84176-041-4. ISSN 1467-1379. Archived from the original on 5 April 2013.
- Yerxa, Donald (June 2011). "Military History at the Operational Level: An Interview with Robert M. Citino". Historically Speaking. 12 (3): 10–12. doi:10.1353/hsp.2011.0039. S2CID 162320393.

=== Websites ===
- Andreas, Peter (2020). "How Methamphetamine Became a Key Part of Nazi Military Strategy (January 7, 2020)". Time. Time USA, LLC.
- De Gaulle, Charles (2009). "1890–1940: un officier non-conformiste" [1890–1940: An Unorthodox Officer]. charles-de-gaulle.org (in French). Archived from the original on 25 May 2015.
