= Manstein plan =

War plan of the German Army during the Battle of France in 1940

Coordinates: 50°51′00″N 04°21′00″E

Manstein plan/Fall Gelb (Case Yellow)
- Part of the Battle of France of the Second World War
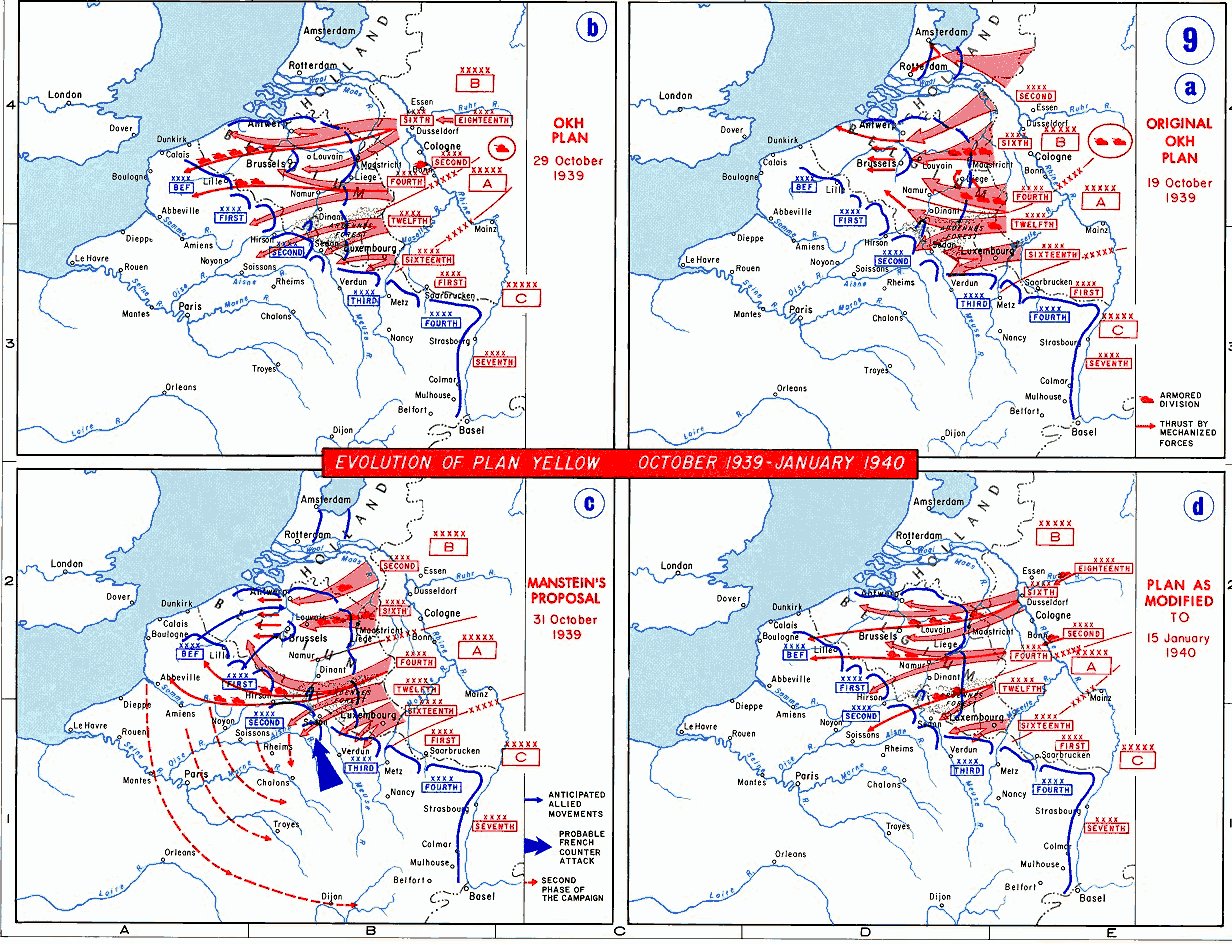
- Anti-clockwise from top right: Evolution of plans for Fall Gelb (Case Yellow), the invasion of France and the Low Countries
- Operational scope: Strategic
- Location: South-west Netherlands, central Belgium, northern France
- Planned: 1940
- Planned by: Erich von Manstein
- Commanded by: Gerd von Rundstedt
- Objective: Defeat of the Netherlands, Belgium and France
- Date: 10 May – 4 June 1940
- Executed by: Army Group A
- Outcome: German victory

The Manstein plan was the war plan of the German armed forces (Wehrmacht) for the Battle of France in 1940. (Note: Case Yellow German: Fall Gelb) also known after the war as Unternehmen Sichelschnitt a transliteration of the English term Operation Sickle Cut.) The original invasion plan was an awkward compromise devised by General Franz Halder, the chief of staff of Oberkommando des Heeres (OKH, Army High Command) that satisfied no one. Documents with details of the plan fell into Belgian hands during the Mechelen incident on 10 January 1940 and the plan was revised several times, each giving more emphasis to an attack by Army Group A through the Ardennes, that progressively reduced the offensive by Army Group B through the Low Countries to a diversion.

In the final version of the plan, the main effort of the German invasion was made against the Ardennes, the weakest part of the Allied line, where the defence was left to second-rate French divisions in the Second Army and the Ninth Army, on the assumption that the difficulty of moving masses of men and equipment would give the French plenty of time to send reinforcements if the area was attacked. The Seventh Army, which had been the most powerful part of the French strategic reserve, had been committed to a rush through Belgium to join with the Dutch Army to the north, in the Breda variant of Plan D, the Allied deployment plan.

== Nomenclature ==
The Manstein plan has often been called Operation Sichelschnitt, a transliteration of "sickle cut", a catchy expression used after the events by Winston Churchill. After the war, German generals adopted the term, which led to a misunderstanding that this was the official name of the plan or at least of the attack by Army Group A. The German name was Aufmarschanweisung Nr. 4, Fall Gelb (Campaign Instruction No. 4, Case Yellow) issued on 24 February 1940 and the manoeuvre through the Ardennes had no name.

== Background ==
The Manstein plan was a counterpart to the French Dyle plan for the Battle of France. Lieutenant-General Erich von Manstein dissented from the 1939 versions of Fall Gelb (Case Yellow), a plan for an invasion of France and the Low Countries, devised by Franz Halder. The original Aufmarschanweisung N°1, Fall Gelb (Campaign Instruction No 1, Case Yellow), was a plan to push the Allied forces back through central Belgium to the Somme river in northern France, with similarities to the 1914 campaign of the First World War. On 10 January 1940, a German aircraft carrying documents with parts of the plan for Fall Gelb crashed in Belgium (the Mechelen Incident) prompting another review of the invasion plan. Halder revised Fall Gelb to an extent in Aufmarschanweisung N°3, Fall Gelb and Manstein was able to convince Hitler in a meeting, on 17 February, that the Wehrmacht should attack through the Ardennes, followed by an advance to the Channel coast.

== Prelude ==
Manstein, chief of staff of Army Group A, had originally formulated his plan in October 1939 in Koblenz on the instigation of his commander, General Gerd von Rundstedt, who rejected Halder's plan, partly through professional rivalry and part because it could not inflict a decisive defeat on France. Manstein first thought to follow annihilation theory (Vernichtungsgedanke), envisaging a swing from Sedan to the north, rapidly to destroy the Allied armies in a cauldron battle (Kesselschlacht). When discussing his intentions with Generalleutnant (Lieutenant-General) Heinz Guderian, the commander of the XIX Panzer Corps, Guderian proposed to avoid the main body of the Allied armies and swiftly advance with the armoured divisions to the English Channel, taking the Allies by surprise and cutting their supply routes from the south. Manstein had many reservations about the proposal, fearing the long open flank to the south that would be created by such a bold advance. Guderian managed to convince him that the danger of a French counter-offensive from the south could be averted by a simultaneous secondary spoiling offensive southwards, in the general direction of Reims.

When Manstein first presented his ideas to OKH, he did not mention Guderian and made the attack to the north the main effort, with a few armoured divisions protecting the left flank of the manoeuvre. The changes were included because the original conception was too bold to be acceptable to many generals, who also considered that Guderian too radical; Halder and Walther von Brauchitsch rejected the Manstein concept. Reformulating it in a more radical sense did not help. Manstein and Halder were rivals; in 1938 Manstein had been the successor of the chief of staff Ludwig Beck but had been ousted when the latter was disgraced over the Blomberg–Fritsch affair. On 1 September 1938, Halder, rather than Manstein, had replaced Beck. In late January, Halder got rid of Manstein by having him promoted to the command of XXXVIII Corps in east Germany.

In late January, Lieutenant-Colonel Günther Blumentritt and Major Henning von Tresckow, on Manstein's staff, contacted Lieutenant-Colonel Rudolf Schmundt (an old acquaintance of Tresckow) the army attaché of Adolf Hitler, when he was visiting Koblenz, who informed Hitler of the affair on 2 February. Having found the Halder plan unsatisfactory from the start, Hitler ordered a change of strategy on 13 February in accordance with Manstein's thinking, after having heard only a rough outline. Manstein was invited to the Reich Chancellery in Berlin to meet Hitler on 17 February, in the presence of Alfred Jodl and Erwin Rommel. Though Hitler felt an immediate antipathy against Manstein for being arrogant and aloof, he listened silently to his exposition and was impressed by Manstein's thinking. Hitler remarked after Manstein had left, "Certainly an exceptionally clever fellow, with great operational gifts, but I don't trust him".

== Plan ==
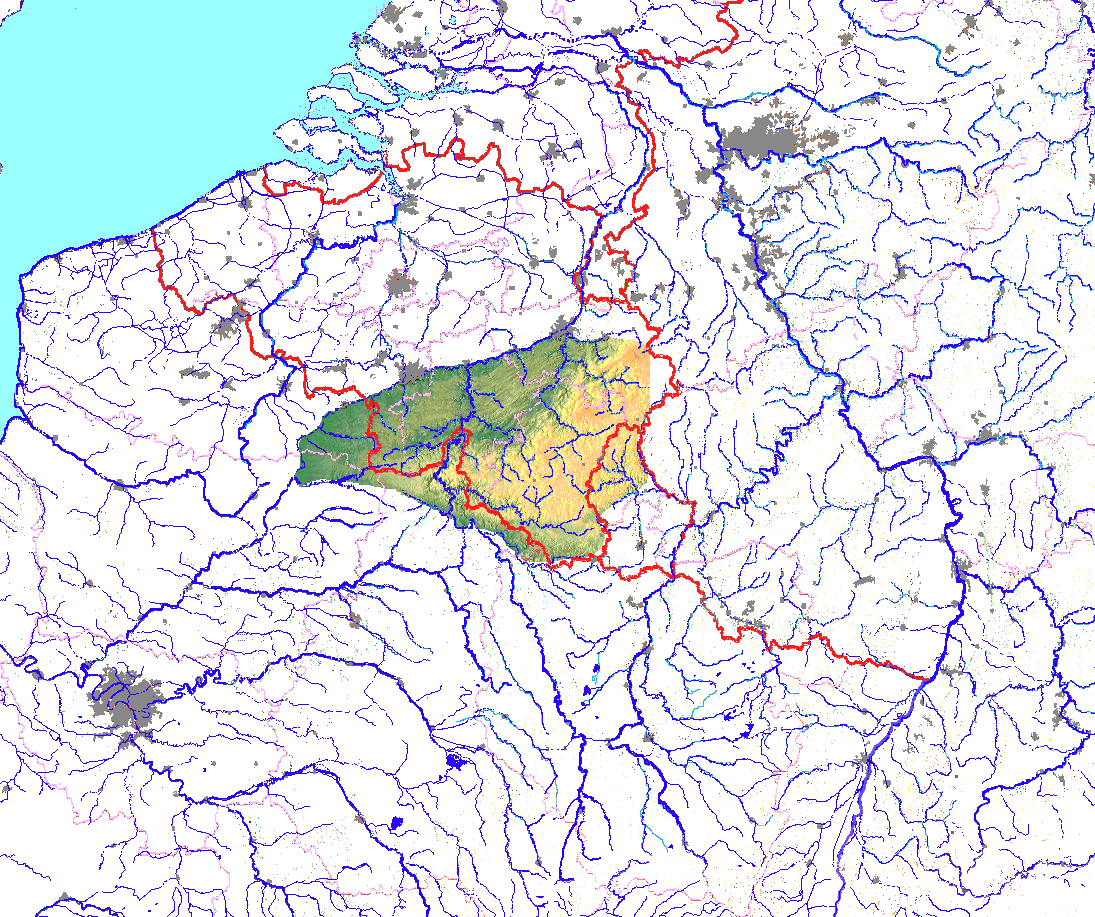
Map showing the Ardennes

Manstein took no more part in the planning and returned to eastern Germany. Halder had to revise the plan again, which became Aufmarschanweisung N°4, Fall Gelb. (Note: The Manstein plan has often been called Operation Sichelschnit, a transliteration of "sickle cut", a catchy expression used after the events by Winston Churchill. German generals adopted the term in their memoirs, which led to a misunderstanding that this was the official name of the plan or at least of the attack by Army Group A. The official German name was Aufmarschanweisung N°4, Fall Gelb as issued on 24 February 1940 and the manoeuvre through the Ardennes had no name.) The new plan conformed to Manstein's thinking in that Army Group A would provide the main thrust of the invasion through the Ardennes in southern Belgium. After crossing the Meuse River between Namur and Sedan, Army Group A would turn north-west towards Amiens, as Army Group B executed a feint attack in the north, to lure the Allied armies forward into Belgium and pin them down.

The revision was a substantial change in emphasis, in which Halder no longer envisaged a simultaneous secondary attack to the west but made it the main effort (Schwerpunkt). The dash for Abbeville was removed, river crossings were to be forced by infantry and there would be a long period of consolidation by a large number of infantry divisions crossing into the bridgeheads. The armoured divisions would then advance together with the infantry, not in an independent operational penetration. Halder rejected the idea of forestalling the French with a simultaneous attack to the south to occupy the assembly areas that the French would use for a counter-offensive.

== Battle ==
German advance by 14 May 1940

Five panzer divisions of Panzergruppe von Kleist advanced through the Ardennes; XIX Panzer Corps with three panzer divisions on the southern flank towards Sedan, against the French Second Army. The XLI Panzer Corps with two panzer divisions on the northern flank, advanced towards Monthermé, against the French Ninth Army (General André Corap). (Note: Panzergruppe Kleist had to move 134,000 men, 1,222 tanks and 378 vehicles through the Ardennes, creating the greatest traffic jam in European history.) XV Corps moved through the upper Ardennes towards Dinant, with two panzer divisions, as a flank guard against a counter-attack from the north. From 10 to 11 May, XIX Panzer Corps engaged the two cavalry divisions of the Second Army, surprised them with a far larger force than expected and forced them back. The Ninth Army, to the north, had also sent its two cavalry divisions forward, which were withdrawn on 12 May, before they met German troops.

Corap needed the cavalry divisions to reinforce the defences on the Meuse, because some of the Ninth Army infantry had not arrived. The most advanced German units reached the Meuse in the afternoon; local French commanders thought that the German parties were far ahead of the main body and would wait for it before trying to cross the river. From 10 May, Allied bombers had been sent to raid northern Belgium to delay the German advance, while the First Army moved up but attacks on the bridges at Maastricht had been costly failures (the 135 day bombers of the RAF Advanced Air Striking Force were reduced to 72 operational aircraft by 12 May).

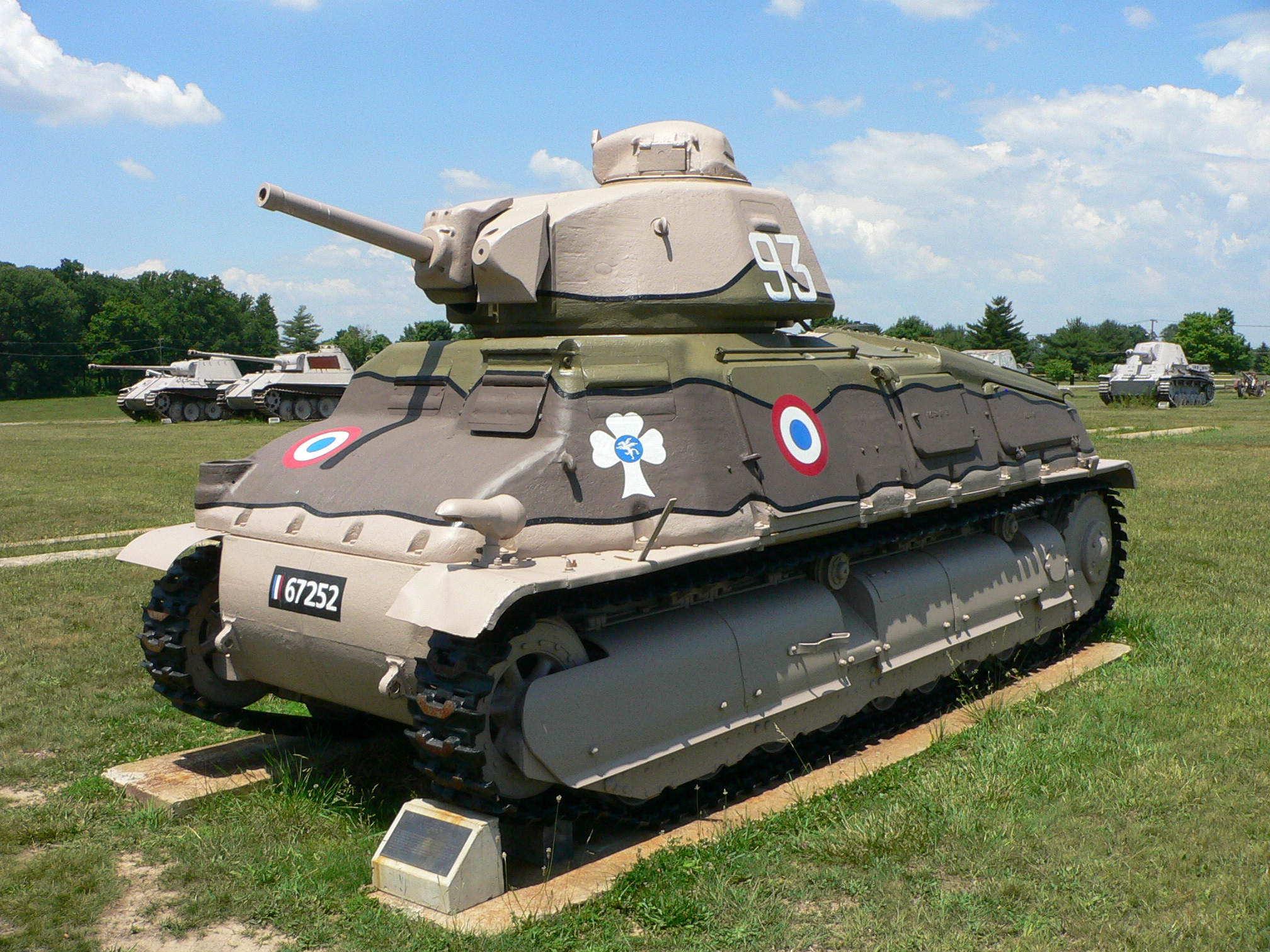
Photograph of a French SOMUA S35 (2005)

Against the plan, Guderian and the other panzer generals disobeyed their orders and quickly advanced to the Channel. The panzer forces captured Abbeville and then fought the Battle of Boulogne and the Siege of Calais, only temporarily being halted by orders from Hitler on 17, 22 and 24 May. After the halt orders the panzer forces advanced to the North Sea coast and fought the Battle of Dunkirk. The Manstein plan devastated the Allies, whose armies were cut in two, those in the north being encircled by Army Groups A and B, leading to the surrender of the Belgian Army and Operation Dynamo, the evacuation of the BEF and French forces from Dunkirk. Defeat in the north and the lack of mobile reserves led to the defeat of the remaining French and British forces in Fall Rot and the Armistice of 22 June 1940.

== Aftermath ==
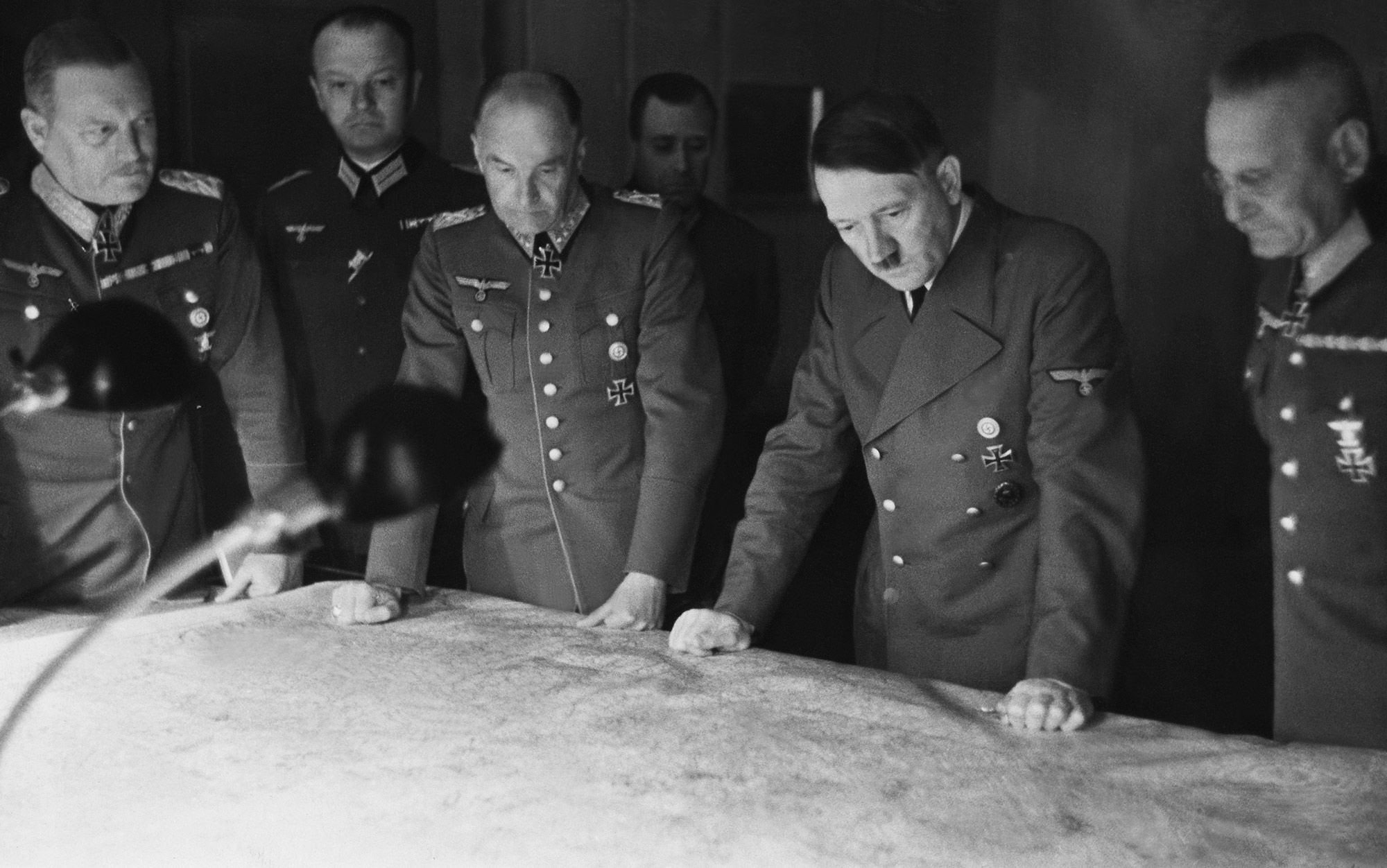
Keitel, Brauchitsch, Hitler and Halder (from l. to r.) studying a map of France during the 1940 campaign

The success of the German invasion surprised everyone; the Germans had hardly dared hope for such a result. Most generals had vehemently opposed the plan as being much too risky; even those supporting it had mainly done so out of desperation because the geostrategic position of Germany seemed so hopeless. Two of the most prominent were Hitler and Halder; Hitler had not liked Halder's original plans and had suggested many alternatives, some of them bearing a resemblance to the Manstein plan, the closest being a proposal made by him on 25 October 1939. Soon, Nazi propaganda began to claim that the victory was a result of Hitler's military genius; Hitler said,

Of all the generals with whom I spoke about the new attack plan in the West, Manstein was the only one who understood me!

After the war, Halder claimed he was the main instigator of the German plan, supporting this with the fact that he had begun to consider changing the main axis to Sedan as early as September 1939 and that Manstein's original proposal was too traditional.

The Manstein plan is often seen as either the result of or the cause of a mid-20th century Revolution in military affairs. In the former hypothesis, expounded by J. F. C. Fuller and Basil Liddell Hart immediately after the events, the Manstein plan is presented as a result of the evolution of German military thinking since the First World War by Hans von Seeckt and Guderian, adopting the ideas of Fuller or Liddell Hart. If true, an explicit Blitzkrieg doctrine would have been established by 1939 and been the basis of the plan for the Invasion of Poland; the Manstein plan would have been its most spectacular implementation. Blitzkrieg theory would have been reflected in the organisation and equipment of the army and Luftwaffe and would have been radically different from those of France, Britain and the Soviet Union, except for the contributions of individuals like Mikhail Tukhachevsky, Charles de Gaulle, Fuller and Liddell Hart. That the earliest plans by Halder or Manstein and the final plan by Halder did not conform to this doctrine is an anomaly, to be explained by circumstances.

In the latter hypothesis, favoured by Robert A. Doughty and Karl-Heinz Frieser, the Manstein plan was a return to the principles of 19th-century Bewegungskrieg (war of manoeuvre), adapted to modern technology by a sudden and unexpected departure from established German thinking, through the Blitzkrieg elements provided and executed by Guderian. The influence of Fuller and Liddell Hart in Germany was limited and exaggerated by them after the war; no explicit Blitzkrieg doctrine can be found in pre-war German army records. German tank production had no priority and plans for the German war economy were based on the premise of a long war, not a swift victory. The hypothesis allows for a gradual adoption during the 1930s of technologically advanced military equipment and integration into Bewegungskrieg thinking, familiar to all the great powers prior to 1940, differences being variations on a theme. The invasion of Poland was not "Blitzkrieg but an annihilation battle fought according to Vernichtungsgedanke" (annihilation theory). The lack of Blitzkrieg elements in the plans for Fall Gelb is seen as unremarkable; only after the crossings of the Meuse, the sudden success of the break-out and the insubordination of Guderian and other tank commanders during the rush down the Somme valley, would "Blitzkrieg" have been adopted as an explicit theory, in this view making Operation Barbarossa the first and only Blitzkrieg campaign.

Guderian presented the situation in his postwar book Erinnerungen eines Soldaten (Memories of a Soldier 1950, published in English as Panzer Leader) according to the second hypothesis, posing as a lone voice against the reactionary German officer corps. In 2006, Adam Tooze wrote that the quick victory in France was not the consequence of a logical strategic synthesis but a "risky improvisation" to cope with strategic dilemmas that Hitler and the German military leaders had been unable to overcome before February 1940. Tooze wrote that the Allies and the Germans had no interest in acknowledging the importance of improvisation and chance in the sensational victory of 1940. The fabrication of a Blitzkrieg Myth was convenient for the Allies to hide the incompetence that had led to their defeat. Rather than resort to technological determinism, German propaganda emphasised the machinery of the German army and that of the Allies, juxtaposing it with the heroic individualism of German soldiers, notably in the film Sieg im Westen (1941). OKW explained the victory as a consequence of the "...revolutionary dynamic of the Third Reich and its National socialist leadership".

Tooze wrote that a debunking of the technological interpretation of the German victory should not lead to the conclusion that it was the genius of Manstein or the superiority of German soldiers that caused the victory. There was no German grand-strategic synthesis; the course of the 1940 campaign depended on the economic mobilisation of 1939 and the geography of western Europe. During the winter of 1939–1940, the quality of German armoured forces was substantially improved. The plan attributed to Manstein was not a revolutionary departure from traditional military thinking but the concentration of superior force at the decisive point, a synthesis of "materialism and military art". The German army committed all its armoured units to the offensive and had it failed, would have had none left to resist an Allied counter-offensive. Casualties were high but the swift end to the campaign made them bearable. The Luftwaffe was also fully committed but the Allied air forces held back a substantial reserve, in anticipation of a longer campaign. The Luftwaffe gained air superiority but suffered far greater losses than the army. Operations on 10 May cost the Luftwaffe 347 aircraft and by the end of the month 30 per cent of its aircraft had been written off and 13 per cent badly damaged. The concentration of units in the Ardennes was an extraordinary gamble and had the Allied air forces bombed the columns, the advance could have been reduced to chaos. The "audacious" manoeuvre of Army Group A comprised only about twelve armoured and motorised divisions; most of the rest of the German army invaded on foot, supplied from railheads.

The Channel coast was a natural obstacle, only a few hundred kilometres from the German border and over such a distance, motorised supply from railheads over the dense west European road network was possible. The Germans could live off the land, amidst the highly developed agriculture of western Europe, unlike in Poland where it had been much harder to maintain momentum. Tooze concluded that although the German victory of 1940 was not determined by brute force, the Wehrmacht did not rewrite the rules of war or succeed because of the ardour of German soldiers and French pacifism. The odds against Germany were not so extreme as to be insurmountable by better planning for an offensive based on the familiar principles of Bewegungskrieg. The German army managed to concentrate a hugely powerful force at the decisive point but took a gamble of great magnitude that could not be repeated if the attack failed. When the Germans attempted to emulate the success of 1940 against the Soviet Union in 1941, little was left in reserve. The Red Army had a greater margin of numerical superiority, better leadership and more room for manoeuvre; the Napoleonic principle of the concentration of superior force at the decisive point was impossible for the Germans to achieve.

In the 2014 edition of Breaking Point, Doughty described how in a 1956 publication, Fuller wrote that the Battle of Sedan was an "attack by paralyzation" that he had devised in 1918 and incorporated into Plan 1919. Doughty wrote that although the Germans hoped for a quick victory, there is little evidence to support Fuller and that if the military theory later labelled Blitzkrieg was influential in the German officer corps, only those like Manstein and Guderian had fully accepted it. The disagreement between Kleist and Guderian that led Guderian to resign on 17 May, showed the apprehensions of the German high command about the speed of movement and vulnerability of the XIX Panzer Corps. Doughty suggested that the development of the Manstein plan showed that the force sent through the Ardennes was intended to follow a familiar strategy of Vernichtungsgedanke intended to encircle and annihilate the Allied armies in Kesselschlachten (cauldron battles). Twentieth-century weapons were different but the methods were little changed from those of Ulm (1805), Sedan (1870) and Tannenberg (1914). When German forces broke through on 16 May, they did not attack French headquarters but advanced westwards in the manner of a cavalry raid.

Doughty wrote that Fuller had called the advanced forces of the German army an armoured battering-ram, covered by Luftwaffe fighters and dive-bombers acting as flying field artillery, to break through a continuous front at several points. The XIX, XLI and XV panzer corps had operated as the leading force through the Ardennes but the most effective Allied resistance to the south and south-west of Sedan was reduced by the combined operations of infantry, tanks and artillery, a fact overlooked for long after 1940. Luftwaffe bombers had not acted as flying artillery and their main effect occurred on 13 May, when bombing collapsed the morale of the French 55th Infantry Division. Air attacks helped the ground forces to advance but destroyed few tanks and bunkers, most of which were taken by the skill and determination of German infantry, sometimes helped by anti-tank guns, accompanying guns and a few tanks. Fuller's writing was in the vein of much of the early reports of the Battle of France but since then new studies had added nuance, dwelling on the complications and chaos of the military operations. The Manstein plan led to much more than a simple tank rush through the Ardennes and the fields of northern France; the toughness and training of the German infantry should be recognised, along with the efforts of the engineers and artillery, which got the XIX Panzer Corps across the Meuse.

Doughty also wrote that the success of the German army could not adequately be explained without reference to French mistakes. French strategy was unusually vulnerable to an attack through the Ardennes; operationally, French commanders failed adequately to react to the breakthrough of massed panzer forces. Tactically, the Germans were often able to overcome French defences that usually were inadequate. French military intelligence failed to predict the main German attack, expecting it in central Belgium as late as 13 May. Military intelligence had made the elementary mistake of noting information that fitted with their assumptions of German intentions and paid insufficient attention to German capability or information suggesting that they were not conforming to expectations. Doughty wrote that the French failure was caused by an inadequate military system and that this had much to do with the success of the German invasion. The French had prepared to fight a methodical battle based on massed firepower, against an opponent that emphasised surprise and speed. French training for a centralised and slow-moving battle left the army incapable of hasty counter-attacks or bold moves. The French army lost the initiative, was overrun at important points and then deep German penetrations made the disruption of French command arrangements worse.

== See also ==
- Verlorene Siege
