= Vernichtungsgedanke =

German military doctrine of fast annihilation of the enemy

Vernichtungsgedanke, literally meaning "concept of annihilation" in German and generally taken to mean "the concept of fast annihilation of enemy forces", is a tactical doctrine dating back to Frederick the Great. It emphasizes rapid, fluid movement to unbalance an enemy, allowing the attacker to impose its will upon the defender and to avoid stalemate. It relies on uncommonly rigorous training and discipline and thoroughly-professional leadership. Much of Vernichtungsgedanke can be seen in Carl von Clausewitz's classic treatise Vom Kriege ("On War").

The doctrine was used in the War of Austrian Succession, the Seven Years' War, the Napoleonic Wars, the Austro-Prussian War and the Franco-Prussian War. The military success of the Kingdom of Prussia and later the German Empire was the catalyst of the alliance systems of 19th-century Europe.

The arms races of the period produced the military equipment that eroded the attacker's advantage during Europe's "Long Peace". It gave an advantage to the defender and set the stage for the stalemate of the First World War. Vernichtungsgedanke was still viable on the Eastern Front, as was seen at the Battle of Tannenberg and others, but trench warfare dominated the Western Front, left little or no space to manoeuvre to the enemy's flank or rear and made the idea difficult to achieve. The Germans developed infiltration tactics as a way of bringing the idea back, notably at the Battle of Caporetto and during Operation Michael.

During the 1930s, British Army officers such as Vivian Loyd proposed the widespread use of light tracked vehicles to provide speed and agility in support of tank units. Loyd's theory, known as the "armoured idea" or "all-tank idea", was not widely accepted by his superiors.

When World War II began, many German officers, including General Heinz Guderian, combined elements of infiltration tactics with tanks, which evolved into the methodology called "Bewegungskrieg" (literally: "War of movement") and was later dubbed Blitzkrieg by propagandists of both sides.

== See also ==
- Mission-type tactics (Auftragstaktik)
- Infiltration tactics
