= Karl-Heinz Frieser =

German military historian

Karl-Heinz Frieser (born 1949 in Pressath, Bavaria) is a German military historian and a retired colonel of the German Army.

== Life ==
Frieser joined the German Army in 1970 and started studying political science as well as history in 1978. In 1981 he acquired a doctorate degree with his thesis Die deutschen Kriegsgefangenen in der Sowjetunion und das Nationalkomitee "Freies Deutschland" (German prisoners of war in the Soviet Union and the National Committee for a Free Germany). After that, he was one of the principal researchers in the German Armed Forces Military History Research Office (Militärgeschichtliches Forschungsamt or MGFA). He published an account of the German war against France, denouncing the Blitzkrieg myth, which was translated into several languages (The Blitzkrieg Legend: The 1940 Campaign in the West). He was also one of the principal researchers for the German semi-official history project Germany and the Second World War.

In 2009 he retired from the MGFA.

== Works ==
- Die deutschen Kriegsgefangenen in der Sowjetunion und das Nationalkomitee "Freies Deutschland", Würzburg, 1981
- The Blitzkrieg Legend: The 1940 Campaign in the West, Naval Institute Press; 1st edition, 2005, ISBN 1591142946
- Ardennen – Sedan. Militärhistorischer Führer durch eine europäische Schicksalslandschaft, Frankfurt a.M./Bonn, 2000, ISBN 393238508X
- Frieser, Karl-Heinz; Schmider, Klaus; Schönherr, Klaus; Schreiber, Gerhard; Ungváry, Kristián; Wegner, Bernd (2007). Die Ostfront 1943/44 – Der Krieg im Osten und an den Nebenfronten [The Eastern Front 1943–1944: The War in the East and on the Neighbouring Fronts] (in German). Vol. VIII. München: Deutsche Verlags-Anstalt. ISBN 978-3-421-06235-2.
