= Rommel Museum =

Rommel Museum may refer to one of the following museums devoted to Erwin Rommel:

- Rommel Museum, Blaustein, a museum in Blaustein, Germany
- Rommel Museum, Mersa Matruh, a museum in Mersa Matruh, Egypt
