= Stemmer =

Stemmer may refer to:

- Helena Amélia Oehler Stemmer (1927–2016) Brazilian civil engineer and university professor.
- Stemmer, in stemming, the automated process which produces a base string in an attempt to represent related words
- Walburga Stemmer (1892–1928), German fruit-seller, had alleged affair with Erwin Rommel producing Gertrud Stemmer
- Willem P. C. Stemmer (1957–2013), Dutch scientist and entrepreneur
- Stemmer, a small village belonging to the municipality of Büsingen am Hochrhein, Germany
