= Rudolf Hartmann =

German banker and reserve officer

- Born: 1893
- Died: 1972 (aged 78–79)
- Military career
- Allegiance: Nazi Germany
- Branch: German Army
- Rank: Oberstleutnant
- Conflicts: World War II

Rudolf Hartmann (1893–1972) was a German banker and reserve officer. Known as one of the most prominent cooperative bankers in Germany during and after the Nazi era, he has been revealed by recent research as a leading member of the military resistance. Thanks to his cover as a banker, he managed to escape the purge that followed the failed July Bomb Plot.

In 1935, Hartmann began to have contact with the military resistance. In early 1940, when summoned by the commander of North West France, he had contact with the Commander-in-Chief OB West, Erwin von Witzleben. In 1942, he became a member of the staff of the military commander of occupied France, Carl-Heinrich von Stülpnagel. Together with General Hans Speidel, Colonel Karl-Richard Koßmann, Colonel Eberhard Finckh and Lieutenant Colonel Caesar von Hofacker, Hartmann became part of the core of the military resistance circles in Paris.

During May 1944, Hartmann and his fellow plotters tried to win Rommel over as a leading figure for the resistance. According to Hartmann, Rommel gave his decisive approval for the assassination attempt in a meeting at Hartmann's quarters in Mareil-Marly at the end of May. Schweizer considers Hartmann's eye-witness testimonies to be important evidence in support of Rommel's knowledge and support of the assassination attempt.

On 19 July 1944, Hartmann left Paris for Stuttgart and Murrhardt, and then went back to Paris (the driver, who also knew about and was involved in the plotters' plan, was Feldwebel Herbert Herold, another businessman in his civilian life). In the event of a successful attack, the Wehrmacht would have retreated from France and returned to South Germany, thus preparation had to be made. The whole process was conducted in cooperation with Goerdeler and Robert Bosch.

Historian Christian Schweizer comments that Hartmann's motivation arose from his negative experiences as a banker and later as a reserve officer under the Nazi regime. His dual role as an officer in the Wehrmacht and a chief banker in Stuttgart illustrates a network of resistance, which not only demonstrated the leading roles of Prussian aristocrats and military officers in the later assassination attempt on Hitler, but also bore the mark of the liberal-economic character of the Württemberg region.
