= Erwin Rommel =

German field marshal (1891–1944)

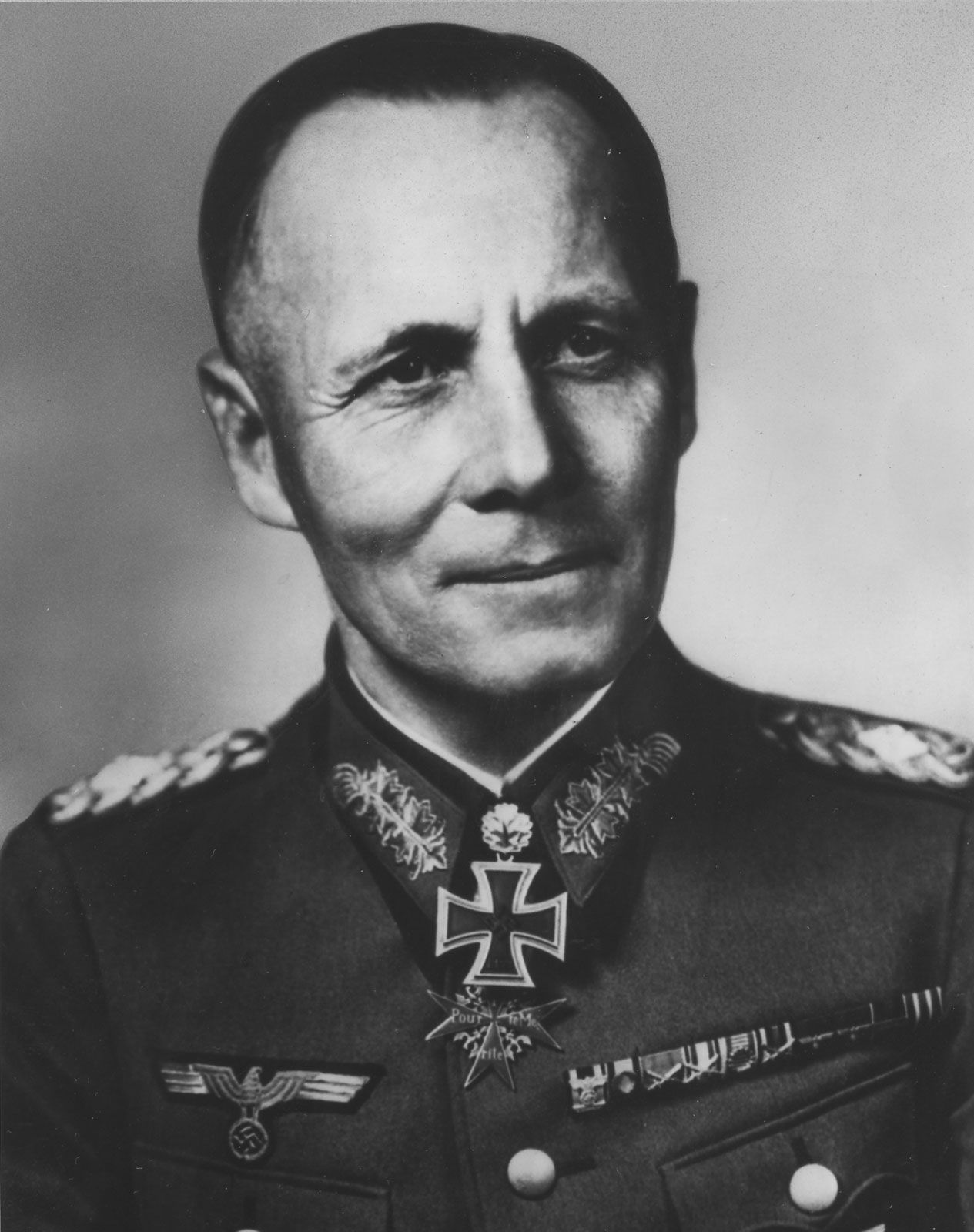
- Rommel in 1941
- Born: Johannes Erwin Eugen Rommel; 15 November 1891; Heidenheim, German Empire
- Died: 14 October 1944 (aged 52); Herrlingen, Greater German Reich
- Cause of death: Forced suicide by cyanide poisoning
- Burial place: Herrlingen cemetery
- Education: Kriegsschule
- Spouse: Lucia Maria Mollin (m. 1916)
- Children: Gertrud Stemmer; Manfred Rommel
- Military career
- Allegiance: Germany
- Branch: Imperial German Army; Reichswehr; German Army
- Service years: 1910–1944
- Rank: Generalfeldmarschall
- Nickname: Der Wüstenfuchs (The Desert Fox)
- Commands: 7th Panzer Division; Afrika Korps; Panzer Army Africa; Army Group Africa; Army Group B
- Conflicts: See battles: World War I; First Battle of the Argonne; Masivul Lesului and Oituz campaigns; Battle of Caporetto; World War II; Poland campaign; Battle of France; Battle of Arras (1940); Siege of Lille (1940); North African campaign; Operation Sonnenblume; Siege of Tobruk; Operation Brevity; Operation Battleaxe; Operation Crusader; Battle of Gazala; Battle of Bir Hakeim; Axis capture of Tobruk; Battle of Mersa Matruh; First Battle of El Alamein; Battle of Alam Halfa; Second Battle of El Alamein; Battle of El Agheila; Battle of Tripoli (1943); Battle of the Kasserine Pass; Battle of Medenine (1943); Operation Achse; Rommel offensive; Battle of Normandy
- Awards: Pour le Mérite; Knight's Cross of the Iron Cross with Oak Leaves, Swords and Diamonds; Wound Badge, in Gold

Johannes Erwin Eugen Rommel (pronounced [ˈɛɐviːn ˈʁɔməl]; 15 November 1891 – 14 October 1944), known as The Desert Fox (German: Der Wüstenfuchs, pronounced [ˈvyːstn̩ˌfʊks]), was a German Generalfeldmarschall (field marshal) during World War II. He served in the Wehrmacht of Nazi Germany, as well as in the Reichswehr of the Weimar Republic, and Imperial German Army of the German Empire.

Rommel was a highly decorated officer in World War I and awarded the Pour le Mérite for his actions on the Italian Front. In 1937, he published his classic book on military tactics, Infantry Attacks, drawing on his experiences in that war. In World War II, he commanded the 7th Panzer Division during the 1940 invasion of France. His leadership of German and Italian forces in the North African campaign established his reputation as one of the ablest tank commanders of the war, and earned him the nickname der Wüstenfuchs, "the Desert Fox". Among his British adversaries he had a reputation for chivalry, and his phrase "war without hate" has been uncritically used to describe the North African campaign. Some historians have rejected the phrase as a myth, citing crimes against North African Jewish populations, while others note there is no clear evidence Rommel was involved in or aware of these crimes. He later commanded the German forces opposing the Allied cross-channel invasion of Normandy in June 1944.

After the Nazis gained power, Rommel pledged allegiance to the new regime. However, historians have given different accounts of the specific period and his motivations. At least until near the war's end, he was a loyal supporter of Adolf Hitler, but not of the Nazi party and the SS. In 1944, Rommel was implicated in the 20 July plot (or Operation Valkyrie) to assassinate Hitler. Subsequently, Rommel was given a choice between suicide or facing a trial that would result in his disgrace and execution. He chose the former and took a cyanide pill. Rommel was given a state funeral, and it was announced he had succumbed to injuries from the strafing of his car in Normandy.

Rommel became a larger-than-life figure in Allied and Nazi propaganda, and in postwar popular culture. Numerous authors portray him as an apolitical, brilliant commander and a victim of Nazi Germany, although others have contested this assessment and called it the "Rommel myth". Rommel's reputation for conducting a clean war was used in the interest of the West German rearmament and reconciliation between the former enemies – the UK and the US on one side and the new Federal Republic of Germany on the other. Several of Rommel's former subordinates, notably his chief of staff Hans Speidel, played key roles in West German rearmament and integration into NATO in the postwar era. The German Army's largest military base, the Field Marshal Rommel Barracks, Augustdorf, and the third ship of the Lütjens-class destroyers of the German Navy are both named in his honour. His son Manfred Rommel was the longtime mayor of Stuttgart, Germany, and namesake of Stuttgart Airport.

== Early life and career ==
Rommel was born on 15 November 1891 in Heidenheim, 45 kilometres (28 mi) from Ulm, in the Kingdom of Württemberg, then part of the German Empire. He was the third of five children born to Erwin Rommel senior (1860–1913) and his wife Helene von Luz. Her father, Karl von Luz, headed the local government council. As a young man, Rommel's father had been an artillery lieutenant. Rommel had one older sister who was an art teacher and his favourite sibling, one older brother named Manfred who died in infancy, and two younger brothers, of whom one became a successful dentist and the other an opera singer.

At age 18, Rommel joined the Württemberg Infantry Regiment No. 124 in Weingarten as a Fähnrich (ensign), in 1910, studying at the Officer Cadet School in Danzig. He graduated in November 1911 and was commissioned as a lieutenant in January 1912 and was assigned to the 124th Infantry in Weingarten. He was posted to Ulm in March 1914 to the 49th Field Artillery Regiment, XIII (Royal Württemberg) Corps, as a battery commander. He returned to the 124th when war was declared. While at Cadet School, Rommel met his future wife, 17-year-old Lucia (Lucie) Maria Mollin (1894–1971), of Italian and Polish descent.

== World War I ==
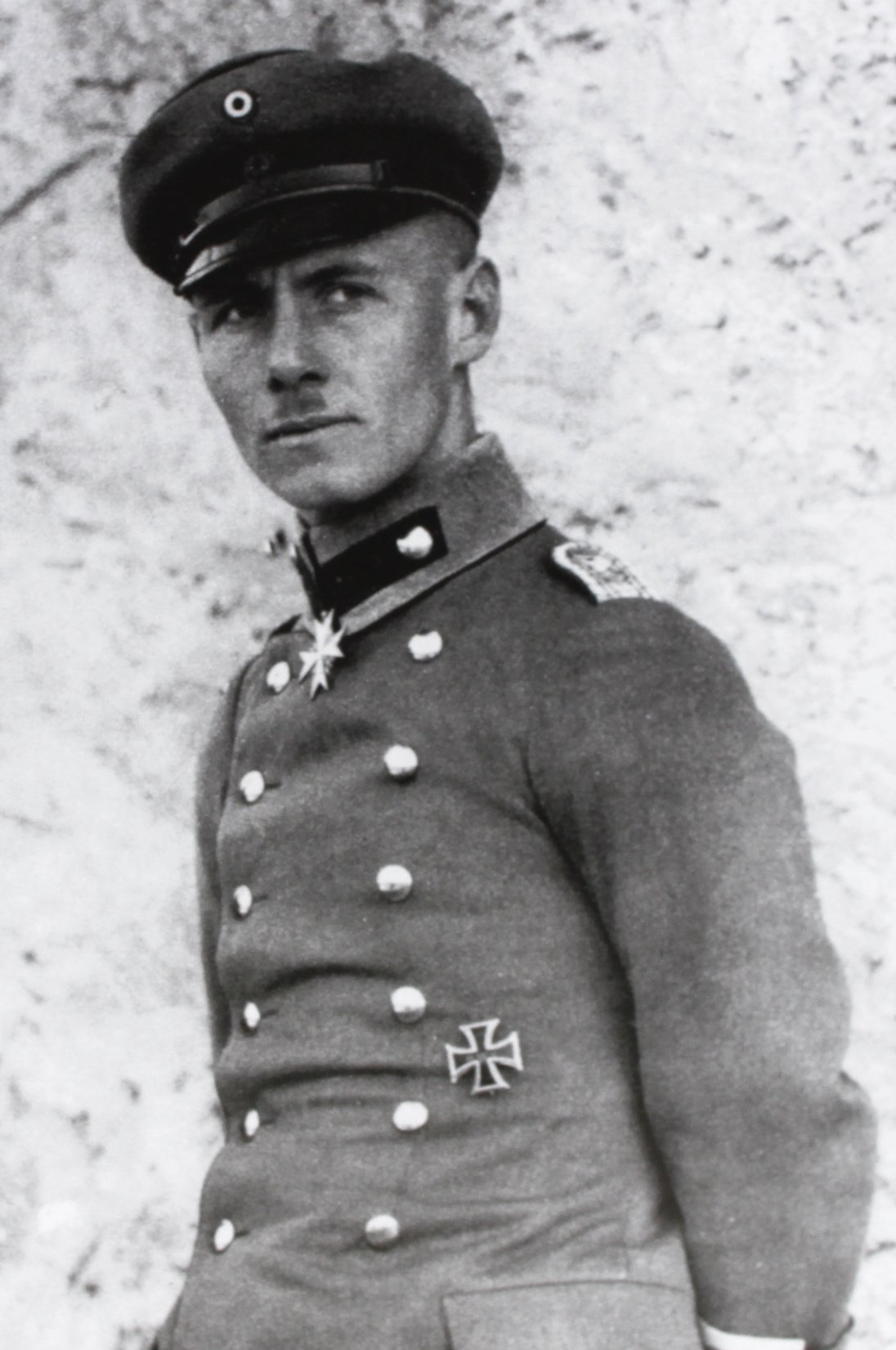
Lieutenant Rommel in Italy, 1917

During World War I, Rommel fought in France as well as in the Romanian campaign, notably at the Second Battle of the Jiu Valley, and the Italian campaigns. He successfully employed the tactics of penetrating enemy lines with heavy covering fire coupled with rapid advances, as well as moving forward rapidly to a flanking position to arrive at the rear of hostile positions, to achieve tactical surprise. His first combat experience was on 22 August 1914 as a platoon commander near Verdun, when – catching a French garrison unprepared – Rommel and three men opened fire on them without ordering the rest of his platoon forward. The armies continued to skirmish in open engagements throughout September, as the static trench warfare typical of the war was still in the future. For his actions in September 1914 and January 1915, Rommel was awarded the Iron Cross, Second Class. Rommel was promoted to Oberleutnant (first lieutenant) and transferred to the newly created Royal Wurttemberg Mountain Battalion of the Alpenkorps in September 1915, as a company commander. In November 1916 in Danzig, Rommel and Lucia married.

In August 1917, his unit was involved in the battle for Coșna Hill, a heavily fortified objective on the border between Hungary and Romania, which they took after weeks of difficult uphill fighting. The Mountain Battalion was next assigned to the Isonzo front, in a mountainous area in Italy. The offensive, known as the Battle of Caporetto, began on 24 October 1917. Rommel's battalion, consisting of three rifle companies and a machine gun unit, was part of an attempt to take enemy positions on three mountains: Kolovrat, Matajur, and Stol. From 25 to 27 October, Rommel and his 150 men captured 81 guns and 9,000 men, at a loss of six dead and 30 wounded. Rommel achieved this by taking advantage of the terrain to outflank the Italian forces, attacking from unexpected directions or behind enemy lines, and taking the initiative to attack when he had orders to the contrary. In one instance, the Italian forces, taken by surprise and believing their lines had collapsed, surrendered after a brief firefight. In this battle, Rommel helped pioneer infiltration tactics, a new form of manoeuvre warfare being adopted by German armies, and later by foreign armies, and later described by some as Blitzkrieg without tanks. However, he played no role in the early adoption of Blitzkrieg in World War II.

Acting as advance guard in the capture of Longarone on 9 November 1917, Rommel again decided to attack with a much smaller force. Convinced that they were surrounded by an entire German division, the 1st Italian Infantry Division – 10,000 men – surrendered to Rommel. For this and his actions at Matajur, he received the order of Pour le Mérite.

In January 1918, Rommel was promoted to Hauptmann (captain) and assigned to a staff position in the 64th Army Corps, where he served for the remainder of the war. In his book Infanterie greift an, Rommel wrote in detail about his activities during World War I.

== Interwar period ==
Rommel remained with the 124th Regiment until October 1920. The regiment was involved in quelling riots and civil disturbances occurring throughout Germany. Wherever possible, Rommel avoided the use of force. In 1919, he was briefly sent to Friedrichshafen on Lake Constance, where he restored order by "sheer force of personality" in the 32nd Internal Security Company, which was composed of rebellious and pro-communist sailors. He decided against storming nearby Lindau, which had been taken by revolutionary communists. Instead, Rommel negotiated with the city council and returned it to the legitimate government through diplomatic means. This was followed by his defence of Schwäbisch Gmünd, again bloodless. He was then posted to the Ruhr, where a Red Army was responsible for fomenting unrest. Historian Raffael Scheck praised Rommel as a coolheaded and moderate mind, exceptional amid the many takeovers of revolutionary cities by regular and irregular units and the associated violence.

According to Reuth, this period gave Rommel the indelible impression that "Everyone in this Republic was fighting each other", along with the direct experience of people who attempted to convert Germany into a socialist republic on Soviet lines. Like Rommel, Hitler had known the solidarity of trench warfare and had participated in the Reichswehr's suppression of the First and Second Bavarian Soviet Republics. The need for national unity thus became a legacy of the first World War. Brighton noted that while both believed in the stab-in-the-back myth, Rommel was able to succeed using peaceful methods because he saw the problem as related to economics, rather than Judeo-Bolshevism – which right-wing soldiers such as Hitler blamed for the chaos.

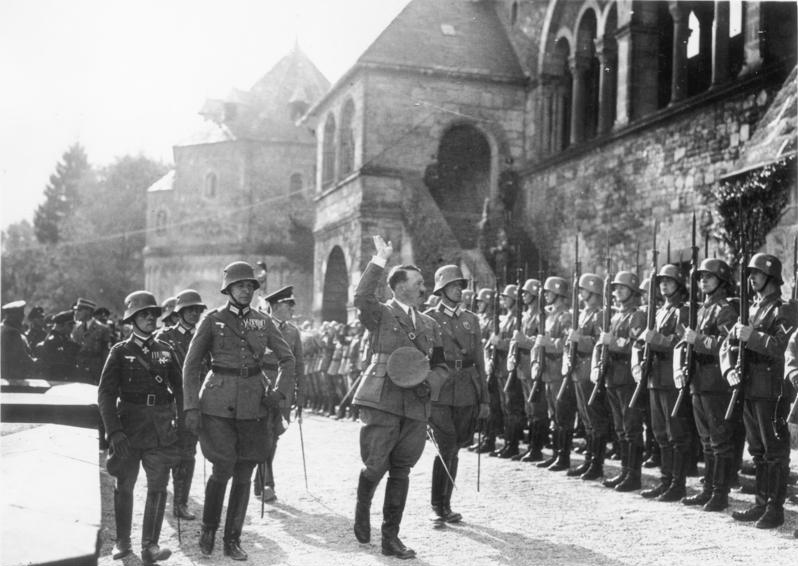
Rommel and Adolf Hitler in Goslar, 1934

On 1 October 1920, Rommel was appointed to a company command with the 13th Infantry Regiment in Stuttgart, a post he held for the next nine years. He was then assigned to an instruction position at the Dresden Infantry School from 1929 to 1933. In April 1932, he was promoted to major. While at Dresden, he wrote a manual on infantry training, published in 1934. In October 1933, he was promoted to Oberstleutnant (lieutenant colonel) and given his next command, the 3rd Jäger Battalion, 17th Infantry Regiment, stationed at Goslar. There he first met Adolf Hitler, who inspected his troops on 30 September 1934.

In September 1935, Rommel was moved to the Kriegsschule (War Academy) in Potsdam as an instructor, serving for the next three years. His book Infanterie greift an (Infantry Attacks), a description of his wartime experiences along with his analysis, was published in 1937. It became a bestseller, which, according to Scheck, later "enormously influenced" many armies. Hitler owned a copy.

Hearing of Rommel's reputation as an outstanding military instructor, in February 1937 Hitler assigned him as the War Ministry liaison officer to the Hitler Youth in charge of military training. Here, Rommel clashed with Baldur von Schirach, the Reichsjugendführer, over the training the boys should receive. Trying to fulfil a mission assigned to him by the Ministry of War, Rommel had twice proposed a plan that would have effectively subordinated Hitler Youth to the Wehrmacht, removing it from NSDAP control. That went against Schirach's express wishes. Schirach appealed to Hitler; consequently, Rommel was quietly removed from the project in 1938. He had been promoted to Oberst (colonel), on 1 August 1937. After the Anschluss in March 1938, he was appointed commandant of the Theresian Military Academy at Wiener Neustadt.

In October 1938, Adolf Hitler specially requested that Rommel be seconded to command the Führerbegleitbatallion (his escort battalion). This unit accompanied Hitler whenever he travelled outside of Germany. Rommel indulged his interest in engineering and mechanics by learning about the inner workings and maintenance of combustion engines and heavy machine guns. He memorised logarithm tables in his spare time, and enjoyed skiing and other outdoor sports. Ian Beckett wrote that by 1938, Rommel drifted towards uncritical acceptance of the Nazi regime, quoting Rommel's letter to his wife in which he stated "The German Wehrmacht is the sword of the new German world view", as a reaction to a speech by Hitler.

During his visit to Switzerland in 1938, Rommel reported that Swiss soldiers who he met showed "remarkable understanding of our Jewish problem". Biographer Daniel Allen Butler commented that he did share the view (popular in Germany and many countries) that the Jews were loyal to themselves rather than the nations in which they lived. Despite this, other evidence shows he considered the Nazi racial theories to be rubbish. Alaric Searle comments that Rommel knew the official stand of the regime, but in this case, the phrase was ambiguous and there is no evidence after or before this event that he ever sympathised with the antisemitism of the Nazi movement. Rommel's son Manfred Rommel stated in the documentary The Real Rommel that his father would "look the other way" when faced with anti-Jewish violence on the streets. But Rommel requested proof of "Aryan descent" from the Italian boyfriend of his illegitimate daughter Gertrud. During his time in Goslar, he repeatedly clashed with the SA whose members terrorised the Jews and dissident citizens. After the Röhm Purge (1934), he mistakenly believed that the worst was over, although restrictions on Jewish businesses were still being imposed and agitation against Jews continued. Manfred Rommel recounted that his father knew about and privately disagreed with the regime's antisemitism, but he had not actively campaigned on behalf of the Jews. However, Uri Avnery notes that even when Rommel was a low-ranking officer, he protected Jews who lived in his district. Manfred Rommel told the Stuttgarter Nachrichten that their family lived in isolated military facilities but knew about discrimination against the Jews occurring outside. They could not foresee the enormity of the impending atrocities, about which they only knew much later.

Rommel wrote to his wife that Hitler had a "magnetic, maybe hypnotic, strength" that had its origin in Hitler's belief that he "was called upon by God", and Hitler sometimes "spoke from the depth of his being [...] like a prophet".

== World War II ==
=== Poland 1939 ===
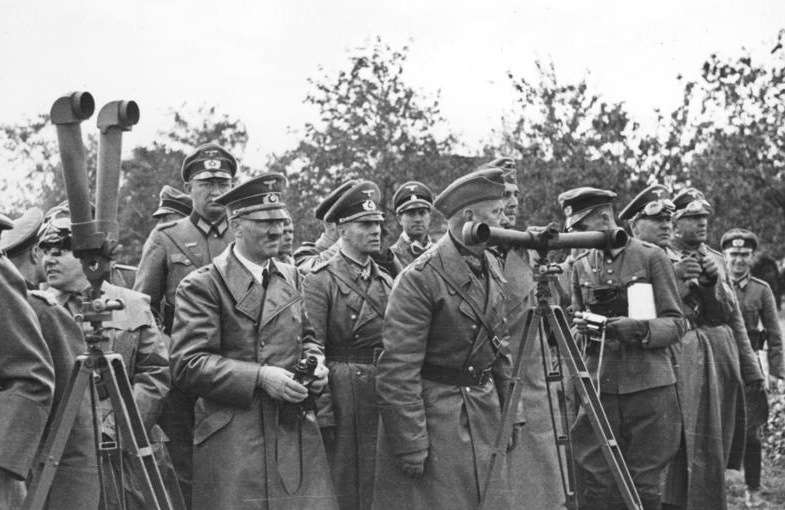
Hitler in Poland (September 1939). Rommel is on his left and Martin Bormann on his right.

Rommel was promoted to Generalmajor in August 1939 and assigned commander of the Führerbegleitbatallion, guarding Hitler and his field headquarters during the invasion of Poland, which began on 1 September. Rommel's letters show he did not initially understand Hitler's true nature and intentions, as he quickly went from predicting a swift peaceful settlement to approving Hitler's reaction ("bombs will be retaliated with bombs") to the Gleiwitz incident, a false flag operation used as pretext for the invasion. Rommel attended Hitler's daily briefings and accompanied him everywhere, making use of the opportunity to observe first-hand the use of tanks and other motorised units. On 26 September Rommel returned to Berlin to set up a new headquarters for his unit in the Reich Chancellery. Rommel briefly returned to occupied Warsaw on 5 October to prepare for the German victory parade. In a letter to his wife he claimed that the occupation by Nazi Germany was "probably welcomed with relief" by the inhabitants of the ruined city and that they were "rescued".

=== France 1940 ===
==== Promotion to armoured division commander ====
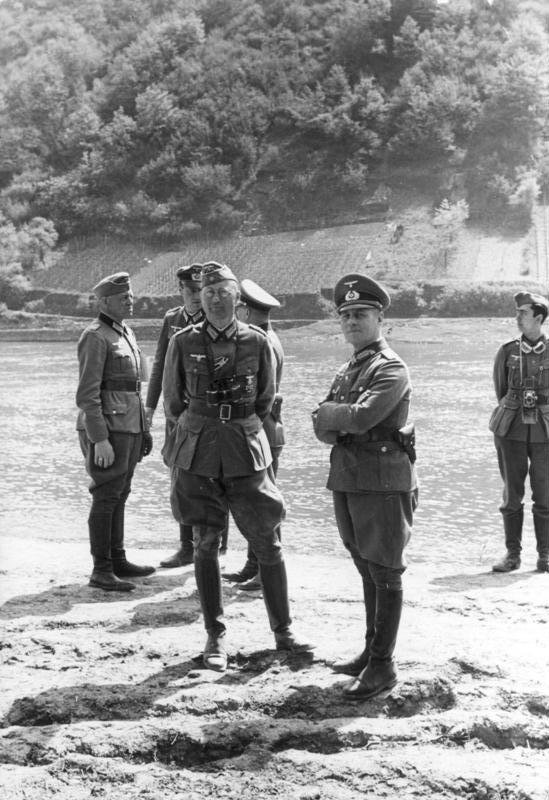
Rommel and his staff observed troops of the 7th Panzer Division conducting river-crossing exercises on the Moselle River in France, 1940.

Following the invasion of Poland, Rommel began lobbying for command of one of Germany's panzer divisions, of which there were then only ten. Rommel's successes in World War I were based on surprise and manoeuvre, two elements for which the new panzer units were ideally suited. Rommel received promotion to general from Hitler ahead of more senior officers. Rommel obtained the command he aspired to, despite having been earlier turned down by the army's personnel office, which had offered command of a mountain division instead. Rommel was backed by Hitler, the influential Fourteenth Army commander Wilhelm List, a fellow Württemberger middle-class "military outsider", and likely Heinz Guderian, commander of XIX Army Corps.

Going against military protocol, this promotion added to Rommel's growing reputation as one of Hitler's favoured commanders, although his outstanding leadership in France quelled complaints about his promotion and political scheming. The 7th Panzer Division had been converted to an armoured division consisting of 218 tanks in three battalions, with two rifle regiments, a motorcycle battalion, an engineer battalion, and an anti-tank battalion. Upon taking command on 10 February 1940, Rommel set his unit to practising the manoeuvres they would need in the upcoming campaign.

==== Invasion of the Netherlands, Belgium and France ====
The invasion began on 10 May 1940. By the third day Rommel and advance elements of his division, with a detachment of the 5th Panzer Division, had reached the Meuse, where they found the bridges had been destroyed. Rommel was active in the forward areas, directing efforts to make a crossing, which were initially unsuccessful because of suppressive fire by the French. Rommel brought up tanks and flak units to provide counter-fire and had nearby houses set on fire to create a smokescreen. He sent infantry across in rubber boats, appropriated the bridging tackle of the 5th Panzer Division, grabbed a light machine gun to fight off a French counterattack supported by tanks, and went into the water himself, encouraging the sappers and helping lash together the pontoons. By 16 May Rommel reached Avesnes, and contravening orders, pressed on to Cateau. That night, the French II Army Corps was shattered and on 17 May, Rommel's forces took 10,000 prisoners, losing 36 men. He was surprised to find only his vanguard had followed his tempestuous surge. The High Command and Hitler had been nervous about his disappearance, although they awarded him the Knight's Cross. Rommel and Guderian's successes and the possibilities offered by the new tank arm were welcomed by a few generals, but worried and paralysed the rest.

On 20 May, Rommel reached Arras. General Hermann Hoth received orders that the town should be bypassed and its British garrison thus isolated. He ordered the 5th Panzer Division to move to the west and the 7th Panzer Division to the east, flanked by the SS Division Totenkopf. The following day, the British launched a counterattack in the Battle of Arras. It failed and the British withdrew.

7th Panzer continued its advance, reaching Lille on 27 May. The Siege of Lille continued until 31 May, when the French garrison of 40,000 men surrendered. Rommel was summoned to Berlin to meet Hitler. He was the only divisional commander present at the planning session for Fall Rot (Case Red), the second phase of the invasion of France.

==== Drive for the Channel ====
Rommel, resuming his advance on 5 June, drove for the River Seine to secure bridges near Rouen. Advancing 100 kilometres (60 mi) in two days, the division reached Rouen to find it defended by three French tanks which destroyed German tanks before being destroyed themselves. The German force, enraged by this, forbade fire brigades access to the burning district of the Norman capital, so most of the historic quarter was reduced to ashes. Rommel instructed the German artillery to bombard the city as a "fire demonstration". The smoke was intense enough that it reached Paris. Daniel Allen Butler states that the bridges to the city were already destroyed. After the fall of the city, an estimated 100 black civilians and colonial troops were executed on 9 June by unknown German units. Rouen fell to the 5th Panzer Division, while Rommel advanced from the Seine towards the Channel. On 10 June, Rommel, near Dieppe, sent Hoth the message "Am on the coast". On 17 June, 7th Panzer was ordered to advance on Cherbourg, where British evacuations were under way. The division advanced 240 km (150 mi) in 24 hours, and after two days of shelling, the French garrison surrendered. The speed and surprise it consistently achieved, to the point that both the enemy and the Oberkommando des Heeres (OKH; German "High Command of the Army") at times lost track of its whereabouts, earned the 7th Panzers the nickname Gespensterdivision ("ghost division").

After the armistice with the French was signed on 22 June, the division was placed in reserve, being sent first to the Somme and then Bordeaux to reequip and prepare for Unternehmen Seelöwe (Operation Sea Lion), the planned invasion of Britain. This invasion was cancelled.

=== North Africa 1941–1943 ===
Western Desert battle area

On 6 February 1941, Rommel was appointed commander of the new Afrika Korps (Deutsches Afrika Korps; DAK), consisting initially of the 5th Light Division (later 21st Panzer Division) and 15th Panzer Division. Promoted to Generalleutnant, he arrived in Tripoli on 12 February. The DAK had been sent in Operation Sonnenblume to support Italian forces that had suffered heavy defeats in Operation Compass. His operations in the Western Desert Campaign soon earned him the nickname "Desert Fox" in both Allied and German reporting. (Note: It is not known exactly who first coined the name; Desert Fox and Wüstenfuchs came into use at about the same time.) Allied troops in the theatre were commanded by General Archibald Wavell.

==== First Axis offensive ====
Formally subordinate to Italian commander-in-chief General Italo Gariboldi, Rommel rejected the instructions of the Oberkommando der Wehrmacht (OKW) to hold a defensive line near Sirte. Encouraged by Hitler to act aggressively, he launched a limited offensive on 24 March 1941 with 5th Light Division and two Italian divisions, even though 15th Panzer Division had not yet arrived. The British, weakened by the transfer of formations to the Battle of Greece, fell back to Mersa El Brega, where they were defeated on 31 March.

Rommel then pushed rapidly east, taking Benghazi on 3 April as the British withdrew. When Gariboldi ordered him to halt at Mersa El Brega, Rommel argued that "one cannot permit unique opportunities to slip by for the sake of trifles", and misrepresented a signal from General Franz Halder so as to claim freedom of action. By 8 April Axis forces had reoccupied most of Cyrenaica; only the port of Tobruk held out and was invested on 11 April. Throughout the campaign fuel, food and water remained chronic problems, as everything had to be brought from Europe and moved over difficult desert tracks.

==== Siege of Tobruk ====
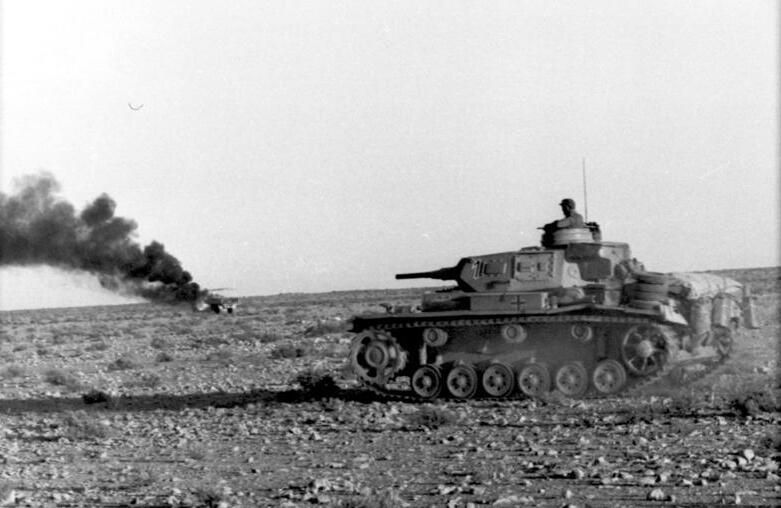
Afrika Korps Panzer III drives past a burning vehicle, April 1941

Tobruk was not fully encircled, since the garrison could be supplied by sea, but Rommel regarded its capture as essential to shorten his overstretched supply line and gain port capacity for further operations. The strongly fortified port, held by about 36,000 Commonwealth troops under Australian Lieutenant General Leslie Morshead, withstood a surprise assault on 14 April.

Repeated German–Italian attacks failed. A second assault at the end of April 1941 was repulsed, and an Allied attempt to break the siege in Operation Brevity in May, followed by Operation Battleaxe in June, also ended in failure. The outcome contributed to Wavell’s replacement by General Claude Auchinleck as theatre commander.

In August 1941 Rommel was appointed commander of the newly created Panzer Army Africa, with Fritz Bayerlein as chief of staff. The Afrika Korps (15th Panzer and the reinforced 21st Panzer Division) under Generalleutnant Ludwig Crüwell, together with 90th Light Division and several Italian formations, formed his main striking force, while Field Marshal Albert Kesselring was given overall responsibility for the Mediterranean area to improve air and sea coordination.

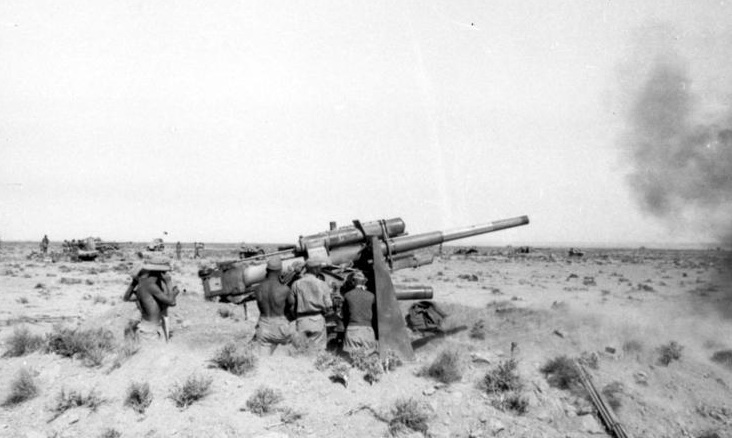
Near Bir Hacheim: 8.8cm Flak guns firing; Rommel's vehicle in the background

Auchinleck reorganised his forces into XXX and XIII Corps, forming the British Eighth Army under General Alan Cunningham. As Rommel prepared another attempt on Tobruk for November, Auchinleck launched Operation Crusader on 18 November 1941 to relieve the garrison.

In the confused fighting that followed, the Eighth Army lost large numbers of tanks, but Rommel’s armoured forces also suffered heavy casualties and supply problems. On 24 November he attempted a wide counterstroke towards the Egyptian frontier—the so-called "dash to the wire"—which overextended his forces and was criticised by the German high command and his own staff. While he advanced into Egypt, Commonwealth troops east of Tobruk endangered his rear. With losses mounting, Rommel withdrew, and on 27 November the British linked up with the Tobruk garrison. By early December he had fallen back to a defensive line at Gazala, just west of Tobruk, under heavy pressure from the Desert Air Force. The British recovered most of Cyrenaica, but his retreat shortened Axis supply lines to El Agheila.

==== Battle of Gazala and capture of Tobruk ====
Receiving new tanks and supplies in January 1942, Rommel launched a counteroffensive from El Agheila on 21 January. Taking the British by surprise, he retook Benghazi on 29 January and forced them back to a defensive line west of Tobruk near Gazala.

Between December 1941 and June 1942, Axis intelligence was aided by detailed reports from US military attaché Bonner Fellers, whose messages were sent in a compromised code. Following Kesselring's temporary neutralisation of Malta in April 1942, supply deliveries improved, and Rommel sought to pre-empt a British offensive. On 26 May he attacked first, starting the Battle of Gazala. The main armoured force swung south and then north behind the British left flank.

After heavy fighting, including a stubborn defence by the Free French at Bir Hakeim until 10 June, the British line collapsed and the Eighth Army began a rapid retreat towards Egypt, dubbed the "Gazala Gallop". Rommel pressed on and assaulted Tobruk on 20 June; the garrison, this time under South African not Australian command, surrendered the next day. Around 32,000 Commonwealth troops were captured, along with substantial supplies and the port itself. Only at the fall of Singapore earlier that year had more British Commonwealth troops been taken prisoner. On 22 June Hitler promoted Rommel to Generalfeldmarschall.

Rommel wished to exploit the victory immediately by advancing into Egypt, aiming at Alexandria and the Suez Canal, which he saw as a decisive strategic objective linking to operations in the Caucasus and Middle East. His success at Tobruk, however, contributed to Hitler’s decision to postpone Operation Herkules, the projected assault on Malta, allowing Allied interdiction of Axis supplies to resume.

Auchinleck relieved Lieutenant General Neil Ritchie of command of the Eighth Army and took over personally. Rommel, aware that delay favoured the British, attacked the new fallback position at Mersa Matruh on 28 June. The fortress fell the next day, and large stocks of fuel, vehicles and equipment were captured, many of which were pressed into Axis service.

==== El Alamein ====
===== First Battle of El Alamein =====
El Alamein and surrounding area

The Eighth Army withdrew to prepared positions near El Alamein, where the sea to the north and the impassable Qattara Depression to the south created a narrow defensive front that could not easily be outflanked. Axis propaganda leaflets, distributed in Egypt and Syria, urged local populations to support Rommel’s advance and portrayed the struggle in strongly antisemitic terms.

The First Battle of El Alamein began on 1 July 1942. Rommel had about 100 operational tanks, and his troops faced a numerically superior enemy with growing air supremacy. Delayed by sandstorms and artillery fire, his attacks made little headway, and by early July he recorded in his diary that his strength had "faded away". Both sides suffered comparable losses during the month, but the Axis supply situation continued to deteriorate, and Rommel recognised that the initiative was slipping away.

In August Auchinleck was replaced by General Harold Alexander as theatre commander, and Bernard Montgomery took over the Eighth Army (after the death of General William Gott in an air attack). Expecting a major British build-up—Rommel knew a large convoy was due in September—he tried to pre-empt it with another attack. He planned an armoured thrust through the southern sector using 15th and 21st Panzer Divisions, 90th Light Division and Italian XX Motorized Corps.

===== Battle of Alam El Halfa =====
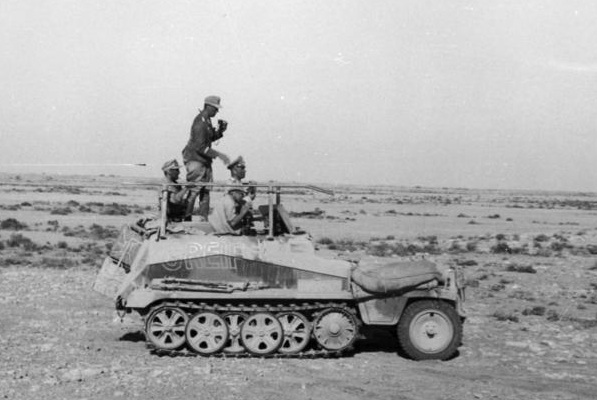
Rommel in a Sd.Kfz. 250/3

The resulting Battle of Alam el Halfa opened on 30 August 1942. Forced by terrain and minefields to repeat a wide sweep to the south, Rommel’s armour became bogged down in unexpected soft ground and came under heavy fire from British artillery and aircraft; Montgomery had even arranged for him to receive a falsified map of the area. By 2 September, with fuel running short and no prospect of outflanking the British, Rommel broke off the attack and withdrew.

A British spoiling attack on 3 September was repulsed by 90th Light Division, and Montgomery chose not to pursue, preferring to conserve strength and train his army for a set-piece offensive. Rommel had suffered nearly 3,000 casualties and lost about 50 tanks, similar numbers of guns and some 400 lorries—losses he could not easily replace—while British losses were lighter except in tanks. He concluded that the war in Africa could no longer be won and, suffering from illness and exhaustion, flew to Germany to recuperate; General Georg Stumme took over command.

===== Second Battle of El Alamein =====
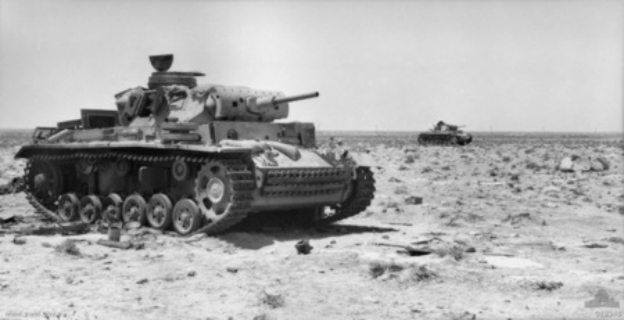
Destroyed Panzer IIIs near Tel el Eisa, 1942

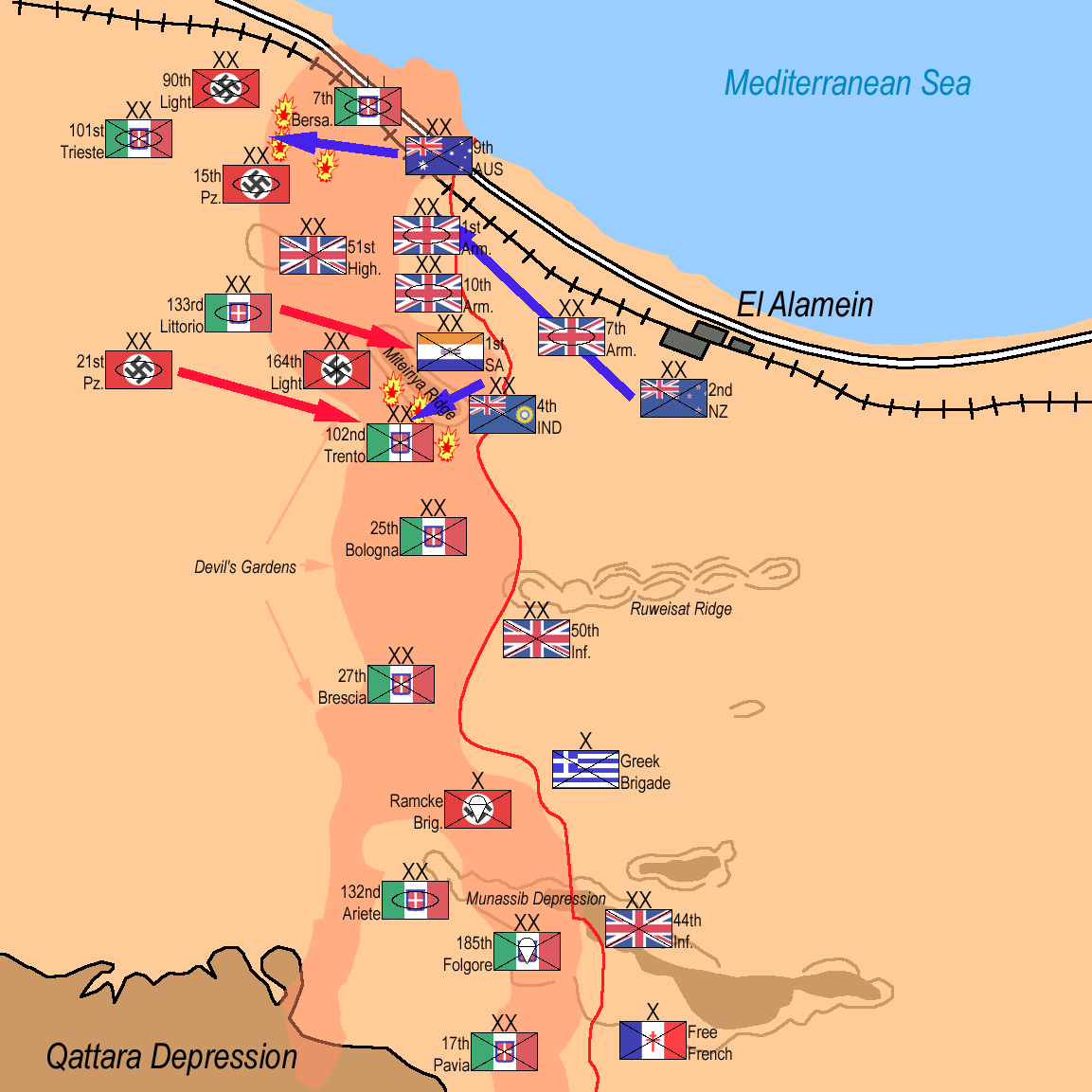
Second Battle of El Alamein. Situation on 28 October 1942

By late 1942 British code-breaking and naval-air interdiction meant that only a fraction of Axis supplies reached North Africa. Mussolini diverted some deliveries to garrisons in Tripoli and refused further reinforcements, leaving Rommel’s forces short of fuel, ammunition and replacements. The Axis defensive line west of El Alamein was anchored on a deep mine belt and prepared infantry positions, behind which armoured reserves were to counterattack any breakthrough.

The British offensive began on 23 October. Stumme died of a heart attack at the front on 24 October, and Rommel, recalled from Germany, resumed command the next day. Montgomery aimed to cut corridors through the northern minefields, then grind down the Axis armour. By 25 October, 15th Panzer Division had only 31 operational tanks left from an initial 119, and Rommel pulled 21st Panzer and the Italian Ariete Division north to reinforce the sector.

After several days of attritional fighting, Rommel had about 150 operational tanks, facing some 800 British tanks, many of them Shermans. On 2 November Montgomery launched "Operation Supercharge" with a massive artillery barrage, breaking through the depleted Axis front. Rommel ordered a withdrawal, but on 3 November Hitler radioed a "stand fast" order, instructing him to hold the line to the last man. Rommel initially complied, but after discussions with Kesselring and other commanders he again ordered a retreat on 4 November, a delay he later called his greatest mistake in Africa. The British 1st and 7th Armoured Divisions broke through and attempted to encircle the retreating Axis forces. That evening Hitler finally authorised withdrawal.

==== End of Africa campaign ====
Rommel conducted a fighting retreat across Libya towards Tunisia, seeking to preserve as many men and vehicles as possible. Heavy rain and temporary grounding of the Desert Air Force occasionally aided his withdrawal, but the Eighth Army’s pressure, together with Allied control of the air and sea, forced him to abandon much Italian equipment and rely increasingly on improvised combat groups. Kesselring criticised the retreat because each abandoned airfield extended Allied air range, but Rommel argued that any attempt to stand and fight would simply lead to encirclement and destruction of his remaining forces.

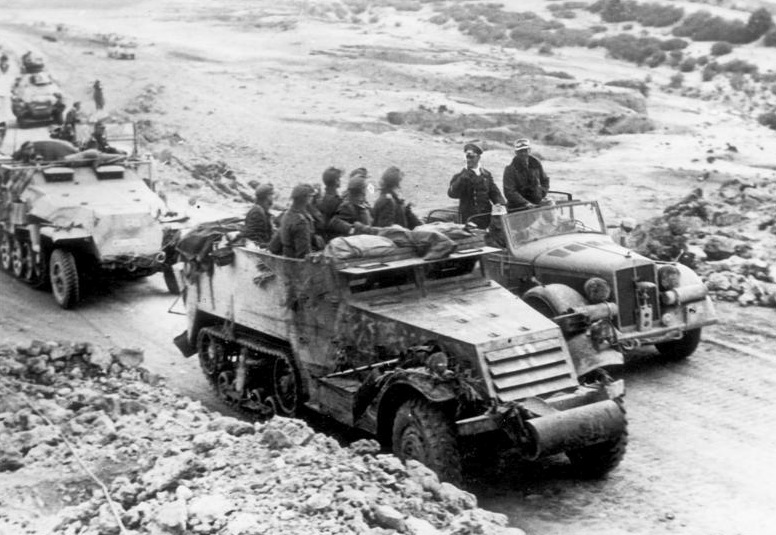
Rommel speaking with troops using a captured American M3 half-track, Tunisia

In Tunisia, Rommel struck at the US II Corps to secure his lines of communication to Tunis, inflicting a sharp defeat at the Battle of Kasserine Pass in February 1943—his first major engagement against American forces and his last significant battlefield victory. He then turned back to face the Eighth Army behind the old French Mareth Line defences on the Libyan–Tunisian border.

While Rommel was at Kasserine, Italian General Giovanni Messe was appointed commander of Panzer Army Africa, now redesignated the Italo–German Panzer Army. Though nominally replacing Rommel, he deferred to him in practice, and on 23 February Army Group Africa was created with Rommel in overall command, including Messe’s army in the south and General Hans-Jürgen von Arnim’s German Fifth Panzer Army in northern Tunisia.

Rommel’s final offensive in North Africa came on 6 March 1943, when he attacked the British Eighth Army at the Battle of Medenine with 10th, 15th and 21st Panzer Divisions. Forewarned by Ultra intercepts, Montgomery had sited strong anti-tank defences along the expected axes of advance. After losing 52 tanks in failed assaults, Rommel broke off the attack. On 9 March he returned to Germany to recover his health and report to Hitler; command of Army Group Africa passed to von Arnim, and Rommel did not return to the African theatre.

=== Italy 1943 ===
On 23 July 1943, Rommel was moved to Greece as commander of Army Group E to counter a possible British invasion. He arrived in Greece on 25 July but was recalled to Berlin the same day following Mussolini's dismissal from office. This caused the German High Command to review the defensive integrity of the Mediterranean and it was decided Rommel should be posted to Italy as commander of the newly formed Army Group B. On 16 August 1943, Rommel's headquarters moved to Lake Garda in north Italy and he assumed command of the group, consisting of the 44th Infantry Division, the 26th Panzer Division and the 1st SS Panzer Division Leibstandarte SS Adolf Hitler. When Italy announced its armistice with the Allies on 8 September, Rommel's group took part in Operation Achse, disarming the Italian forces.

Hitler met with Rommel and Kesselring on 30 September 1943 to discuss operations in Italy. Rommel insisted on a defensive line north of Rome, while Kesselring was more optimistic and advocated holding a line south of Rome. Hitler preferred Kesselring's recommendation, and therefore revoked his decision for the subordination of Kesselring's forces to Rommel's army group. On 19 October, Hitler decided that Kesselring would be the overall commander of the forces in Italy, sidelining Rommel. Rommel had wrongly predicted that the collapse of the German line in Italy would be fast. On 21 November, Hitler moved Rommel and Army Group B to Normandy in France, with responsibility for defending the coast against the anticipated Western Allied invasion.

=== Atlantic Wall 1944 ===
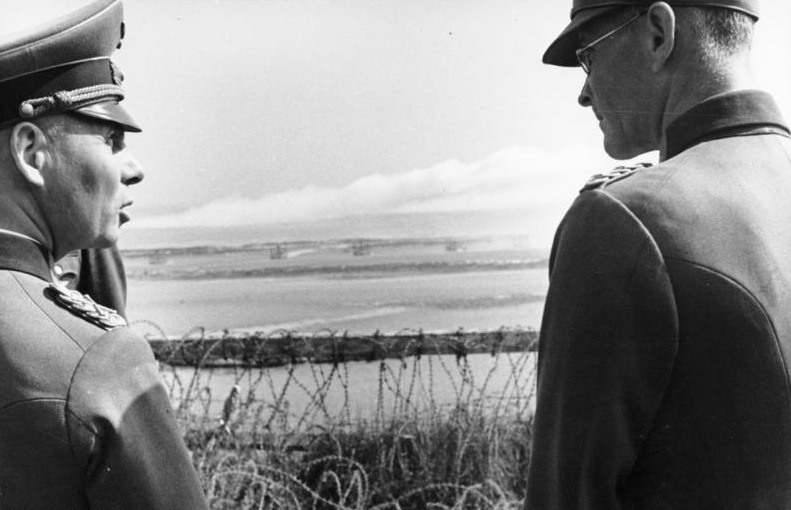
Rommel observes a weapon demonstration at Riva-Bella, just north of Caen in the area that would become Sword Beach in Normandy.

In November 1943 Rommel was appointed General Inspector of the Western Defences, with authority to inspect the Atlantic Wall and recommend improvements. Hitler, who increasingly disagreed with him on military issues, also hoped to use Rommel’s prestige to bolster German morale.

There was sharp disagreement in the German high command over how to meet an Allied landing in France. Commander-in-Chief West, Gerd von Rundstedt, favoured holding the armoured reserves inland near Paris for a concentrated counter-attack, repeating the operational methods of 1940 and in line with practice on the Eastern Front. Rommel, drawing on his North African experience of Allied air superiority, believed German armour would be destroyed before it could assemble and argued that the invasion must be defeated on or very close to the beaches. Rundstedt privately told him the Atlantic Wall was largely a propaganda project.

On arriving in northern France Rommel was dismayed by the state of the defences. Initially only in an inspection role, he pressed his ideas down the chain of command, but encountered resistance from above until January 1944, when he was given command of Army Group B, controlling the 7th and 15th Armies and a coastal strip from the Zuiderzee to the Loire estuary. The command structure remained fragmented: Luftwaffe and Kriegsmarine units answered to their own chiefs, and Rommel needed Hitler’s approval to commit panzer divisions.

Rommel energetically expanded the Atlantic Wall, with millions of mines and extensive beach obstacles, anti-landing stakes (later dubbed Rommel's asparagus), and strengthened strongpoints, including in areas suitable for airborne landings. His staff developed or adapted a wide variety of obstacles to hinder landing craft and armour; Steven Zaloga calls this Rommel’s most important contribution to the defence of Normandy. Shortages of materials, manpower and time meant many positions were unfinished by June 1944, and numerous units were poorly trained or inadequately supplied.

Rundstedt expected the main invasion at the Pas-de-Calais—the shortest route from Britain and closest to Germany. Rommel’s and Hitler’s views shifted, but most senior commanders, influenced by Allied deception operations, ultimately believed that even if landings occurred elsewhere, a second and larger blow would fall in the Calais area. Hitler compromised between the rival strategies, assigning three panzer divisions (2nd, 21st and 116th) to Rommel, four to Rundstedt and others to Army Group G, satisfying no one.

Bad weather in the Channel at the start of June 1944 led German meteorologists to rule out an imminent invasion. On 5 June Rommel travelled to Germany for his wife's fiftieth birthday. When the Allied landings in Normandy began on 6 June, Hitler initially refused to release the armoured reserve, and German commanders hesitated, still suspecting a diversion. Only limited panzer movements were authorised, and heavy Allied air attacks disrupted counter-attacks planned for 7 June. By nightfall on D-Day the Allies had secured five beachheads and landed about 155,000 troops.

As the bridgehead expanded despite strong resistance, Rommel concluded that German forces should withdraw out of range of Allied naval guns, regroup and attempt a counter-attack from a shorter line. He persuaded Rundstedt, but both failed to convince Hitler, who insisted the Wehrmacht hold its positions. At a meeting at the Wolfsschlucht II headquarters near Margival on 17 June, Rommel warned Hitler that the front would collapse, but was brusquely told to concentrate on military operations.

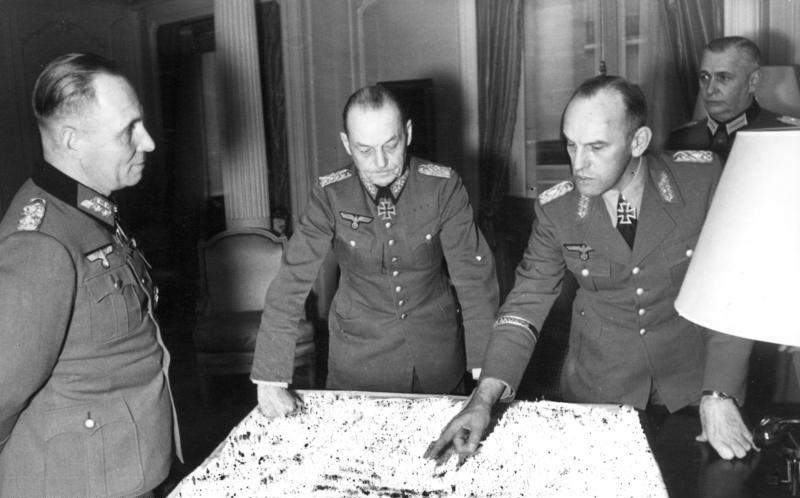
Generalfeldmarschälle Gerd von Rundstedt and Rommel meeting in Paris

By mid-July the German position in Normandy was deteriorating rapidly. On 17 July 1944, while returning from a visit to I SS Panzer Corps headquarters, Rommel’s staff car was strafed by Allied fighters near Sainte-Foy-de-Montgommery. The driver lost control and crashed; Rommel was thrown from the vehicle and suffered severe head and facial injuries, including three skull fractures, which forced his removal from command. Responsibility for the attack has been variously attributed to pilots Charley Fox, Jacques Remlinger and Johannes Jacobus le Roux.

=== Plot against Hitler ===
The extent of Rommel’s involvement in the military resistance against Hitler and the 20 July plot is disputed, as most conspirators were killed and documentation is fragmentary. One important piece of evidence is a conversation recorded by British intelligence in which Heinrich Eberbach, in captivity, recalled Rommel telling him that Hitler and his closest associates had to be killed as the only way out for Germany, a month before Rommel’s forced suicide.

Further evidence comes from the papers of Rudolf Hartmann and Carl-Heinrich von Stülpnagel, discovered in 2018, which include Hartmann’s account of a meeting between Rommel and Stülpnagel in May 1944 and photographs of a gathering of the resistance inner circle with Rommel at Mareil-Marly. According to Hartmann, by late May Rommel was involved in their plans. In a post-war account, Stuttgart mayor Karl Strölin stated that he, Stülpnagel and Alexander von Falkenhausen approached Rommel in early 1944, and Rommel agreed in February to support the resistance.

A meeting of the military resistance's inner circle and Rommel at Mareil-Marly 15 May 1944. From left, Speidel (behind), Rommel (centre), Stülpnagel (front). Rudolf Hartmann stands at left.

On 15 April 1944, Rommel’s new chief of staff, Hans Speidel, arrived in Normandy and reintroduced him to Stülpnagel. The conspirators needed an active field marshal and instructed Speidel to bring Rommel into their circle. Late in May, Speidel met former foreign minister Konstantin von Neurath and Strölin, who advocated opening surrender negotiations with the Western Allies; Speidel later claimed Rommel agreed to further steps in this direction.

At least initially Rommel opposed assassinating Hitler, fearing civil war and a martyr-cult, and instead favoured arrest and trial. He did not attempt to seize Hitler when he visited Margival on 17 June, an operation that would in any case have been highly unlikely to succeed given Hitler’s security and Rommel’s former role in his protection detail. Rommel repeatedly urged Hitler to seek peace with the Western Allies, a stance many historians describe as politically naïve, since the Allies no longer trusted Hitler.

Post-war, Rommel’s widow Lucie resisted linking her husband to the conspiracy, partly because many Germans continued to view the plotters as traitors. At the time, however, the resistance hoped to harness Rommel’s popularity to win over the army and population. Several contemporaries, including Siegfried Westphal, later recalled Rommel’s refusal to accept further “senseless sacrifices”. According to recollections reported by Butler and others, Rommel told Hitler that if he personally stood in the way of peace he should resign or kill himself, but Hitler insisted on continued resistance. Historians note that Rommel’s blunt demands for political solutions were unusual among senior Wehrmacht officers.

On 15 July, Rommel wrote to Hitler giving him what he described as a last chance to end hostilities with the Western Allies and urging him to “draw the proper conclusions without delay”. The letter reached Hitler only after a delay, partly due to Ob. West commander Günther von Kluge’s attempts to shield himself and others in the tense days before and after the 20 July plot. Several senior commanders in the West indicated they would support Rommel, while others, such as Erich von Manstein, rejected approaches but did not inform Hitler.

On 17 July 1944, Rommel was gravely wounded in an Allied air attack, removing him from command just days before the bomb attempt on Hitler. Many authors consider this a crucial blow to the conspirators, who had hoped to rely on him in the West. After the failure of the 20 July plot, mass arrests followed. Rommel was first implicated when the badly injured Stülpnagel repeatedly muttered his name before attempting suicide; under torture, Caesar von Hofacker also named Rommel as involved. Civilian resistance leader Carl Goerdeler had listed Rommel as a potential Reich President, though this plan was never discussed with him.

On 27 September, Martin Bormann submitted a memorandum to Hitler stating that Stülpnagel, Hofacker and other defendants had testified that Rommel knew about the assassination plan and had promised to serve the new government. Gestapo surveillance of Rommel’s home in Ulm followed. Historian Peter Lieb identifies Bormann’s memo, Eberbach’s intercepted conversation and the testimonies of surviving resistance members such as Hartmann as the key sources indicating Rommel’s support for the conspiracy, while acknowledging that some, notably Speidel, had strong post-war motives to emphasise their own roles. Other historians stress that, whatever his precise involvement in the bomb plot, Rommel developed his own plan to end the war in the West and sought, increasingly openly, to bring senior commanders over to his side.

== Death ==
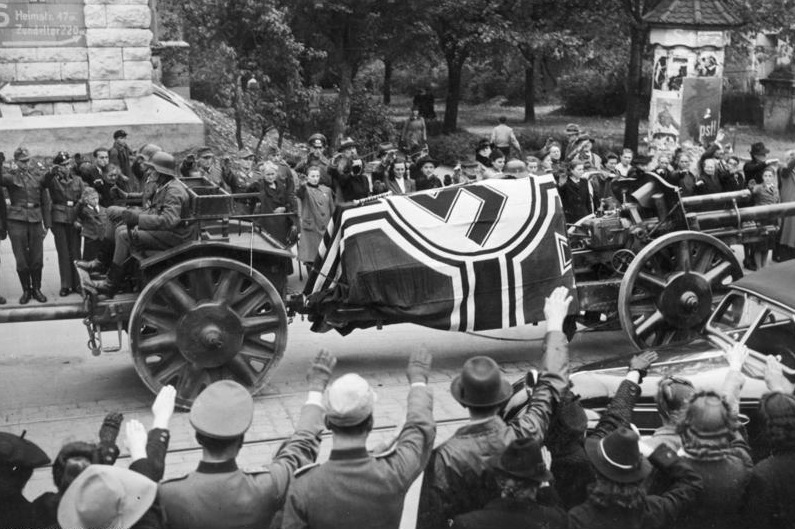
Rommel's funeral procession

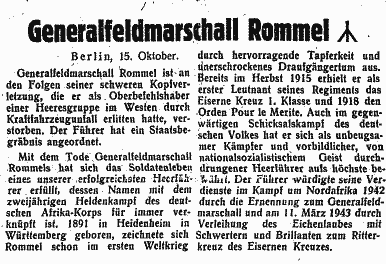
The official announcement of Rommel's death by the Nazi newspaper Bozner Tagblatt, 16 October 1944

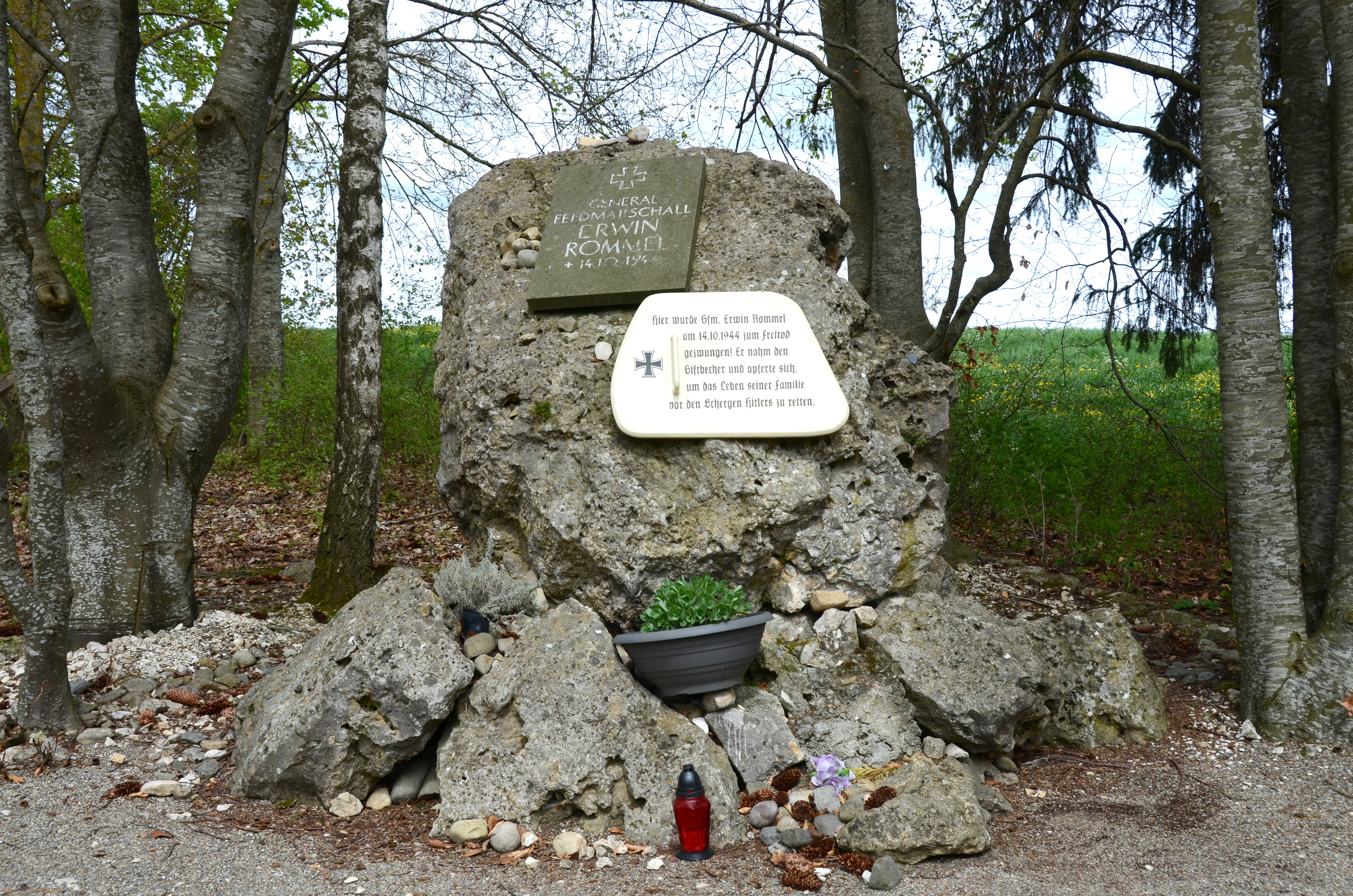
Erwin Rommel Memorial, place of his suicide with a cyanide pill, Herrlingen (2019)

Rommel's case was turned over to the "Court of Military Honour"—a drumhead court-martial convened to decide the fate of officers involved in the conspiracy. The court included Generalfeldmarschalls Wilhelm Keitel and Gerd von Rundstedt, Generaloberst Heinz Guderian, General der Infanterie Walther Schroth and Generalleutnant Karl-Wilhelm Specht, with General der Infanterie Karl Kriebel and Generalleutnant Heinrich Kirchheim (whom Rommel had fired after Tobruk in 1941) as deputy members and Generalmajor Ernst Maisel as protocol officer. The Court acquired information from Speidel, Hofacker and others that implicated Rommel, with Keitel and Ernst Kaltenbrunner assuming he had taken part. Keitel and Guderian then made the decision that favoured Speidel's case and shifted the blame to Rommel. By normal procedure, this would lead to Rommel's being brought to Roland Freisler's People's Court, a kangaroo court that always decided in favour of the prosecution. However, Hitler knew having Rommel executed as a traitor would damage morale on the home front. He decided to offer Rommel the chance to take his own life.

Two generals from Hitler's headquarters, Wilhelm Burgdorf and Ernst Maisel, visited Rommel at his home on 14 October 1944. Burgdorf informed him of the charges and offered him three options: (a) defend himself in front of Hitler in Berlin, (Note: "Burgdorf had with him copies of the interrogations of Hofacker, Stülpnagel and Speidel, along with a letter written by Keitel ostensibly dictated by Hitler himself. In the letter, the Führer gave Rommel an impossible choice: if he believed himself innocent of the allegations against him, then Rommel must report to Hitler in person in Berlin; refusal to do so would be considered an admission of guilt ... There was no mention of Rommel's case first being put to the Wehrmacht's Court of Honor, a curious omission if Rommel were indeed being brought to book as part of Stauffenberg's conspiracy.") or refuse, but this would be taken as admission of guilt; (b) face the People's Court, which would have been tantamount to a death sentence; or (c) choose death by suicide. Under (b), his family would have suffered even before the all-but-certain conviction and execution, and his staff would have been arrested and executed as well. Under (c), the government would claim he died a hero and bury him with military honours, and his family would receive pensions. In support of the suicide option, Burgdorf had brought a cyanide capsule.

Rommel chose suicide, and explained his decision to his wife and son. Wearing his Afrika Korps jacket and carrying his field marshal's baton, he got into Burgdorf's car, driven by SS-Stabsscharführer Heinrich Doose, and was driven out of the village. After stopping, Doose and Maisel walked away from the car leaving Rommel with Burgdorf. Five minutes later Burgdorf gestured to the two men to return, and Doose noticed Rommel was slumped over. He died before being taken to the Wagner-Schule field hospital. Ten minutes later, the group telephoned Rommel's wife to inform her.

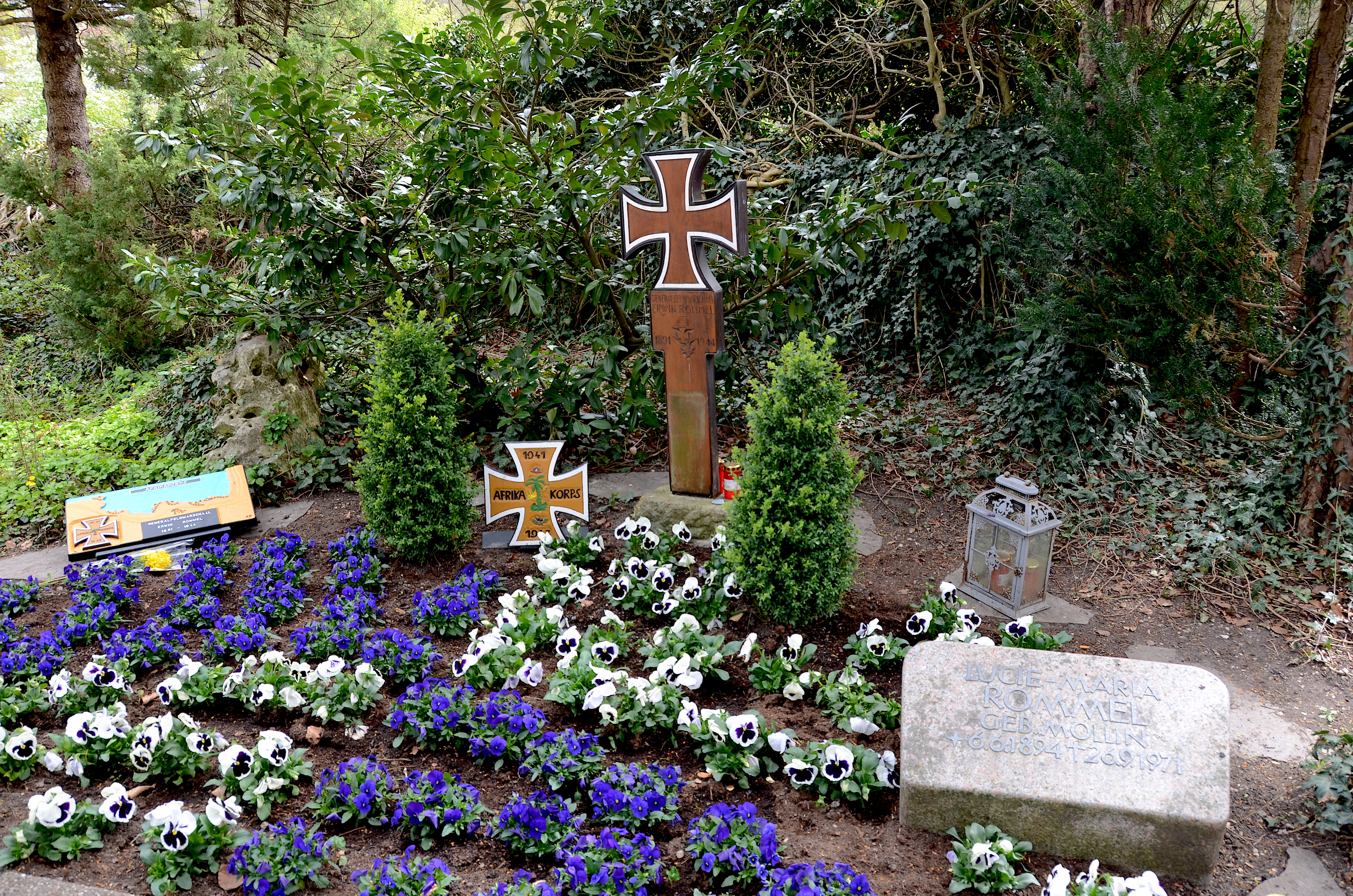
Grave of Erwin Rommel in Herrlingen (2019)

The official notice of Rommel's death reported to the public stated he had died of either a heart attack or cerebral embolism—a complication of the skull fractures he had suffered in the strafing of his staff car. To strengthen the story, Hitler ordered a day of mourning. As promised, Rommel was given a state funeral, but it was held in Ulm instead of Berlin, as had been requested by Rommel. Hitler sent Field Marshal Rundstedt, who was unaware Rommel had died as a result of Hitler's orders, as his representative to the funeral. The truth behind Rommel's death became known to the Allies when intelligence officer Charles Marshall interviewed Rommel's widow, as well as from a letter by Rommel's son Manfred in 1945.

Rommel's grave is located in Herrlingen, a short distance west of Ulm. For decades after the anniversary of his death, veterans of the Africa campaign, including former opponents, would gather at his grave.

== Style as military commander ==
On the Italian front in the First World War, Rommel developed a preference for fast-moving, mobile operations and bold initiative. He concluded that seizing the momentum and denying the enemy time to regroup was key to victory. Some authors argue that many of his early opponents were second-rate, disorganised or depleted, and that his methods proved less effective against well-led and well-equipped forces later in the Second World War. Others note that throughout his career he often fought while outnumbered and outgunned, sometimes overwhelmingly so, and also had to contend with internal opponents in Germany who hoped for his failure.

Rommel is praised by numerous authors as a gifted and charismatic commander. Basil Liddell Hart described him as a strong leader, worshipped by his troops and respected by his adversaries, and considered him one of the "Great Captains of History". Owen Connelly likewise writes that "no better exemplar of military leadership can be found", citing Friedrich von Mellenthin on the close, almost intuitive understanding between Rommel and his men. Hitler, by contrast, remarked that Rommel was a "very great leader" in success but an "absolute pessimist" when difficulties arose. Claus Telp criticises him for advancing the careers of his own officers while ignoring or slighting peers in his reports.

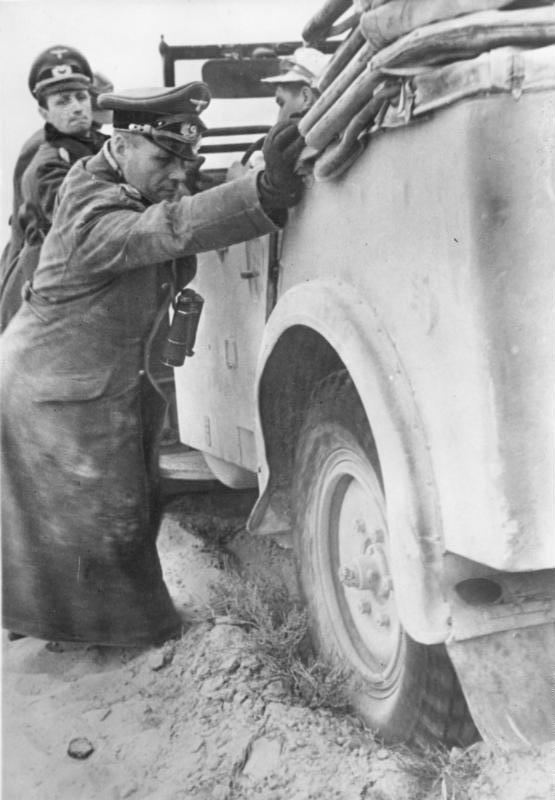
Rommel helping to free his staff car, a Škoda Superb Kfz 21

Surprise and psychological pressure were central to Rommel's approach to offensive warfare. He used sandstorms, darkness and rapid manoeuvre to conceal his movements and unsettle the enemy. He was notably aggressive and often directed operations from the front or flew over the battlefield in a reconnaissance aircraft. When the British mounted Operation Flipper deep behind German lines to kill him and his staff before Operation Crusader, Rommel was indignant that they expected to find his headquarters 400 kilometres (250 miles) behind the front. His habit of personally intervening at the decisive point of battle could, however, leave him out of touch with the wider situation: Mellenthin cites his counterattack during Operation Crusader as an example. Butler agrees that, although leading from the front inspired his troops, Rommel carried it to such extremes—sometimes directing individual companies or battalions—that communication and coordination suffered and his own life was put at unnecessary risk. Albert Kesselring complained that Rommel "cruised about the battlefield" like a divisional or corps commander rather than an army leader, but his staff officers Gause and Westphal argued that in the African desert this method was often the only way to command effectively. His staff admired his dedication but complained about his austere, almost Spartan lifestyle, which they felt made their tasks harder and reduced his effectiveness.

During the 1940 campaign in France, Rommel's leadership of the 7th Panzer Division attracted both praise and criticism. Officers such as General Georg Stumme, who had previously commanded the division, were impressed by the speed and success of its advance. Others, including his corps commander Kluge, considered his decisions impulsive and accused him of claiming excessive credit, for example by presenting misleading diagrams or failing to acknowledge the contribution of other units, particularly the Luftwaffe. His division took heavy casualties, but in exchange for 2,160 men and 42 tanks lost, it captured more than 100,000 prisoners and destroyed or seized about 450 tanks, vehicles and guns.

Rommel spoke German with a marked southern German, or Swabian, accent and did not belong to the Prussian aristocracy that dominated the German high command, which made him something of an outsider to the traditional power structure. He believed a commander should be physically more robust than his troops and lead by example. (Note: According to Lewin, in 1933 when Rommel became commander of a Hanoverian Jäger battalion of experienced skiers, the officers tested him on the slopes. With no ski lift available, the men climbed the hill and skied down once, after which honour would normally have been satisfied. Rommel, then 41, led them up and down twice more before dismissing them.) He expected his subordinate commanders to display similar stamina.

Personally, Rommel was direct, unbending and often brusque with both superiors and subordinates, and he could be disobedient to Hitler when he felt orders were impractical or harmful, while remaining gentle and diplomatic with lower-ranking soldiers. Despite his willingness to work with propaganda photographers and journalists, he was personally shy, introverted and stiff in manner even with his closest aides, judging people primarily on merit. He could, however, show strong loyalty and warmth to a small circle of trusted individuals, including Hitler in the earlier years of their relationship.

=== Relationship with Italian forces ===
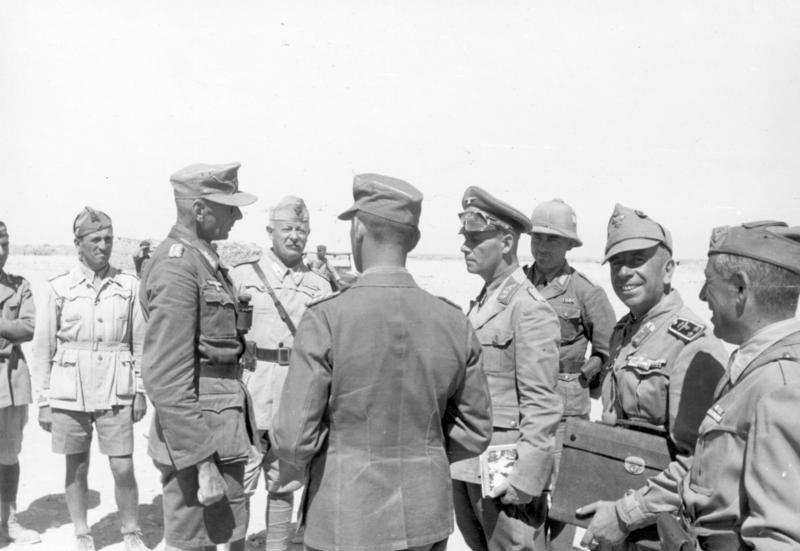
Rommel with German and Italian officers, 1942

Rommel’s relationship with the Italian high command in North Africa was tense. Although nominally subordinate to them, he exercised wide autonomy and directed both German and Italian formations, creating friction, especially over supplies, which Italian authorities tended to prioritise for their own units. Rommel's blunt style did little to ease matters. Italian commanders, though generally less aggressive than Rommel, were often capable logisticians and artillery tacticians, and their troops—despite poor equipment—were usually well trained. Disputes over supply and priorities were frequent, and Kesselring’s attempt to improve cooperation produced limited success; he later complained that Rommel ignored him much as he ignored the Italians.

Italian assessments of Rommel varied widely. Some senior officers criticised him or used him as a scapegoat, while others sought to appropriate parts of the Rommel myth; most, however, found his emotional and chaotic leadership difficult to work with. Among rank-and-file troops he enjoyed a stronger reputation and “became sort of a myth”. Rommel himself rated Italian soldiers more highly than their leaders and, unlike many German officers, was generally described as “kindly disposed” towards Italians as a people. By contrast, James J. Sadkovich cites cases of Rommel refusing cooperation, abandoning Italian units and blaming them for his own failures, characterising him as “arrogantly ethnocentric”.

=== Views on the conduct of war ===
==== Combat ====
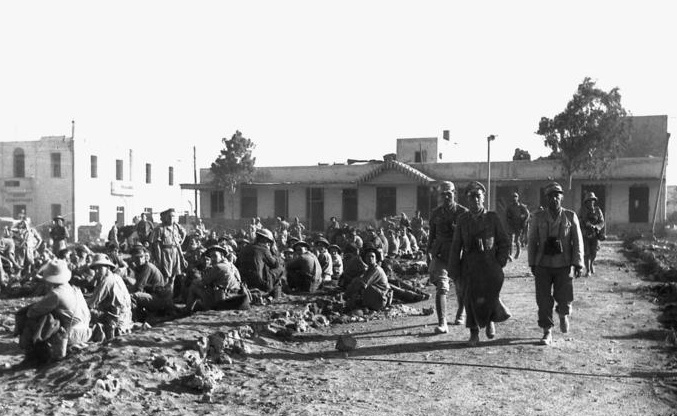
Rommel walks past Allied prisoners taken at Tobruk, 1942

Many authors describe Rommel as a chivalrous and professionally minded officer who generally tried to observe the customary laws of war and who won the respect of both his troops and many of his enemies. This reputation has led some commentators to contrast him with more ideologically driven Nazi commanders, though others argue that it forms part of a post-war "clean Wehrmacht" image that needs careful scrutiny.

During Operation Achse, the German disarmament of Italian forces after the Armistice of Cassibile in 1943, harsh orders signed by Rommel and Kesselring contributed to brutal behaviour elsewhere. Gerhard Schreiber quotes their directive that "sentimentality" towards former Italian allies was misplaced and that those fighting against German troops "shall experience toughness". He interprets this as a hate-filled order aimed primarily at Italian soldiers rather than partisans and argues that it helped brutalise the campaign. Remy cautions against taking the order out of context, noting that disarmament in Rommel's sector occurred largely without major bloodshed and that Rommel insisted Italian prisoners be treated on the same footing as German civilians. Peter Lieb similarly concludes that the order did not significantly radicalise the war in Rommel's area of responsibility, although Italian internees were subsequently deported to Germany for forced labour, something Rommel is not believed to have known about. Historian Dennis Showalter comments that Rommel was not directly involved in the anti-partisan war in Italy, but that orders prescribing death for Italian soldiers captured in arms or civilians sheltering escaped prisoners suggest he might not have behaved fundamentally differently from many of his Wehrmacht contemporaries.

Lieb and others argue that Rommel repeatedly refused to carry out illegal orders, most notably Hitler's Commando Order instructing the execution of captured Allied commandos, which he did not pass on to his subordinates. Units under his command reported treating such captives as regular prisoners of war, and it is likely he behaved similarly in North Africa. Historian Szymon Datner suggests that Rommel may have wished to keep Nazi atrocities hidden from the Western Allies. Remy argues that although Rommel heard rumours about massacres while in Africa, his personality and circumstances meant he was not fully confronted with the scale of Nazi crimes until 1944. When he learned of atrocities committed by the Leibstandarte in Italy in 1943, he reportedly forbade his son from joining the Waffen-SS.

==== Attitude toward colonial troops ====
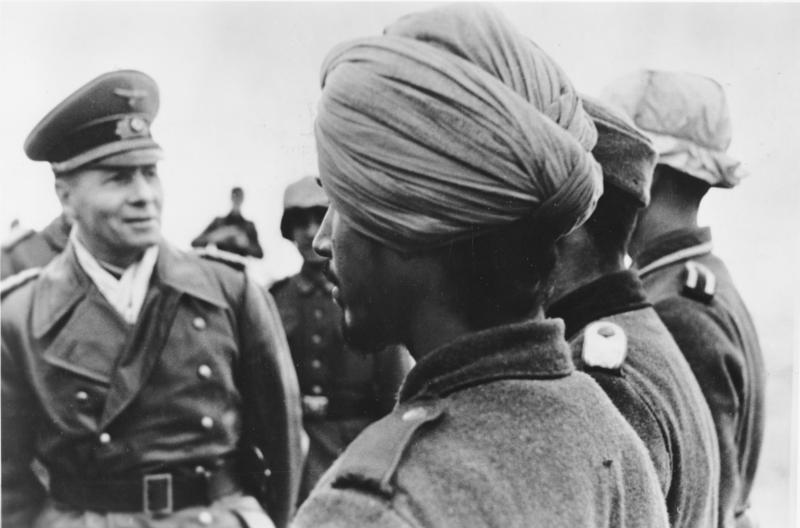
Rommel inspecting a unit of the German Indian Legion in France, February 1944

French colonial troops were depicted in Nazi propaganda as symbols of French decadence, and several historians argue that Rommel shared some of the racial attitudes common among German officers of his time. Myron Echenberg writes that he, like Hitler, regarded black French soldiers with particular disdain. Ward Rutherford and Vaughn Raspberry present him as considering non-European troops, especially black Africans and Indians, to belong to "inferior races" and resenting their use against German forces.

Other authors emphasise a more complex picture. Bruce Watson notes that whatever racist assumptions Rommel initially brought to the desert war, they eroded when he encountered the effectiveness of units such as the 4th Indian Division, whose fighting qualities he later praised. Initially reluctant to employ Indian volunteers captured from Allied units under his command, he later visited the Indian Legion in France, commended their performance and supported their integration despite prejudice within the Wehrmacht.

Reports from black South African prisoners of war describe Rommel ordering that they be housed and queued for food together with white prisoners, telling them that brave soldiers should be treated alike. Accounts from veterans of the 28th Māori Battalion suggest that, although Rommel complained that some of their tactics violated European norms, he generally treated captured Māori soldiers fairly and expressed respect for their combat skills. Historian Ralf Georg Reuth argues that Rommel tried to ensure correct treatment of colonial prisoners within his command, while distancing himself from Hitler's racist war in the East and maintaining an idealised, selective view of the Führer.

== Reputation as a military commander ==
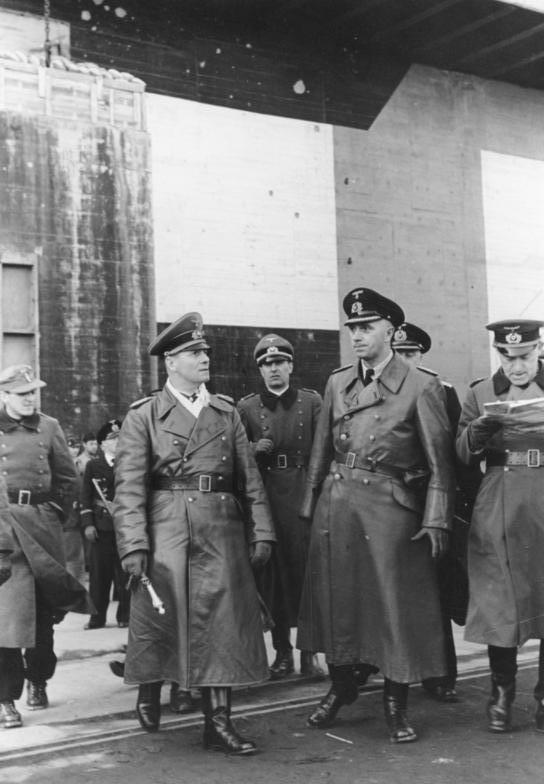
Rommel and Vice Admiral Friedrich Ruge visiting the U-boat base in La Rochelle, France, February 1944

Rommel was famous in his lifetime, including among adversaries. His tactical prowess and decency in the treatment of Allied prisoners earned him the respect of opponents including Claude Auchinleck, Archibald Wavell, George S. Patton, and Bernard Montgomery.

Rommel's military reputation has been controversial. While military practitioners acknowledge Rommel's excellent tactical skills and bravery, some, such as US major general David T. Zabecki, consider Rommel's performance as an operational level commander to be overstated and other officers agree. (Note: According to Zabecki, Rommel's insubordination also played a role, leading to a calamitous misuse of resources when Rommel went over the head of his superior, Field Marshal Albert Kesselring, to appeal directly to Hitler to approve an assault on Egypt instead of occupying Malta, as Kesselring and OKW were planning.) General Klaus Naumann agrees with historian Charles Messenger that Rommel's violation of the unity of command principle, bypassing chain of command, was unacceptable and contributed to failure in North Africa. (Note: Naumann: "Rommel's way out in Africa—bypassing the chain of command by seeking direct access to Hitler—must never be taken as an example to be followed." This allowed him to achieve some tactical victories, but this contributed to eventual operational and strategic failure in North Africa.) Biographer Wolf Heckmann describes Rommel as "the most overrated commander of an army...".

Nevertheless, there are many officers who admire his methods, like Norman Schwarzkopf who described Rommel as a genius at battles of movement saying "Look at Rommel. Look at North Africa, the Arab-Israeli wars, and all the rest of them. A war in the desert is a war of mobility and lethality. It's not a war where straight lines are drawn in the sand and [you] say, 'I will defend here or die." Ariel Sharon deemed the military model used by Rommel superior that used by Montgomery. His compatriot Moshe Dayan considered Rommel a model and icon. Wesley Clark states that "Rommel's military reputation...has lived on, and still sets the standard for a style of daring, charismatic leadership to which most officers aspire." During later desert wars, Rommel's theories attracted interest from policymakers and military instructors. Chinese military leader Sun Li-jen had the laudatory nickname "Rommel of the East". Certain military historians are sceptical of Rommel as an operational, let alone strategic level commander. They point to Rommel's lack of appreciation for Germany's strategic situation, his misunderstanding of the relative importance of his theatre to German High Command, poor grasp of logistical realities, and, according to Ian Beckett, "penchant for glory hunting". Citino credits Rommel's limitations as an operational level commander as "materially contributing" to the demise of the Axis in Africa, (Note: Robert Citino: "[Rommel's] disinterest in the dreary science of logistics, his love of action, his tendency to fly off to wherever the fighting was hottest—all of these qualities (...) are problems in a commander under modern conditions, and they all contributed materially to the disaster that ultimately befell him and his army in the desert.") while Addington focuses on the struggle over strategy, whereby Rommel's initial brilliant success resulted in "catastrophic effects" for Germany in Africa. Porch highlights Rommel's "offensive mentality", symptomatic of Wehrmacht commanders as a whole, that tactical and operational victories would lead to strategic success.

Geoffrey P. Megargee points out Rommel's playing German and Italian command structures against each other to his advantage. Rommel used the confused structure—the High command of the Wehrmacht, the OKH (Supreme High Command of the Army) and Comando Supremo (Italian Supreme Command)—to disregard orders he disagreed with, or appeal to whatever authority would be most sympathetic to his requests.

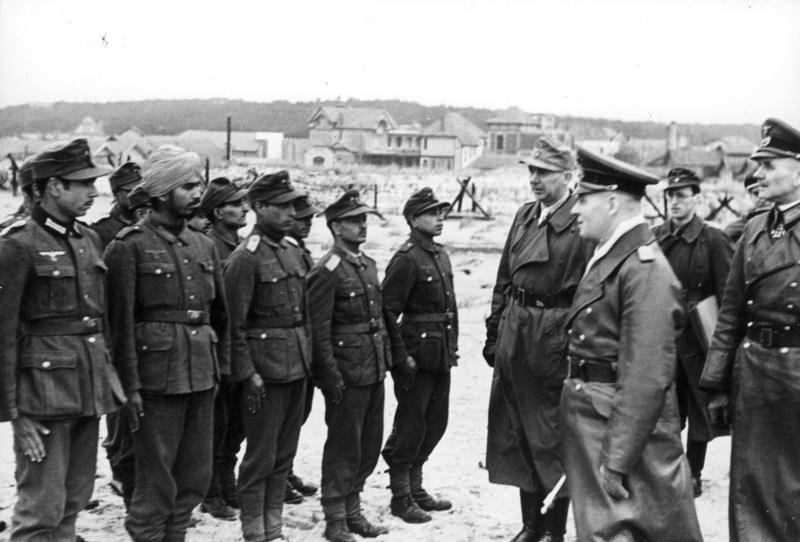
Inspecting the soldiers of the anti-British Free India Legion, France, 1944

Some historians take issue with Rommel's absence from Normandy on the day of the Allied invasion. He left France on 5 June and was home on the 6th celebrating his wife's birthday. According to Rommel, he planned to see Hitler the next day to discuss the invasion situation. Zabecki calls his decision to leave the theatre in view of imminent invasion "an incredible lapse of command responsibility". Lieb remarks that Rommel displayed mental agility, but the lack of an energetic commander, which caused the battle not to be conducted in his way, though the result was still better than Geyr's plan. Lieb opines that while his harshest critics often said Rommel was overrated or not suitable for higher commands, envy was a big factor.

T.L. McMahon argues that while Rommel no doubt possessed operational vision, he did not have the strategic resources to effect his operational choices. While his forces provided the tactical ability to accomplish his goals, the German system was designed for commanders who led from the front, and he might have chosen the same options as Montgomery had he been put in the same conditions. Tactical flexibility was an advantage of the German system, but in the final years of the war, Hitler, Himmler and Goering had usurped more authority at the strategic level, leaving professionals like Rommel constrained. Martin Blumenson considers Rommel had a compelling view of strategy and logistics, demonstrated through his many arguments with superiors, although Blumenson thinks that what distinguished Rommel was his boldness and intuitive feel for the battlefield. Schwarzkopf comments "Rommel had a feel for the battlefield like no other..."

Joseph Forbes comments: "The complex, conflict-filled interaction between Rommel and his superiors over logistics, objectives and priorities should not be used to detract from Rommel's reputation as a remarkable military leader", because Rommel was not given powers over logistics, and because if only generals who attain strategic goals are great, such highly regarded commanders as Robert E. Lee, Hannibal, and Charles XII would be excluded. General Siegfried Storbeck of the Bundeswehr, remarks that, Rommel's leadership style and offensive thinking, although carrying risks like losing overview of the situation and creating overlapping authority, have been proved effective, and been analysed and incorporated in the training of officers by "us, our Western allies, the Warsaw Pact, and even the Israel Defense Forces". Maurice Remy defends his strategic decision regarding Malta as, although risky, the only logical choice. (Note: Remy: Kesselring, ... in his memoirs that criticises the five-year younger and much more popular Rommel, ... he already knew at least since the war's end about American arms shipment and intention to intervene which would render the strategical value of Malta meaningless, that left Rommel only one choice ...)

Rommel was among the few Axis commanders targeted for assassination by Allied planners. Two attempts were made, the first was Operation Flipper in North Africa in 1941, and the second was Operation Gaff in Normandy in 1944. Research by Norman Ohler claims Rommel's behaviour was heavily influenced by Pervitin which he took in heavy doses. Ohler refers to him as "the Crystal Fox"—playing off the nickname "Desert Fox".

== Debate about atrocities ==
=== Executions of prisoners and forced labour in France ===
Rommel ordered the execution of a French officer who refused three times to cooperate when taken prisoner; accounts differ on whether this was justified. Caddick-Adams and Petitfrère see the act as legally problematic while others stress that the prisoner refused to surrender, with Telp writing that Rommel was normally considerate to prisoners.

Raffael Scheck points out that, although no direct evidence implicates Rommel personally, his 7th Panzer Division operated in areas where massacres of black French prisoners of war were frequent. Daniel Butler considers it possible that killings occurred in actions such as Le Quesnoy, but argues that existing evidence does not prove Rommel ordered or condoned them and that his own wording about enemy troops being "wiped out or forced to withdraw" has been overinterpreted. Rommel later protested the Oradour-sur-Glane massacre.

Construction of the Atlantic Wall was formally the responsibility of the Organisation Todt, but Rommel took a close interest in strengthening the defences. He objected to the use of slave labour and suggested that French civilians should be recruited and paid proper wages, yet in practice French civilians and Italian prisoners of war were also forced by Vichy authorities, the Todt Organisation and SS units to work on defences he requested, often in very harsh conditions.

=== Treatment of Jews and other civilians in North Africa ===
Rolf-Dieter Müller notes that the desert war, although bloody, differed from the genocidal campaign in eastern Europe, as fighting was concentrated along a narrow coastal strip and affected fewer civilians. Dennis Showalter observes that both sides initially tried to wage a comparatively "clean" war, a 'war without hate', as Rommel put it in his reflections. Showalter cites the relative absence of civilians and Nazi political units, and the dominance of pre-war professional officers, though he stresses this did not mean the campaign was free of brutality.

Patrick Bernhard argues that the North African campaign was "anything but war without hate", documenting rapes, ill-treatment and executions of prisoners, racially motivated killings of Arabs, Berbers and Jews, and the establishment of labour and detention camps. He shows that anti-Jewish and anti-Arab violence increased when Rommel and Ettore Bastico regained territory in 1941 and 1942, and that German officers representing Rommel urged Italian authorities to use whatever measures were necessary to suppress resistance in the rear areas. According to Bernhard, Rommel did not intervene against reprisals and thus became complicit in war crimes by effectively granting a free hand to Italian forces. Gershom Gorenberg similarly concludes that whether Rommel’s motivation was ideological or purely pragmatic, his demand for quiet rear areas enabled hangings and other abuses.

Other historians emphasise the wider institutional context. Joachim Käppner and Richard J. Evans note that units of the Afrika Korps and other German forces in North Africa committed war crimes, including the rape of Jewish women and killings linked to the broader framework of the Holocaust. Christopher Gabel cautions that attempts to portray Rommel as a war criminal solely by association have not produced clear evidence of his direct knowledge of specific atrocities. The documentary Rommels Krieg similarly concludes that, even if Rommel was unaware of crimes, his military successes created the conditions for forced labour, torture and robbery and thus formed part of Hitler's ideological war. Hein Klemann argues that Afrika Korps requisitions and confiscations in its "foraging zone" endangered the survival of local civilians in a manner comparable to Wehrmacht economic practices in eastern Europe.

The United States Holocaust Memorial Museum describes Rommel’s relationship to the proposed Einsatzkommando Egypt as "problematic". An SS unit under Walter Rauff was to be attached to his command to murder Jews in North Africa and Palestine should German forces advance into the Middle East. Rommel’s staff were visited by Rauff in 1942, and Rommel was aware that such planning was underway, although the Einsatzkommando was never activated and smaller SS detachments carried out killings independently.

Klaus-Michael Mallmann and Martin Cüppers discuss a post-war CIA report that portrays Rommel as having angrily rejected Rauff’s proposals, but they argue that the meeting described could not have taken place as stated, since Rommel and Rauff were in different locations at the time. Rauff’s unit was later redirected to Greece and then withdrawn to Germany as the Axis position in Africa deteriorated. Jean-Christoph Caron finds no evidence that Rommel knew of, or would have supported, the SS mission, and concludes that he bore no direct responsibility for SS looting of Jewish property in Tunisia. Haim Saadon and others argue that Rauff’s surviving papers point primarily to plans for forced labour rather than systematic extermination, and that by the time labour camps were fully established in Tunisia Rommel was already in retreat and had no contact with the Einsatzkommando. A Haaretz investigation, drawing on additional declassified material, accepts that Rommel probably objected to Rauff’s proposals and suggests that his attitude may have somewhat moderated German policy towards Jews and other civilians in North Africa.

Marvin Perry and Jan Friedmann note that the Axis bridgehead in Tunisia enabled the creation of a network of forced-labour camps where around 2,500 Tunisian Jews died during six months of German rule, with regular Wehrmacht units also involved in abuses. Caddick-Adams and Ben H. Shepherd emphasise that most SS activity in Tunisia took place when Rommel was already withdrawing and that no Waffen-SS units served directly under his command in Africa. Wolfgang Mährle argues that Rommel's role as a Generalfeldmarschall in a criminal war is undeniable, but that this alone does not fully define his personal attitudes or all of his actions.

Martin Kitchen suggests that the Afrika Korps’ reputation was partly shaped by circumstance: the sparsely populated desert limited opportunities for ethnic cleansing; German forces never reached the large Jewish communities of Egypt and Palestine; and in Tunisia and Tripolitania the Italian authorities often constrained German efforts against Jews who were Italian citizens. Nevertheless, many North African Jews later believed that Rommel’s failure to break through to Egypt and Palestine had spared them from the "Final Solution". Curtis and Remy estimate that around 120,000 Jews lived in Algeria, 200,000 in Morocco and about 80,000 in Tunisia during the war; of these, several thousand were subjected to forced labour and other forms of persecution, particularly in Tunisia and Libya.

Some authors highlight cases where Rommel appears to have opposed or ignored Nazi racial policy. Shepherd notes that he complained to Italian authorities about indiscriminate reprisals against Arabs, arguing that punishing civilians without identifying the perpetrators was neither just nor militarily useful. Several sources state that he refused to implement Hitler’s directives to kill Jewish prisoners of war. Bryan Mark Rigg argues that the Afrika Korps was relatively lenient in applying racial laws to soldiers of partial Jewish descent, citing officers such as Horst von Oppenfeld and Fritz Bayerlein who served under Rommel without being dismissed, although he concedes that this may also reflect gaps in enforcement rather than deliberate protection.

=== Alleged treasure and spoils ===
Stories linking Rommel to the plunder of Jewish property in Tunisia are often grouped under the label "Rommel's treasure" or "Rommel's gold". Michael FitzGerald and Jean-Christoph Caron argue that such stories are better described as "Rauff's gold": SS units under Walter Rauff looted Jewish property in Tunisia, and later rumours placed part of this loot in Corsica, where Rauff served in 1943, but there is no evidence that Rommel was involved. According to Caron and Jörg Müllner, the legend originated with an SS veteran who produced a false treasure map after the war; Rommel's name became attached simply because of his fame as commander in North Africa.

Rick Atkinson criticises Rommel for accepting a looted stamp collection and a villa taken from Jewish owners. Other authors note that Rommel reacted angrily when he discovered SS looting and abuses in Italy and that the villa in question was only made available to his family after their own house had been destroyed, without being transferred to their ownership. Rommel was one of the few senior officers who declined the large landed estates and cash gifts with which Hitler rewarded many of his generals.

== In Nazi and Allied propaganda ==
In the beginning, although Hitler and Goebbels took notice of Rommel, the elites had no intention of creating one war hero, partly out of fear he would offset Hitler, generating propaganda campaigns for not only Rommel but also Gerd von Rundstedt, Walther von Brauchitsch, Eduard Dietl, and Sepp Dietrich. Nevertheless, several factors—including Rommel's unusual charisma, (Note: Remy:"On 8 August 1914, ... Rommel discovered that he had unusual charisma ... This effect (he had on the troops) would become the fundamental element of Mythos Rommel.",) (Note: Der Spiegel: "The Wehrmacht had many capable generals ... but none had the charisma of the Swabian with that distinctive round head.") his talents in military matters and public relations, (Note: Majdalany: Rommel was, among other things, clever at public relations.), the efforts of Goebbels's propaganda machine, and the Allies' participation in mythologising him (either for political benefits, sympathy for someone who evoked a romantic archetype, or genuine admiration for his actions)—gradually contributed to Rommel's fame. Spiegel wrote, "Even back then his fame outshone that of all other commanders."

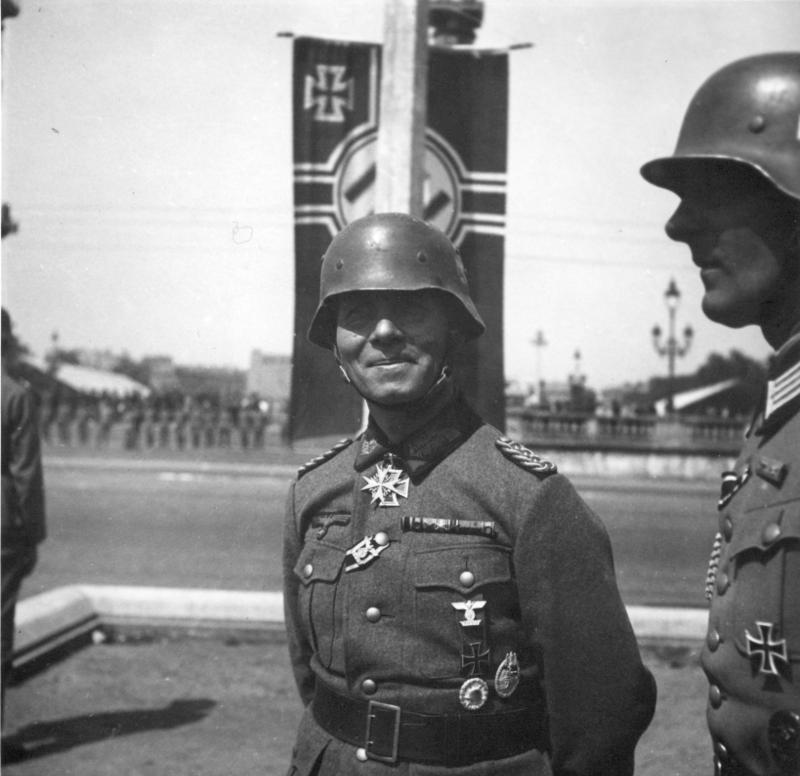
Rommel at a Paris victory parade (June 1940). Rommel had access to Reich Minister of Propaganda Joseph Goebbels via senior propaganda official Karl Hanke, who served under Rommel during the 1940 campaign.

Rommel's victories in France were featured in the German press and the February 1941 film Sieg im Westen (Victory in the West), in which Rommel helped direct a segment reenacting the crossing of the Somme River. While there is no evidence of Rommel committing crimes, during the shooting of the movie, African prisoners of war were forced to take part in its making and carry out humiliating acts. Stills from the re-enactment are found in the "Rommel Collection"; it was filmed by Hans Ertl, assigned to this task by Kurt Hesse, a friend of Rommel, who worked for Wehrmacht Propaganda Section V. Rommel's victories in 1941 were played up by Nazi propaganda, even though his successes in Africa were in one of Germany's least important theatres. (Note: Niall Barr: "... came to fame in a theatre which held almost no strategic interest for Hitler whatsoever."(Barr 2014, p. 60). Martin Kitchen: "German historians have largely ignored the North African campaign, not only because it was peripheral ..."(Kitchen 2009, p. 9).) In November 1941, Goebbels wrote about "the urgent need" to have Rommel "elevated to a kind of popular hero." Rommel, with his innate abilities as a commander and love of the spotlight, was a perfect fit for the role Goebbels designed.

=== Successes in North Africa ===
Rommel received help in cultivating his image from Alfred Ingemar Berndt, an official at the Reich Propaganda Ministry who had volunteered for military service. Seconded by Goebbels, Berndt was assigned to Rommel's staff and became a close aide. Berndt acted as a liaison between Rommel, the Propaganda Ministry, and the Führer Headquarters. He directed Rommel's photo shoots and filed radio dispatches describing the battles.

In the spring of 1941, Rommel's name began to appear in the British media. In the autumn of 1941 and the subsequent winter, he was mentioned almost daily. Toward the end of the year, the Reich propaganda machine used Rommel's successes in Africa as a diversion from the Wehrmacht's challenging situation with the stall of Operation Barbarossa. (Note: Peter Caddick-Adams: "Rommel's advances over the winter 1941–42 became a very useful distraction away from Germany's failure before Moscow.") The American press soon began to take notice of Rommel, following the country's entry into the war in December 1941, writing that "The British...admire him because he beat them and were surprised to have beaten in turn such a capable general." General Auchinleck distributed a directive to his commanders seeking to dispel the notion that Rommel was a "superman". Rommel, no matter how hard the situation was, made an effort to spend time with soldiers and patients, his own and POWs, which contributed greatly to his reputation of not only being a great commander but "a decent chap".

The attention of the Western press thrilled Goebbels, who wrote in his diary in early 1942: "Rommel continues to be the recognized darling of even the enemies' news agencies." The Field Marshal was pleased by the media attention, although he knew the downsides. (Note: Quote from one of Rommel's letters, January 1942: "The opinion of me in the world press has improved.") Hitler took note of the British propaganda, commenting in summer 1942 that Britain's leaders must have hoped "to be able to explain their defeat to their own nation more easily by focusing on Rommel".

Rommel was the commander most frequently covered in German media and the only one to be given a press conference, in October 1942. It was moderated by Goebbels and attended by domestic and foreign media. Rommel declared: "Today we (...) have the gates of Egypt in hand, and with the intent to act!" Keeping the focus on Rommel distracted the public from Wehrmacht losses elsewhere as the tide of the war turned. He became a symbol to reinforce the public's faith in ultimate Axis victory.

=== Military reverses ===
In the wake of the successful British offensive in November 1942 and other military reverses, the Propaganda Ministry directed the media to emphasise Rommel's invincibility. The charade was maintained until spring 1943, even as the German situation in Africa became increasingly precarious. To ensure the inevitable defeat in Africa would not be associated with Rommel, Goebbels had the Army High Command announce in May 1943 that Rommel was on a two-month leave for health reasons. (Note: Peter Lieb: "Hitler was well aware that it would be unwise [...] to link the downfall of Army Group Africa to the name of Rommel, the child of Joseph Goebbel's propaganda machinery.") Instead, the campaign was presented by Berndt, who resumed his role in the Propaganda Ministry, as a ruse to tie down the British while Germany was turning Europe into an impenetrable fortress with Rommel at the helm. After the radio programme ran in May 1943, Rommel sent Berndt a case of cigars as a sign of his gratitude.

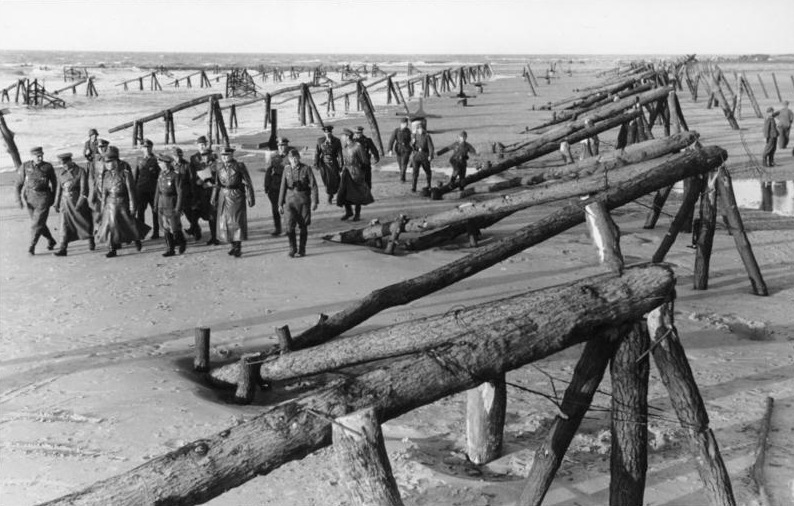
One of the many propaganda photographs of Rommel on inspection tours of the Atlantic Wall

Although Rommel then entered a period without a significant command, he remained a household name in Germany, synonymous with the aura of invincibility. Hitler made Rommel part of his defensive strategy for Fortress Europe by sending him to inspect the Atlantic Wall. Goebbels supported the decision, noting in his diary that Rommel was "undoubtedly the suitable man". The propaganda minister expected the move to reassure the German public and have a negative impact on the Allied forces' morale.

In France, a Wehrmacht propaganda company frequently accompanied Rommel on his inspection trips to document his work for domestic and foreign audiences. In May 1944 German newsreels reported on Rommel's speech at a Wehrmacht conference, where he stated his conviction that "every single German soldier will make his contribution against the Anglo-American spirit that it deserves for its criminal and bestial air war campaign against our homeland." The speech led to an upswing in morale and sustained confidence in Rommel.

When Rommel was seriously wounded in July 1944, the Propaganda Ministry attempted to conceal this so as not to undermine morale. Despite this, the news leaked to the British press. To counteract the rumours of a serious injury and even death, Rommel was required to appear at a 1 August press conference. On 3 August, the German press published an official report that Rommel had been injured in a car accident. Rommel noted in his diary his dismay at this twisting of the truth, belatedly realising how much Reich propaganda was using him.

=== Rommel's views on propaganda ===
Rommel was interested in propaganda beyond the promotion of his image. In 1944, after visiting Rommel in France and reading his proposals on counteracting Allied propaganda, Alfred-Ingemar Berndt remarked: "He is also interested in this propaganda business and wants to develop it by all means. He has even thought and brought out practical suggestions for each program and subject."

Rommel saw the propaganda and education values in his and his nation's deeds. He also did value justice; according to Admiral Ruge's diary, Rommel told Ruge: "Justice is the indispensable foundation of a nation. Unfortunately, the higher-ups are not clean. The slaughterings are grave sins." The key to successfully creating an image, according to Rommel, was leading by example:

The men tend to feel no kind of contact with a commander who, they know, is sitting somewhere in headquarters. What they want is what might be termed a physical contact with him. In moments of panic, fatigue, or disorganization, or when something out of the ordinary has to be demanded from them, the personal example of the commander works wonders, especially if he has had the wit to create some sort of legend around himself.

He urged Axis authorities to treat Arabs with the utmost respect to prevent uprisings behind the front. He protested the use of propaganda at the cost of explicit military benefits though, criticising Hitler's headquarters for being unable to tell the German people and the world that El Alamein had been lost and preventing evacuation of the German forces in Northern Africa in the process. Ruge suggests that his chief treated his own fame as a kind of weapon.

In 1943, he surprised Hitler by proposing a Jew should be made into a Gauleiter to prove to the world that Germany was innocent of accusations that Rommel had heard from the enemy regarding the mistreatment of Jews. Hitler replied, "Dear Rommel, you understand nothing about my thinking at all."

== Relationship with Nazism ==
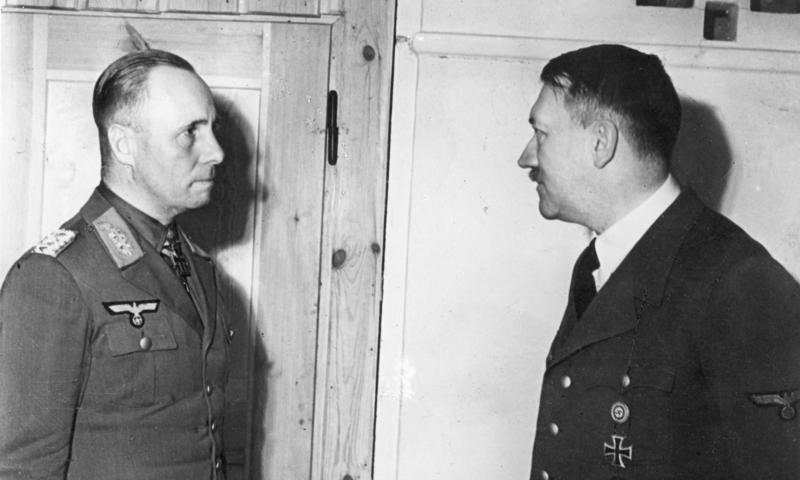
Rommel and Hitler in 1942

Rommel was not a Nazi Party member, but like many Wehrmacht officers welcomed the Nazi rise to power. He quickly developed a close, if complicated, relationship with Hitler. Rommel was one of Hitler's favourite generals and benefitted from the dictator’s patronage throughout his inter-war and wartime career. Historians such as Robert Citino describe him as “not apolitical”, noting that Rommel owed much of his rapid rise to Hitler’s favour, a view shared by Messenger. Kesselring characterised Rommel’s influence over Hitler as “hypnotic”. In 1944 Rommel told Ruge and his wife that Hitler possessed an irresistible “magnetic” aura. According to Remy, their relationship became personal in 1939 when Rommel proudly recounted that he had “sort of forced Hitler to go with me” to the Hradschin Castle in an open car, without bodyguards, under his protection—an episode Hitler “would never forget”.

The close relationship continued after the 1940 campaign. Hitler praised a diary Rommel prepared on the 7th Division, though Speer recalled that Hitler was irritated by Rommel’s vague battlefield reports. (Note: "He was bitterly annoyed with Rommel, who would often give extremely unclear bulletins on the day's movements. In other words, he "veiled" them from headquarters, sometimes for days, only to report an entirely changed situation. Hitler liked Rommel personally but could ill brook this sort of conduct.") Remy argues the relationship resembled a “dream marriage” until cracks appeared in 1942, eventually turning into what Ernst Jünger later called a “Haßliebe”. Rommel’s letters reveal fluctuating emotions: disgust at atrocities and mounting pessimism offset by enthusiasm whenever Hitler visited. Hitler displayed a similar ambivalence. He valued Rommel’s energy, spoke to him frequently about technical matters, and continued to seek his advice even as Rommel’s disobedience strained their relationship. Remy and Der Spiegel remark that Rommel’s later statement—“Once I have loved the Führer, and I still do”—was genuine, while Watson notes that Rommel believed he deserved death for his role in the conspiracy against Hitler.

Rommel accepted the propaganda campaigns built around him and benefitted from them. Naumann notes that the regime used him to create a myth, which Rommel tolerated due to ambition and vanity. Although he wished to remain “a man of the troops”, (Note: Maurice Remy: "... Rommel wollte bleiben, was es war: ein Mann der Truppe.") and disliked political manoeuvring, he showed interest in aspects of Nazi ideology, including the Volksgemeinschaft and the idea of a “common man” general elevated by merit. Butler describes his politics as centrist, with mild leanings to the left.

Historians disagree on when and how far Rommel broke with Hitler. Messenger argues that Rommel’s attitude changed only after recognising the war was lost following the Allied invasion of Normandy, while Remy believes Rommel never truly severed emotional ties but opposed Hitler when conscience demanded. Lieb notes that it is uncertain whether strategic defeat alone motivated Rommel’s desire to switch sides. Remy highlights a turning point in July 1943, when Hitler told Rommel that should Germany lose, the German people “could rot”; thereafter Rommel considered it fortunate that his Afrika Korps was safe as POWs. Die Welt later suggested that Hitler had favoured Rommel precisely because his non-Party status allowed him to appear “clean”.

Rommel’s political inclinations were controversial among Nazi elites. While he supported some elements of Nazi ideology and cooperated with propaganda, he objected when media falsely portrayed him as an early Party member or son of a mason. Goebbels nonetheless insisted Rommel was “ideologically sound”. As defeat loomed, Hitler and Goebbels attempted unsuccessfully to find another general who could match Rommel’s energy and influence. Even after learning of Rommel’s involvement in the plot against him, Hitler initially considered retiring him rather than executing him. Rommel’s refusal to publicly deny the accusations contributed to his forced suicide.

Several episodes have been cited as evidence of Rommel’s political naivety. After German forces murdered his wife’s uncle, Edmund Roszczynialski, in occupied Poland, Rommel—apparently failing to grasp the implications—wrote repeated letters to Himmler’s adjutants asking that he be looked after. In 1943 he suggested that a Jewish Gauleiter be appointed, which scholars interpret as a sign he misunderstood the nature of Nazi antisemitism. Lieb doubts that a commander of Rommel’s rank could have been unaware of Nazi atrocities, and Der Spiegel has described him as in denial about the crimes of the regime. Searle argues that early, largely bloodless Nazi successes allowed Rommel to sustain a favourable image of Hitler, while Scheck cautions that it may never be possible to determine how far he understood the regime’s criminal nature.

== Rommel myth ==
According to revisionist authors, an assessment of Rommel's role in history has been hampered by views formed for political reasons, creating what historians have called the "Rommel myth". The interpretation considered by some historians to be a myth is the depiction of the Field Marshal as an apolitical, brilliant commander and victim of Nazi Germany who participated in the 20 July plot against Hitler. There are authors who refer to "Rommel Myth" or "Rommel Legend" in a neutral or positive manner, though. The seeds of the myth can be found first in Rommel's drive for success as a young officer in World War I and in his popular 1937 book Infantry Attacks, which was written in a style that diverged from other military literature and became a best-seller.

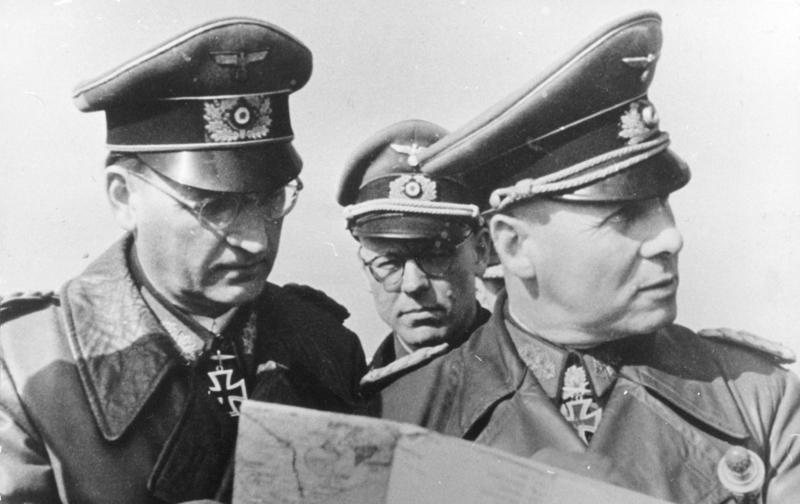
Rommel with Hans Speidel, who was involved in the 20 July plot

The myth then took shape during the opening years of World War II, as a component of Nazi propaganda to praise the Wehrmacht and instil optimism in the public, with Rommel's willing participation. When Rommel came to North Africa, it was picked up and disseminated in the West by the British press, as the Allies sought to explain their inability to defeat the Axis in North Africa. British military and political figures contributed to the heroic image of Rommel, when he resumed offensive operations in January 1942 against British forces weakened by redeployments to the Far East. During parliamentary debate following the fall of Tobruk, Churchill described Rommel as an "extraordinary bold and clever opponent" and "great field commander".

According to Der Spiegel following the war's end, West Germany yearned for father figures to replace the former ones who had been unmasked as criminals. Rommel was chosen because he embodied the decent soldier, cunning yet fair-minded, and if guilty by association, not so guilty he became unreliable, and comrades reported that he was close to the Resistance. While everyone else was disgraced, his star became brighter than ever, and he made the unprecedented leap over the threshold between eras: from Hitler's favourite general to the young republic's hero. Cornelia Hecht notes that despite the change of times, Rommel has become the symbol of different regimes and concepts, which is paradoxical, whoever the man he really was.

The Western Allies, and particularly the British, depicted Rommel as the "good German". His reputation for conducting a clean war was used in the interest of the West German rearmament and reconciliation between former enemies—Britain and the US on one side and the new Federal Republic of Germany on the other. When Rommel's alleged involvement in the plot to kill Hitler became known after the war, his stature was enhanced in the eyes of former adversaries. Rommel was often cited in Western sources as a patriotic German willing to stand up to Hitler. Churchill wrote about him in 1950: "[Rommel] (...) deserves our respect because, although a loyal German soldier, he came to hate Hitler and all his works and took part in the conspiracy of 1944 to rescue Germany by displacing the maniac and tyrant."

== Family life ==
While at Cadet School in 1911, Rommel became engaged to 17-year-old Lucia (Lucie) Maria Mollin (1894–1971). While stationed in Weingarten in 1913, Rommel developed a relationship with Walburga Stemmer, which produced a daughter, Gertrud, in December 1913. Because of elitism in the officer corps, Stemmer's working-class background made her unsuitable as an officer's wife, and Rommel felt honour-bound to uphold his commitment to Mollin. With Mollin's cooperation, he accepted financial responsibility for the child. Rommel and Mollin were married in 1916 in Danzig. Rommel's marriage was happy, and he wrote his wife at least one letter every day while he was in the field.

After the First World War, the couple settled in Stuttgart, and Stemmer and her child lived with them. Gertrud was referred to as Rommel's niece, a fiction that went unquestioned because of the many women widowed during the war. Walburga died suddenly in 1928, committing suicide as Lucia was pregnant. Gertrud remained a member of the household until Rommel's death in 1944. The incident with Walburga affected Rommel for the rest of his life: he would keep women distant. A son, Manfred Rommel, was born on 24 December 1928, and served as Mayor of Stuttgart from 1974 to 1996.

== Awards ==
- Military Merit Order (Württemberg)
- Friedrich Order Knight 1st Class (Württemberg)
- Military Merit Cross, 3rd class with war decoration and swords (Austria-Hungary)
- Military Merit Order (Bavaria) 4th Class with Swords
- Iron Cross 2nd Class on 24 September 1914 and 1st Class on 29 January 1915
- Pour le Mérite on 18 December 1917
- Wound Badge 1918 in Silver
- Clasp to the Iron Cross 2nd Class on 13 May 1940 and 1st Class on 15 May 1940
- Panzer Badge In Silver
- Knight's Cross of the Iron Cross with Oak Leaves, Swords and Diamonds
  - Knight's Cross of the Iron Cross on 27 May 1940 as commander of the 7th Panzer-Division
  - Oak Leaves (10th recipient) on 20 March 1941 as commander of the 7th Panzer-Division
  - Swords (sixth recipient) on 20 January 1942 as commander of the Panzer Group Afrika
  - Diamonds (sixth recipient) on 11 March 1943 as commander in chief of the Army Group Afrika
- Grand Officer of the Military Order of Savoy on 11 May 1941
  - Knight Grand Cross in the summer of 1942
- Italian Silver Medal of Military Valour in February 1942
- Knight of the Colonial Order of the Star of Italy in February 1942

== Commemoration ==
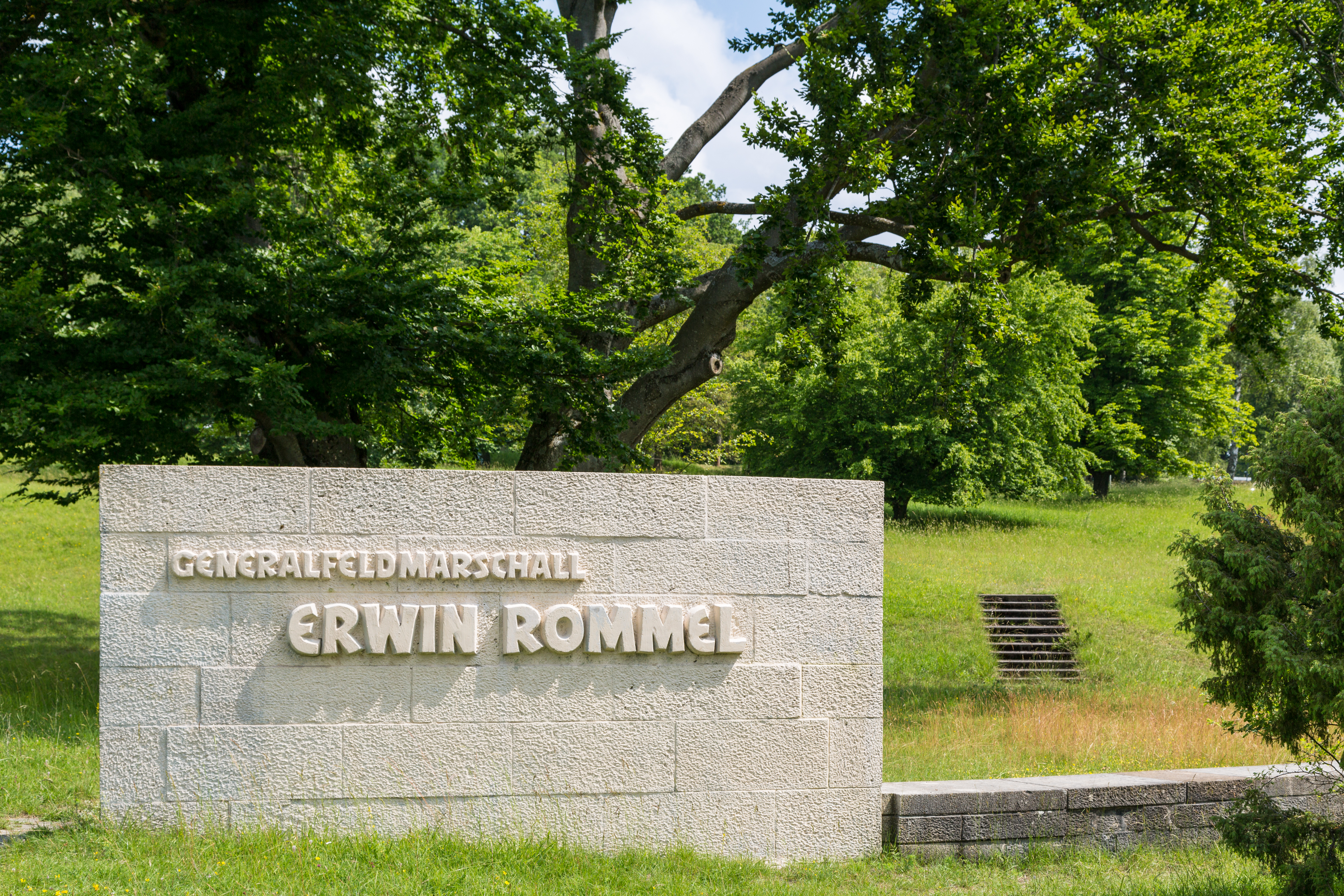
Memorial to Erwin Rommel in Heidenheim, Germany

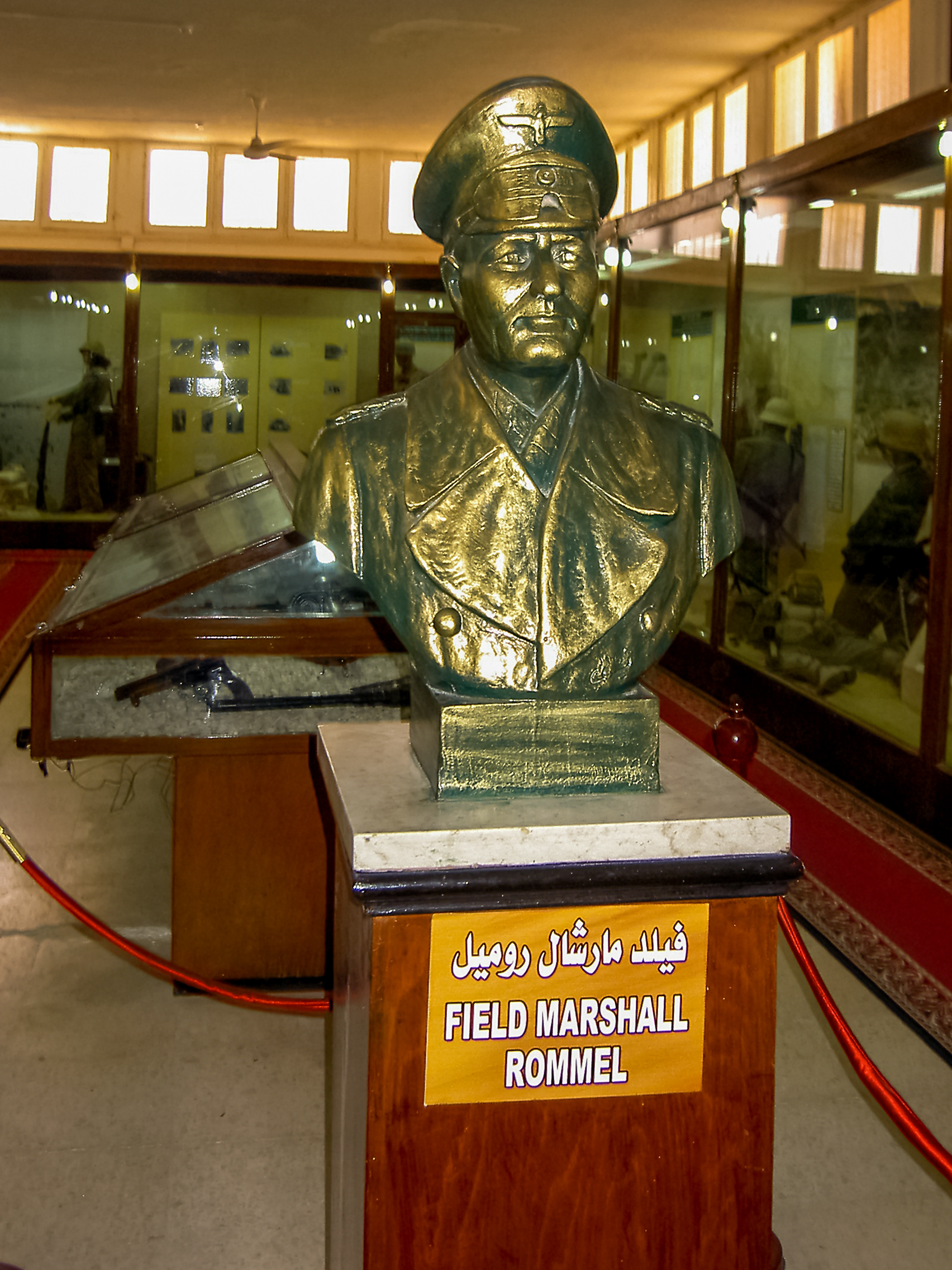
Bust of Rommel at Al Alamein war museum in Egypt, which was built by Anwar Sadat in honour of Rommel. The museum was expanded into a general war museum but Rommel remains a central figure.

The German Army's largest base, the Field Marshal Rommel Barracks, Augustdorf, is named in his honour; at the dedication in 1961, his widow Lucie and son Manfred were guests of honour. The Rommel Barracks, Dornstadt, was named for him in 1965. A third base, the Field Marshal Rommel Barracks, Osterode, closed in 2004. The German destroyer Rommel was named for him in 1969, christened by his widow, and decommissioned in 1998.

The Rommel Memorial was erected in Heidenheim in 1961. In 2020, a sculpture of a landmine victim was placed next to it. The mayor Bernhard Ilg commented that, regarding "the great son of Heidenheim", "there are many opinions". Heidenheim eventually dedicated the Memorial towards a stand against war, militarism and extremism, stating that when the memorial was erected, statements were added that now are incompatible with modern knowledge about Rommel. Rommel's troops laid down landmines, and since statistics started in the 1980s, it is claimed 3,300 people have lost their lives, and 7,500 have been maimed due to these. It is disputed whether the landmines in El Alamein, the most notable portion of landmines left over, were left by the Afrika Korps or the British.

In Aalen, after a discussion on renaming a street named after him, a new place of commemoration was created, where stelae with information on Rommel and opponents of the regime stand together. The History Association of Aalen, together with a commission of historians from Düsseldorf, welcomes the keeping of the street's name and notes that Rommel was neither a war criminal nor resistance fighter, but a perpetrator and victim – he willingly served as figurehead for the regime, then recognised his mistake and paid with his life. An education program named "Erwin Rommel and Aalen" for schoolchildren in Aalen is aestablished.

In 2021, the Student Council of the University of Erlangen–Nuremberg changed the name of their Süd-Campus into Rommel-Campus, emphasising that the city of Erlangen stands behind the name and the university needs to do the same. The university's branch of the Education and Science Workers' Union describes the decision as problematic considering Rommel's history of supporting the Nazi regime.

Numerous streets in Germany, especially in Rommel's home state of Baden-Württemberg, are named in his honour, including the street near his last home. The Rommel Museum opened in 1989 in the Villa Lindenhof in Herrlingen. It now operates under the name Museum Lebenslinien (Lifelines Museum), which presents the lives of Rommel and other notable residents of Herrlingen. There is a Rommel Museum in Mersa Matruh in Egypt which opened in 1977, and is located in one of Rommel's former headquarters; various other localities and establishments in Mersa Matruh, including Rommel Beach, are also named for Rommel. The reason for the naming is that he respected the Bedouins' traditions and sanctity of their homes (he kept his troops at least 2 kilometres from their houses) and refused to poison the wells against the Allies, fearing it would harm the population.

In Italy, the annual marathon tour "Rommel Trail", celebrates Rommel and the Battle of Caporetto.

== Portrayals ==
- Erich von Stroheim (1943) (Five Graves to Cairo)
- James Mason (1951) (The Desert Fox: The Story of Rommel)
- James Mason (1953) (The Desert Rats)
- Paul Klinger (1959) (Rommel Calls Cairo)
- Werner Hinz (1962) (The Longest Day)
- Christopher Plummer (1967) (The Night of the Generals)
- Robert Hossein (1969) (The Battle of El Alamein)
- Karl Michael Vogler (1970) (Patton)
- Wolfgang Preiss (1971) (Raid on Rommel)
- Hardy Krüger (1988) (War and Remembrance)
- Ulrich Tukur (2012) (Rommel)
- Robert Pike Daniel (2014) (P-51 Dragon Fighter)

== Notes ==
Military offices
Preceded by Rudolf Towarek	Commandant of the Theresian Military Academy NCO WarSchool; 1938	Succeeded by ?
New creation	Commander of the Führerbegleitbrigade; 1938 – 5 February 1940	Succeeded by Colonel Kurt Thomas
Preceded by General der Kavallerie Georg Stumme	Commander of 7th Panzer Division; 5 February 1940 – 15 February 1941	Succeeded by General der Panzertruppe Hans von Funck
New creation	Commander of the Afrika Korps; 19 February – 15 August 1941	Succeeded by Generalleutnant Ludwig Crüwell
New creation	Commander of Heeresgruppe Afrika; 15 August 1941 – 9 March 1943	Succeeded by General Hans-Jürgen von Arnim
Preceded by Maximilian von Weichs	Commander of Heeresgruppe B (Army Group B); 15 July 1943 – 19 July 1944	Succeeded by Generalfeldmarschall Günther von Kluge
Awards and achievements
Preceded by The American Flag	Cover of Time magazine 13 July 1942	Succeeded by Dmitri Shostakovich
