= Owen Connelly =

- Born: 29 January 1924; Morganton, North Carolina
- Died: July 12, 2011 (aged 87); Hopkins, South Carolina

Academic work
- Main interests: Military history, especially the Napoleonic Wars.

Owen Sergeson "Mike" Connelly Jr. (29 January 1924 – 12 July 2011), who published as Owen Connelly, was an American historian who specialized in military history, especially the Napoleonic Wars. He was Distinguished Professor of History Emeritus at the University of South Carolina.

Connelly was the author of ten books, including:

- Napoleon's Satellite Kingdoms (1965)
- The Gentle Bonaparte: A Biography of Joseph, Napoleon's Elder Brother (1968)
- The Epoch of Napoleon (1972)
- Consortium on Revolutionary Europe (1979)
- Historical Dictionary of Napoleonic France, 1799–1815 (1985; editor)
- The French Revolution and Napoleonic Era (1999)
- On War and Leadership: The Words of Combat Commanders from Frederick the Great to Norman Schwarzkopf (2002)
- Blundering to Glory: Napoleon's Military Campaigns (2006)
- The Wars of the French Revolution and Napoleon, 1792–1815 (2006)
- The American Military Tradition: From Colonial Times to the Present (2006; contributor)
