= Walburga Stemmer =

Erwin Rommel's mistress

Walburga Stemmer (March 1892 – October 1928) was a woman who had an affair with German field marshal Erwin Rommel and gave birth to his daughter, Gertrud Stemmer (later Mrs. Gertrud Pan), on 8 December 1913. Rommel's family put pressure on him to leave Stemmer and return to his fiancée Lucie Mollin, who he soon married.

Stemmer died in 1928, when Rommel's wife Lucie was pregnant with the couple's son Manfred. Her cause of death was given as pneumonia, though it is generally accepted that she probably committed suicide.

== Life ==
Stemmer was the daughter of a seamstress. She was twenty years old and working as a fruit-seller in Weingarten (Württemberg) when she met Rommel, who was assigned to the area to train army recruits. He was separated from his fiancée Lucie, who was studying in Danzig.

In December 8, 1913, a year after he met Walburga, their daughter Gertrud was born, to Rommel's delight. He wrote to Walburga, calling her his "little mouse". He said he would like to set up home with her and Gertrud: "It's got to be perfect, this little nest of ours." However this did not happen. Rommel broke off the relationship. Walburga is said to have never recovered. Rommel's mother seems to have put pressure on him to end the relationship because she believed Walburga was not suitable to be the wife of an officer.

Despite the separation, Rommel had no intention of abandoning Walburga and Gertrud. He told Lucie the truth about the relationship, provided financial support and kept in regular contact. When World War I began only a few months after Gertrud's birth, Rommel arranged that in the event he was killed his life insurance would support Gertrud.

In 1916, Rommel married Lucie. Walburga continued to hope that he would return to them. She hoped that as long as the couple remained childless Rommel's devotion to Gertrud would bring him back to her. According to Gertrud's son Josef Pan, "Rommel was Walburga's only love. As long as Rommel and Lucie never had children she held on to the conviction that he would return to her. When Manfred was born in 1928 she took an overdose... The explanation given in public was that she had died of pneumonia. Later the family doctor told my mother she had taken her own life."

Gertrud was born in Ravensburger Landkreis, Baden-Württemberg, Germany on December 8, 1913. Gertrud married Joseph Pan and had four children. She died in 2000 in Baden-Württemberg, Germany.

== Gertrud and Rommel ==
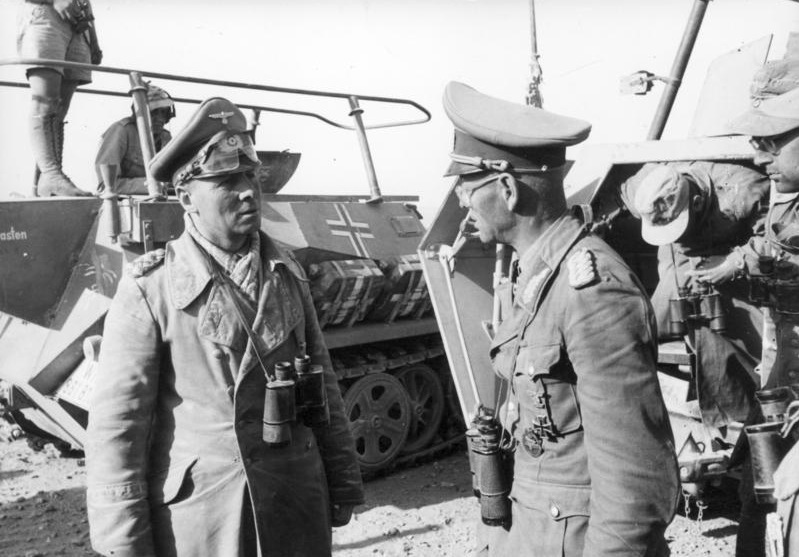
Rommel (left) shown wearing the plaid scarf made for him by his daughter, Gertrud

After her mother's death, Rommel and Lucie looked after the fifteen-year-old Gertrud. Gertrud exchanged hundreds of letters with her father. She knitted him a plaid scarf, which is seen in many images of Rommel in the desert. Lucie knew that Gertrud was Rommel's daughter and the family helped support her. Manfred Rommel noted she was always referred to as "cousin Gertrud".

Gertrud was a frequent visitor to the family and was at Rommel's hospital bedside after he returned ill from Africa. There, she answered the telephone call from a furious Hitler who ordered him back to Africa. She stayed close to the family even after Rommel's forced suicide, and his letters to and from Walburga and Gertrud were inherited by her son Joseph, who made the story public in 2000 after Gertrud's death.
