= Rommel Museum, Blaustein =

Rommel Museum
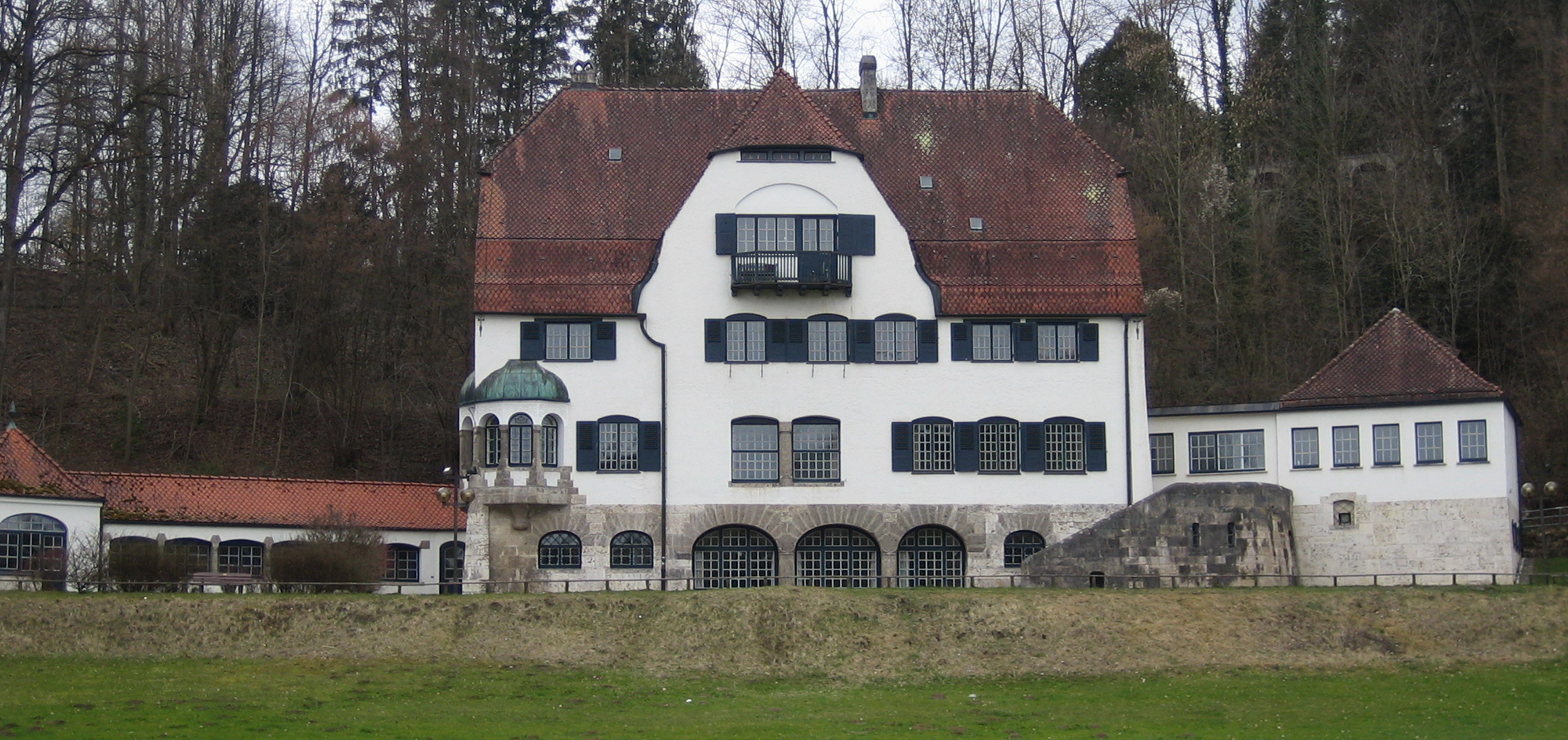
- Rommel Museum
- Established: 1989
- Location: Herrlingen, Blaustein
- Coordinates: 48°25′10″N 9°53′45″E
- Type: Museum

The Rommel Museum was located in Blaustein in the state of Baden-Württemberg in Germany. The museum was dedicated to the memory of Field Marshal Erwin Rommel, popularly known as the "Desert Fox". The museum opened in 1989 and was located in the Villa Lindenhof in the borough of Herrlingen, and closed in May 2019. Among the exhibits were documents, maps and pictures from Rommel's North African Campaign; the museum also exhibited sand collected by German soldiers in North Africa during the campaign. The museum also included the Rommel Archives.
