= Rommel Museum, Mersa Matruh =

Museum in Mersa Matruh, Egypt

Coordinates: 31.3656°N 27.2484°E

The Rommel Museum is a museum dedicated to the memory of German field marshal Erwin Rommel in Mersa Matruh in Egypt.

It opened in 1977 on the initiative of the Egyptian government and with support of the West German government, to establish a museum in Rommel's honour. It is located in the caves Rommel used as his headquarters during part of the El Alamein campaign, and has since become a tourist attraction. Rommel's son Manfred Rommel, then the Lord Mayor of Stuttgart, was guest of honour at the opening and donated several of Rommel's belongings to the museum. The museum reopened in 2017 after several years of restoration work on the caves.

An island, a beach and a bridge near the museum are also named for Rommel. There is also a Rommel Café and a Rommel Hotel.
