= The Rommel Papers =

1953 collection edited by B.H. Liddell Hart

- The book cover of the 1953 edition, edited by B. H. Liddell Hart. It was one of the foundational texts that built the Rommel legend as one of the components of the overarching myth of the clean Wehrmacht
- Editor: Basil Liddell-Hart
- Author: Erwin Rommel
- Language: English
- Genre: Memoirs
- Publication date: 1953
- Publication place: United Kingdom and others
- Media type: Print
- ISBN: 978-0-306-80157-0

The Rommel Papers is the collected writings by the German World War II field marshal Erwin Rommel published in 1953. The papers were collected by documentary editor B. H. Liddell Hart.

== Background and publication ==
The book included Rommel's writings of the war, edited by the British journalist and historian B. H. Liddell Hart, the former Wehrmacht officer Fritz Bayerlein, who served on Rommel's staff in North Africa, and Rommel's widow and son. The volume contained an introduction and commentary by Liddell Hart.

Liddell Hart had a personal interest in the work: by having coaxed Rommel's widow to include material favourable to himself, he could present Rommel as his "pupil" when it came to mobile armoured warfare. Thus, Liddell Hart's "theory of indirect approach" became a precursor to the German blitzkrieg ("lightning war"). The controversy was described by the political scientist John Mearsheimer in his work The Weight of History, who concluded that, by "putting words in the mouths of German Generals and manipulating history", Liddell Hart was in a position to show that he had been at the root of the dramatic German successes in 1940.

== Reception ==
The historian Mark Connelly argues that The Rommel Papers was one of the two foundational works that lead to a "Rommel renaissance" and "Anglophone rehabilitation", the other being Desmond Young's biography, Rommel: The Desert Fox. The book contributed to the perception of Rommel as a brilliant commander; in an introduction, Liddell Hart drew comparisons between Rommel and Lawrence of Arabia, "two masters of desert warfare."

== Editions ==
- Rommel, Erwin (1982) [1953]. Liddell Hart, B. H. (ed.). The Rommel Papers. New York: Da Capo Press. ISBN 978-0-306-80157-0.

=== Bibliography ===
- Connelly, Mark (2014). "Rommel as icon". In I. F. W. Beckett (ed.). Rommel Reconsidered. Mechanicsburg, PA: Stackpole Books. ISBN 978-0-8117-1462-4.
- Luvaas, Jay (1990). "Liddell Hart and the Mearsheimer Critique: A 'Pupil's' Retrospective" (PDF). Strategic Studies Institute. Archived from the original (PDF) on May 22, 2013.
- Major, Patrick (2008). "'Our Friend Rommel': The Wehrmacht as 'Worthy Enemy' in Postwar British Popular Culture". German History. 26 (4). Oxford University Press: 520–535. doi:10.1093/gerhis/ghn049.
- Mearsheimer, John (1988). Liddell Hart and the Weight of History. Ithaca, N.Y.: Cornell University Press. ISBN 978-0-8014-2089-4.
