= Rommel myth =

Aspect of WWII history

The Rommel myth, or the Rommel legend, is a phrase used by a number of historians for the common depictions of German Generalfeldmarschall Erwin Rommel as an apolitical, brilliant commander and a victim of Nazi Germany due to his presumed participation in the 20 July plot against Adolf Hitler, which led to Rommel's forced suicide in 1944. According to these historians, who take a critical view of Rommel, such depictions are not accurate.

The description of Rommel as a brilliant commander started in 1941, with Rommel's participation, as a component of Nazi propaganda to praise the Wehrmacht and instill optimism in the German public. It was picked up and disseminated in the West by the British war-time press as the Allies sought to explain their continued inability to defeat the Axis forces in North Africa: the genius of Rommel was used by dissenters to protest against social inequality within the British Army and by leaders like Churchill to reduce class tensions. (Note: Terry Brighton: "It was suggested that the problem was not an inadequate army but the predominance of upper-class officers in senior posts, and that "If Rommel had been in the British Army he would still have been a sergeant." Churchill, fighting for his survival, deflected attention from the failings of British generals by stressing the extraordinary qualities of their opponent: "We have a very daring and skilful opponent against us, and, may I say across the havoc of war, a great general."")

Following the war, the Western Allies, and particularly the British, depicted Rommel as the "good German" and "our friend Rommel", adhering closely to the tenets of the myth of the clean Wehrmacht. His reputation for conducting a clean war was used in the interests of West German rearmament during the Cold War and the reconciliation between the former enemies—the United Kingdom and the United States on one side, and the new Federal Republic of Germany on the other. The 1950 biography Rommel: The Desert Fox and the 1953 publication of The Rommel Papers added to the myth, which has proven resilient to critical examination.

This reevaluation has produced new interpretations of Rommel, including his relationship with Nazism, his abilities as an operational and strategic level commander, and his role in the 20 July plot to assassinate Hitler. Historians and commentators conclude that Rommel remains an ambiguous figure, not easily definable either inside or outside the myth.

== Terminology ==
Early authors such as Desmond Young and Basil Liddell Hart mention "the Rommel legend" in their respective books. Liddell Hart described British efforts to make counterpropaganda against Rommel's military reputation (while showing respect to his conduct of war): "Thus the British commanders and headquarter staffs were compelled to make strenuous efforts to dispel 'the Rommel legend'". As early as 1950, the 1st Viscount Montgomery of Alamein's former deputy referred to the "myth" in an article titled "The Rommel Myth Debunked" where he aimed to address perceived misconceptions regarding the fighting in the North African Campaign.

As used by German authors, Mythos Rommel (roughly translated into English as "Rommel myth") is a neutral description, as can be seen in works by historians such as Peter Lieb. The term recognizes, per Lieb, that "Rommel is and remains a Mythos ... He could not be stuck in a single drawer. At any rate, one should decide for oneself whether one sees him as a role model or not". German authors who use the word "Mythos" in this neutral manner include Maurice Philip Remy, Wolfram Pyta, Jörg Echternkamp, Guido Knopp, and Sandra Mass.

== Origins ==
The origins of the myth can be found first in Generalfeldmarschall Rommel's drive for success as a young officer in World War I, and then in his popular 1937 book Infanterie Greift An (Infantry Attacks), which was written in a style that diverged from the German military literature of the time. The book became a bestseller and was supposedly read by Adolf Hitler.

Historian Antony Beevor places the start of the "Rommel legend" on 13 May 1940, during the Battle of France, when Rommel's troops crossed the Meuse under fire and established bridgeheads at Houx and Dinant.

According to Hans-Ulrich Wehler, the original reason that led to Rommel's high reputation in foreign countries was that people in Allied countries heard that he treated the captured soldiers well.

=== In Nazi and Allied propaganda ===
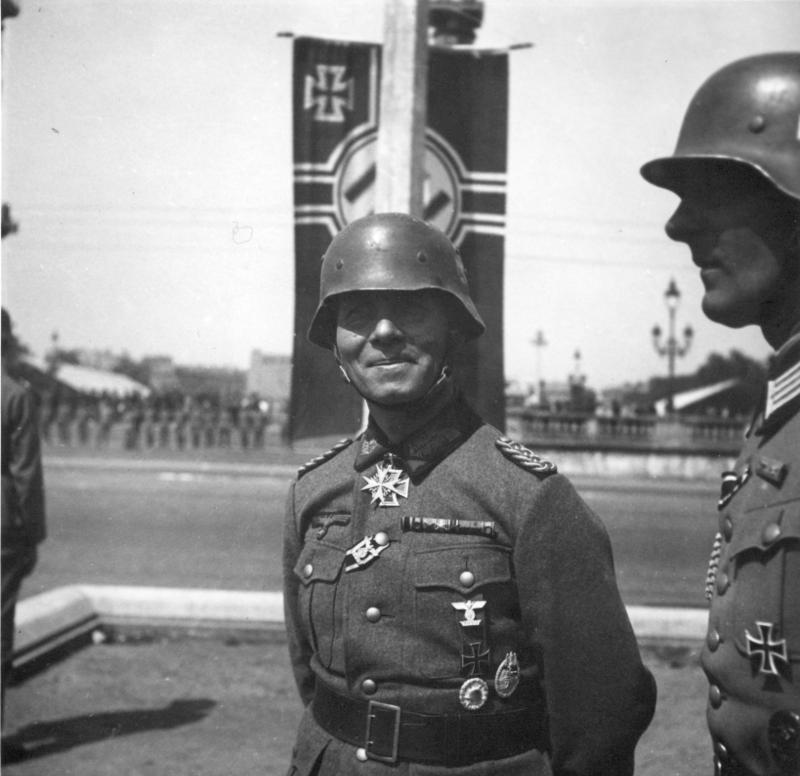
Rommel at the Paris victory parade, June 1940. Rommel had access to Reich Propaganda Minister Joseph Goebbels via Karl Hanke, who served under Rommel in 1940.

At the beginning, although Hitler and Goebbels took particular notice of Rommel, the Nazi elites had no intent to create one major war symbol (partly out of fear that he would offset Hitler), generating huge propaganda campaigns for not only Rommel but also Gerd von Rundstedt, Walther von Brauchitsch, Eduard Dietl, Sepp Dietrich (the latter two were party members and also strongly supported by Hitler), etc. Nevertheless, a multitude of factors—including Rommel's unusual charisma, (Note: Remy:"On 8 August 1914, ... Rommel discovered that he had unusual charisma ... This effect (he had on the troops) would become the fundamental element of Mythos Rommel.",) (Note: Der Spiegel: "The Wehrmacht had many capable generals ... but none had the charisma of the Swabian with that distinctive round head.") his talents both in military matters and public relations, (Note: Majdalany: Rommel was, among other things, clever at public relations.), the efforts of Goebbels's propaganda machine, and the Allies' participation in mythologising his life (either for political benefits, sympathy for someone who evoked a romantic archetype, or genuine admiration for his actions)—gradually contributed to Rommel's fame. Spiegel wrote, "Even back then his fame outshone that of all other commanders."

Rommel's victories in France were featured in the German press and in the February 1941 film Sieg im Westen (Victory in the West), in which Rommel personally helped direct a segment re-enacting the crossing of the Somme River.According to Scheck, although there is no evidence of Rommel committing crimes, during the shooting of the movie, African prisoners of war, were forced to take part in its making, and forced to carry out humiliating acts. Stills from the re-enactment are found in "Rommel Collection"; it was filmed by Hans Ertl, assigned to this task by Dr. Kurt Hesse, a personal friend of Rommel, who worked for Wehrmacht Propaganda Section V Rommel's victories in 1941 were played up by the Nazi propaganda, even though his successes in North Africa were achieved in arguably one of Germany's least strategically important theatres of World War II. (Note: Niall Barr: "... came to fame in a theatre which held almost no strategic interest for Hitler whatsoever."(Barr 2014, p. 60). Martin Kitchen: "German historians have largely ignored the North African campaign, not only because it was peripheral ..."(Kitchen 2009, p. 9).) In November 1941, Reich Minister of Propaganda Joseph Goebbels wrote about "the urgent need" to have Rommel "elevated to a kind of popular hero." Rommel, with his innate abilities as a military commander and love of the spotlight, was a perfect fit for the role Goebbels designed for him.

==== Successes in North Africa ====
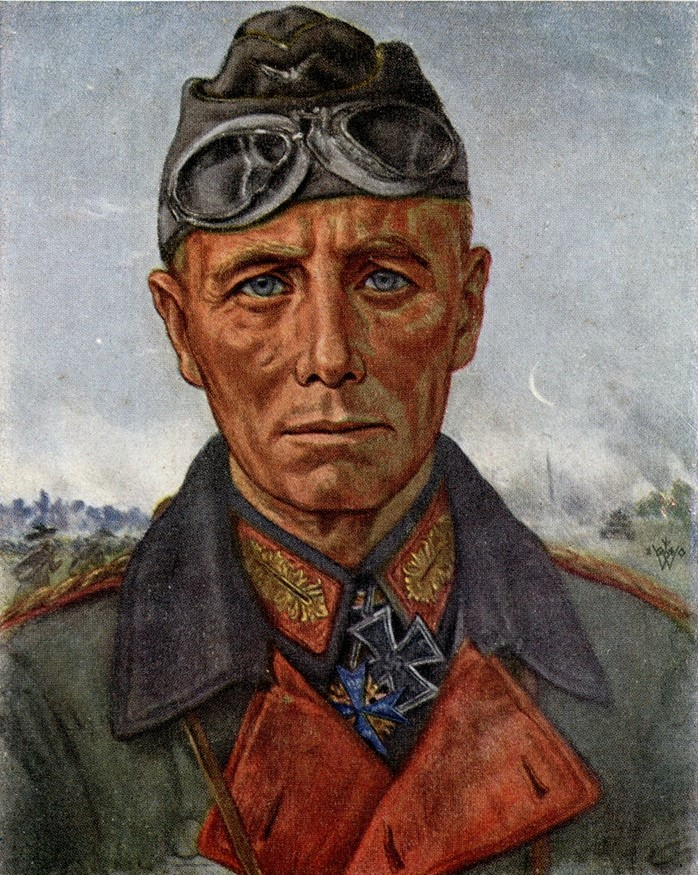
Portrait of Erwin Rommel, by Wolfgang Willrich (1941)

In North Africa Rommel received help in cultivating his image from Alfred Ingemar Berndt, a senior official at the Reich Propaganda Ministry, who had volunteered for military service. Seconded by Goebbels, Berndt was assigned to Rommel's staff and became one of his closest aides. Berndt often acted as liaison between Rommel, the Propaganda Ministry and the Führer Headquarters. He directed Rommel's photo shoots and filed radio dispatches describing the battles.

In the spring of 1941 Rommel's name began to appear in the British media. In the autumn of 1941 and early winter of 1941/1942 he was mentioned in the British press almost daily. The Daily Express and The Cairns Post wrote: "No 'von' nonsense about Erich, nor the code of conduct—such as it was—that most Prussian officers have honoured in war. He is a gangster general, trained in a harder school than Chicago. He was Hitler's thug organiser before he came to power ... So Erich became leader of the S.S. Black Guard, Hitler's private army, which executes his private revenges and guards his person ... When at last Poland made a stand for democracy, it was Rommel who led a panzer corps against the Polish horse cavalry with conspicuous gallantry. Later in France Hitler made him a Knight of the Iron Cross for breaking through the Maginot Line at Maubeuge with the 7th Armoured Division. True, French resistance was almost at an end then, but Erich was entitled to his decoration, too." Toward the end of the year, the Reich propaganda machine also used Rommel's successes in Africa as a diversion from the Wehrmacht's challenging situation in the Soviet Union with the stall of Operation Barbarossa. (Note: Peter Caddick-Adams: "Rommel's advances over the winter 1941–42 became a very useful distraction away from Germany's failure before Moscow.")

The American press soon began to take notice of Rommel as well, following the United States' entry into the war on 11 December 1941, writing that: "The British ... admire him because he beat them and were surprised to have beaten in turn such a capable general". General Claude Auchinleck distributed a directive to his commanders seeking to dispel the notion that Rommel was a "superman". The Battle of Kasserine Pass during the Tunisian Campaign intensified the GIs' admiration towards Rommel. The cult of personality was so strong that, according to Peter Schrijvers, "for the remainder of the war, German POWs would part with pictures of Rommel as reluctantly as GIs were eager to get them". While Allied troops respected Rommel, civilians held the "widely accepted" negative image of Rommel's origin and his connection with the Nazis. As described by Rosie Goldschmidt Waldeck (who debunked the invented story) and The New York Times in 1943, "It has been said that Rommel started his career as a Hitler hoodlum and owes his quick rise to his early collaboration with Himmler." This line of propaganda perpetuated until the war ended. According to Atkinson, to counter the "perverse chivalry" ("war without hate", in Rommel's words) that Rommel promoted, the British and American authorities instituted hate training and tried to raise the eagerness to kill the enemies by stressing enemy brutality, as well as spattering slaughterhouse blood in assault training courses. General John Strawson notes the same difference in attitudes to war between the leaderships of the two sides.

The attention of the Western and especially the British press thrilled Goebbels, who wrote in his diary in early 1942: "Rommel continues to be the recognized darling of even the enemies' news agencies." The Field Marshal was pleased by the media attention, although he knew the downsides of having a reputation. (Note: Quote from one of Rommel's letters, January 1942: "The opinion of me in the world press has improved.") Hitler took note of the British propaganda as well, commenting in the summer of 1942 that Britain's leaders must have hoped "to be able to explain their defeat to their own nation more easily by focusing on Rommel".

The Field Marshal was the German commander most frequently covered in the German media and the only one to be given a press conference, which took place in October 1942. The press conference was moderated by Goebbels and was attended by both domestic and foreign media. Rommel declared: "Today we (...) have the gates of Egypt in hand, and with the intent to act!" Keeping the focus on Rommel distracted the German public from Wehrmacht losses elsewhere as the tide of the war began to turn. He became a symbol that was used to reinforce the German public's faith in an ultimate Axis victory.

==== Military reverses ====
In the wake of the British victory at the Second Battle of El Alamein in November 1942, and other military reverses, the Propaganda Ministry directed the media to emphasise Rommel's invincibility. The charade was maintained until the spring of 1943, even as the German situation in Africa became increasingly precarious. In May 1943, to ensure that the inevitable defeat in Africa would not be associated with Rommel's name, Goebbels had the Supreme High Command announce that Rommel was on a two-month leave for health reasons. (Note: Peter Lieb: "Hitler was well aware that it would be unwise ... to link the downfall of Army Group Africa to the name of Rommel, the child of Joseph Goebbel's propaganda machinery.") Instead, the campaign was presented by Berndt, who resumed his role in the Propaganda Ministry, as a ruse to tie down the British Empire while Germany was turning Europe into an impenetrable fortress, with Rommel at the helm of this success. After the radio program ran in May 1943, Rommel sent Berndt a case of cigars as a sign of his gratitude.

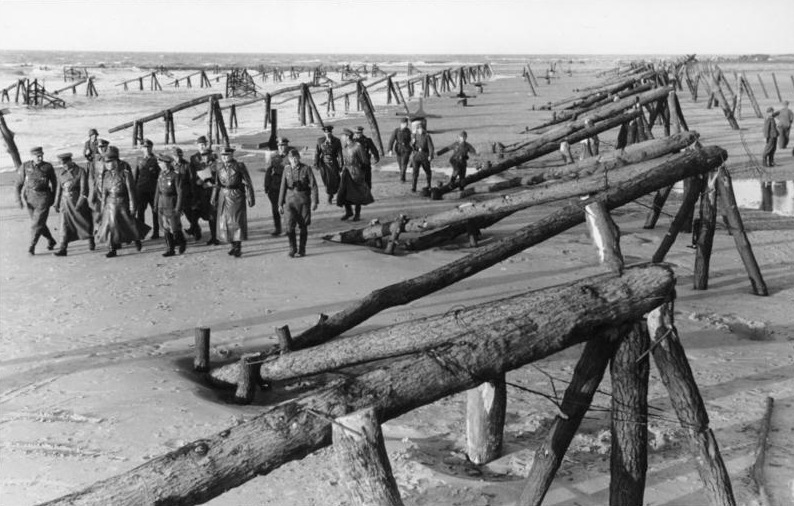
One of the many Nazi propaganda photographs of Rommel's inspection tours along the Atlantic Wall.

Although Rommel then entered a period without a significant command, he remained a household name in Germany, synonymous with the aura of invincibility. Hitler then made Rommel part of his defensive strategy for "Fortress Europe" (Festung Europa) by sending him to the West to inspect fortifications along the Atlantic Wall. Goebbels supported the decision, noting in his diary that Rommel was "undoubtedly the suitable man" for the task. The propaganda minister expected the move to reassure the German public, and at the same time to have a negative impact on the Allied forces' morale.

In France, a Wehrmacht propaganda company frequently accompanied Rommel on his inspection trips to document his work for both domestic and foreign audiences. In May 1944, the German newsreels reported on Rommel's speech at a Wehrmacht conference, where he stated his conviction that "every single German soldier will make his contribution against the Anglo-American spirit that it deserves for its criminal and bestial air war campaign against our homeland." The speech led to an upswing in morale and sustained confidence in Rommel.

When Rommel was seriously wounded on 17 July 1944, the Propaganda Ministry undertook efforts to conceal the injury so as not to undermine domestic morale. Despite this, the news leaked to the British press. To counteract the rumours of a serious injury and even death, Rommel was required to appear at a press conference held on 1 August. On 3 August, the German press published an official report that Rommel had been injured in a car accident. Rommel noted in his diary his dismay at this twisting of the truth, belatedly realising how much the Reich propaganda was using him for its own ends.

==== Post-war ====
Quoting Correlli Barnett ("The Desert War entered the British folk-memory, a source of legend, endlessly re-written as both history and fiction"), the historian Lucio Ceva argues that even though the myth was of British origin, it found its reflections in post-war West Germany. The historian Peter Caddick-Adams suggests that, following his forced suicide, Rommel emerged as the "acceptable face of German militarism, the 'good' German who stood apart from the Nazi regime." The ground was thus fertile for the myth to be reborn after the war, in the interest of the program of the German rearmament and the Allied–West German reconciliation.

After the outbreak of the Korean War in 1950, it became clear to the Americans and the British that a German army would have to be revived to help face off against the Soviet Union. Many former German officers, including Adolf Heusinger and Hans Speidel, who had served on Rommel's staff in France, were convinced that no future West German Army would be possible without the rehabilitation of the Wehrmacht. In October 1950, at the behest of West German chancellor Konrad Adenauer, a group of former senior officers produced the document that later became known as the Himmerod memorandum. Intended as both a planning and a negotiating tool, the document included a key demand for "measures to transform domestic and foreign public opinion" with regards to the German military.

== Foundational works ==
Rommel's former enemies, especially the British, played a key role in the manufacture and propagation of the myth. The German rearmament was highly dependent on the moral rehabilitation that the Wehrmacht needed. The journalist and historian Basil Liddell Hart, an early proponent of these two interconnected initiatives, provided the first widely available source on Rommel in his 1948 book on Hitler's generals, updated in 1951. Portraying Rommel as an outsider to the Nazi regime in the 1948 edition, Liddell Hart concluded the 1951 text with comments on Rommel's "gifts and performance" that "qualified him for a place in the role of the 'Great Captains' of history".

=== Five Graves to Cairo (film) ===
The 1943 movie Five Graves to Cairo, directed by Billy Wilder, was the only wartime movie that featured a German general as a major character. According to Battistelli, Erich von Stroheim's portrayal of Rommel might "have been far from reality, but it certainly contributed to give rise to Rommel's myth". In June 1943, the magazine Life comments: "It will not win any Academy awards but is an important film for it re-introduces Erich von Stroheim as the screen's arch-villain in a Prussian uniform, this time portraying the Nazi's much-touted Field Marshal Rommel... Forgetting his early caricatures of pompous Prussians, he plays Field Marshal Rommel with much finesse, shows him to be human as well as cunning, brutal and vain." The film "exploits one of the standard wartime German stereotypes, that of the cold, ruthless aristocratic Junker officer", portraying Rommel as a "Wilhelmine officer complete with duelling scars and unbending authority." Film historian Bernard F. Dick remarks that Stroheim's Rommel already had sympathetic traits, too, considering Rommel himself was a person screenwriters found hard to vilify or caricaturize.

=== Rommel: The Desert Fox ===
The other foundational text was the influential and laudatory 1950 biography Rommel: The Desert Fox by Brigadier Desmond Young. (Note: Martin Kitchen: "Early biographies, such as that by Desmond Young, were positively adulatory.") Young had served in North Africa in the Indian Army in a public relations capacity, and was once taken prisoner by Rommel's troops. Young interviewed Rommel's widow extensively and worked with several individuals who had been close to him, including Hans Speidel, with Liddell Hart also supporting the project. Speidel had already written in 1946 that he planned to turn Rommel into "the hero of the German people", to give them a positive role model. Rommel was a suitable candidate, since the manner of his death had led to the assumption that he had not been a supporter of Nazism. Young subscribed to this view, subtly conveying that Rommel served the regime, but was not part of it. The result was predictably positive, "bordering on hagiography", according to the historian Patrick Major. (Note: Patrick Major: "Young had relied extensively on interviews with the Field Marshal's surviving widow, son and former comrades so that the positive picture that emerged is perhaps hardly surprising. Yet the overall effect bordered on hagiography.")

The reception of The Desert Fox in Britain was enthusiastic: the book went through eight editions in a year. Young's biography was another step in the development of the Rommel myth, with Rommel emerging as an active, if not a leading, plotter. Speidel contributed as well, starting, from the early 1950s, to bring up Rommel's and his own role in the plot, thus boosting Speidel's suitability for a future role in the new military force of the Federal Republic, the Bundeswehr, and then in NATO.

The book was not without its detractors. The review in Time magazine noted the legendary status Rommel had achieved in his lifetime and quoted another review that described Rommel as "the British army's favorite German general." The Time reviewer concluded that the book was "just this side of hero worship". Quoting Ernest Bevin, a noted Labour politician, it alluded to the book being an example of the "trade union of generals" in action: Field Marshal Claude Auchinleck, in a foreword to the book, honoured Rommel "as a soldier and a man", and Field Marshal Archibald Wavell included him "among the chosen few, among the very brave, the very true". The reviewer noted the obvious admiration Young had for the German generals, and that the book may well "have been written by [one]". Richard Crossman, a Labour MP, objected to the portrayal of Rommel as an anti-Nazi, writing:

As a nation, we deceive ourselves into believing that there are two sorts of Germans—the Good German and the Bad German. The "Bad Germans" are Nazis, militarists, anti-democratic, and perpetrators of atrocities. The "Good Germans" are peace-loving democrats and real gentlemen. Ergo, since Rommel was a clean fighter, he must have been anti-Nazi, and men like him would make good allies of democracy against the Russians.

The historian Hugh Trevor-Roper commented that "the danger now is not that 'our friend Rommel' is becoming not a magician or a bogy-man, but too much of a hero". He pointed out Rommel's early proximity to Hitler; he described Rommel as representative of the connection between Nazism and the Wehrmacht and the support that the German officer corps offered for "Hitler's politics and Hitler's war".

=== The Desert Fox film ===
The 1951 film The Desert Fox: The Story of Rommel, based on Young's biography, portrayed Rommel in a sympathetic way, as a loyal, humane soldier and a firm opponent to Hitler's policies. The film played up Rommel's disputed role in the conspiracy against Hitler, while omitting Rommel's early association with the dictator.

Writing in The Daily Telegraph, under the title "Rommel: A Flattering and Unconvincing Portrait", the journalist Malcolm Muggeridge, who had served in intelligence in North Africa during the war, commented that the film represented "a tendency towards collective schizophrenia whereas ... 'chivalry' towards a captured brigadier is in no wise incompatible with a foreign policy of perfidy and the brutal disregard for all the elementary decencies of civilised behaviour". Critical and public response in the U.S. was muted, but it was a commercial success in Britain, along with a less known 1953 film The Desert Rats, where James Mason reprised his portrayal of Rommel.

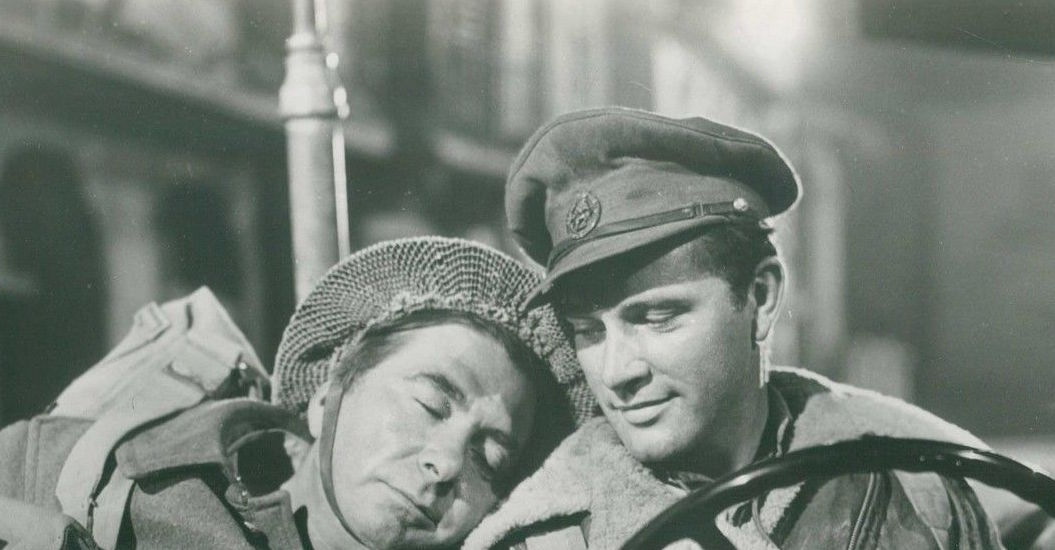
Mason as Rommel in The Desert Rats (1953).

The film received nearly universally positive reviews in Britain, while protests at the cinemas broke out in Vienna and Milan. Liddell Hart watched the film with a group of high-ranking British officers and reported being "pleasantly surprised". (Note: Major writes, quoting Liddell Hart: "'went to see it in a very critical frame of mind, from past experience of "Hollywood" handling of history', but 'was pleasantly surprised'".) Patrick Major argues that the desert war indeed proved a suitable space to effect the reconciliation among the former enemies. The British popular history focused on that theatre of war, almost to the exclusion of all others. He states that The Desert Fox had a "catalytic effect" in creating an image of the German armed forces that would be acceptable to the British public. Rommel was thus successfully integrated into the myth of the clean Wehrmacht. Petra Rau argues that Mason's Rommel (Contrasting with Five Graves to Cairo, Rommel here was presented as representation of British virtues and thus a sympathetic figure), like other "Good Germans" in popular culture, is not portrayed as representative of Germans, but rather, an exceptional case who was surrounded by real Nazis.

=== The Rommel Papers ===
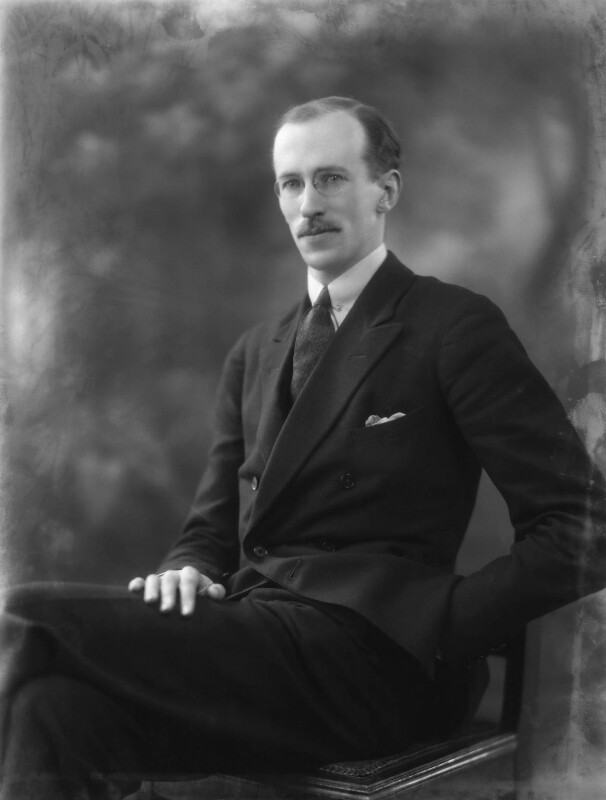
British historian B. H. Liddell Hart's introduction to The Rommel Papers drew comparisons between Rommel and Lawrence of Arabia, "two masters of desert warfare".

1953 saw the publication of Rommel's writings of the war period as The Rommel Papers, edited by the British journalist and historian B. H. Liddell Hart, the former Wehrmacht officer Fritz Bayerlein, who served on Rommel's staff in North Africa, and Rommel's widow and son. The volume contained an introduction and commentary by Liddell Hart.

The historian Mark Connelly argues that The Rommel Papers was one of the two foundational works that led to a "Rommel renaissance" and "Anglophone rehabilitation", the other being Young's biography. The book contributed to the perception of Rommel as a brilliant commander; in an introduction, Liddell Hart drew comparisons between Rommel and Lawrence of Arabia, "two masters of desert warfare".

Meanwhile, Liddell Hart had a personal interest in the work: by having coaxed Rommel's widow to include material favourable to himself, he could present Rommel as his "pupil" when it came to mobile armoured warfare. Thus, Liddell Hart's "theory of indirect approach" became a precursor to the German blitzkrieg ("lightning war"). The controversy was described by the political scientist John Mearsheimer in his work The Weight of History, who concluded that, by "putting words in the mouths of German Generals and manipulating history", Liddell Hart was in a position to show that he had been at the root of the dramatic German successes in 1940.

=== Uncritical accounts ===
The trend continued with other uncritical biographies, such as Rommel as Military Commander (1968), by the former British soldier and author Ronald Lewin, and Knight's Cross: A Life of Field Marshal Erwin Rommel (1994), by the former British general David Fraser. These works focused on Rommel's military career, depoliticising it and presenting him strictly as a soldier.

In another work on the North African campaign, the 1977 The Life and Death of the Africa Korps, Lewin wrote that it was "necessary to assert that ... the purity of the desert purified the desert war", while Fraser focused on Rommel's battlefield performance and described him as a hero. Fraser's biography remains a work of high reputation, with Pier Paolo Battistelli praising it for the outstanding handling of the issue of Rommel's myth as well as his life and career in general. However, the work has been criticised by historian Mark Connelly as "encapsulat[ing] the post-1945 hagiographic approach". Connelly offers the example of Fraser's description of Rommel as one of the "great masters of manoeuvre in war", whose personality "transcends time" and "cuts like [a] sabre through the curtains of history".

The historian Patrick Major points out that a recent work, the 2002 book Alamein: War Without Hate by Colin Smith and John Bierman, borrowed the name of Rommel's posthumous memoirs for its subtitle. Connelly includes works by Sir John Squire and General Sir John Hackett in the uncritical tradition. In contrast, German biographies, such as by the journalist Wolf Heckmann, were far less sympathetic.

== Elements of the myth ==
Some early authors who wrote about Rommel during the war and post-war biographers use the word "legend" or "myth" when describing various pieces of propaganda and rumours that the Nazi government and the Allied press spread about the life and character of Rommel. These rumours usually ignored his middle-class background and highlighted his connection with the lower classes and his early adherence to National Socialism or Hitler, using several invented anecdotes. (Note: Charles F. Marshall: "With the German press showering him with encomiums, rumours about the Swabian's past appeared overnight like mushrooms, both in Germany and outside. Every day brought new ones: He had been a bricklayer and early comrade of Hitler; he had been a street-corner bully; he had been a policeman between the two wars and had studied at Tuebingen University; he had been a swashbuckling storm trooper and one of the first adherents of the Führer.") The most notable of these, according to Charles F. Marshall, was that Rommel was a storm trooper (which was designed by Nazi propaganda to show "what heights a storm trooper could claim" and promote the impression of Rommel as an ardent Nazi supporter at the same time), that several American encyclopaedias still published a decade after the war.

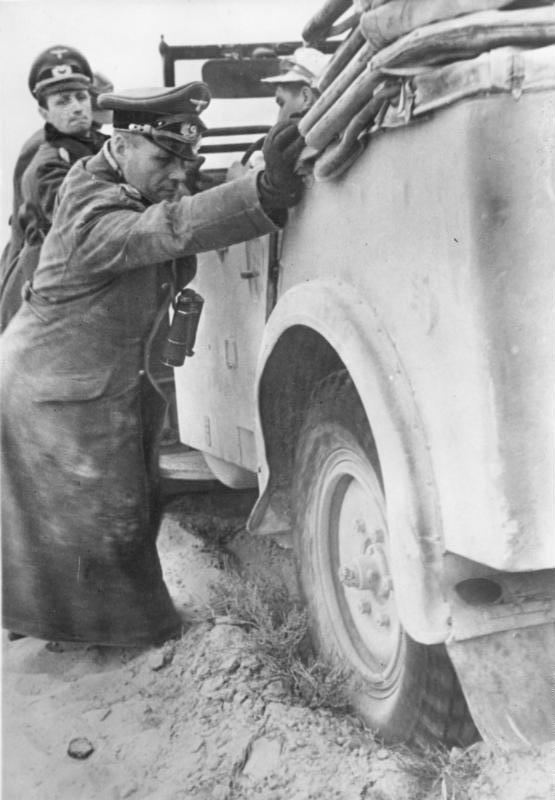
An iconic picture of Rommel as the "Common Man", helping to free up his staff car alongside his men.

According to the historian Mark Connelly, Young and Liddell Hart laid the foundation for the Anglo-American myth, which consisted of three themes: Rommel's ambivalence towards Nazism; his military genius; and the emphasis of the chivalrous nature of the fighting in North Africa. Their works lent support to the image of the "clean Wehrmacht" and were generally not questioned, since they came from British authors, rather than German revisionists. (Note: Kitchen: "The North African campaign has usually been seen, as in the title of Rommel's account, as 'War without Hate', and thus as further proof that the German army was not involved in any sordid butchering, which was left to Himmler's SS. While it was perfectly true that the German troops in North Africa fought with great distinction and gallantry, ... it was fortunate for their subsequent reputation that the SS murderers that followed in their wake did not have an opportunity to get to work." Kitchen further explains that the sparsely populated desert areas did not lend themselves to ethnic cleansing; that the German forces never reached Egypt and Palestine, which had large Jewish populations; and that, in the urban areas of Tunisia and Tripolitania, the Italian government constrained the German efforts to discriminate against or eliminate Jews who were Italian citizens.) The leading German news magazine Der Spiegel describes the myth as "Gentleman warrior, military genius". (Note: Spiegel Online: "Gentleman warrior, military genius. The legend of Erwin Rommel, the German Field Marshal who outfoxed the British in North Africa, lives on.")

According to Watson, the most dominant element in the Rommel myth is Rommel the Superior Soldier, the second being Rommel the Common Man, and the last one Rommel the Martyr. Rosie Goldschmidt Waldeck, writing in 1943, also takes note of the image of the general who fought with common soldiers, with an indelible youthfulness and apparent invulnerability.

Historian Sandra Mass considers the Rommel myth a hero cult, a synthesis of old and new hero cults and traditions culled primarily from Germany's largely imaginary colonial past, in particular the proletarian hero cult originally represented by Carl Peters and the bourgeois one represented by Paul von Lettow-Vorbeck. Rommel, as portrayed by this hero cult, was both chivalrous and ruthless, young and old, harsh and gentle, strong and righteous. Calder, Duffy and Ricci opine that Rommel's military brilliance provoked a masochistic tendency to romanticise a worthy opponent, that because he was skilled at his profession, he must have been an anti-Nazi hero.

== Reevaluation ==
Post-1990s scholarship examined Rommel's attitude towards National Socialism, his performance as a military commander, his role in the 20 July plot and his motivations, leading to a more diverse range of interpretations of Rommel and the elements of the myth.

=== Relationship with National Socialism ===
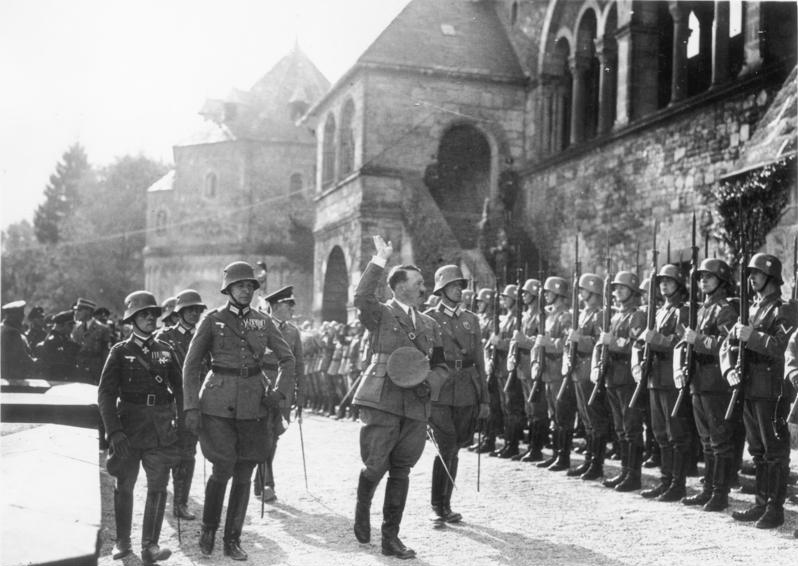
Adolf Hitler, accompanied by Rommel (far left), inspects the troops in Goslar, 1934. This was the first meeting between the two men.

Rommel was not a member of the Nazi Party. However, like other Wehrmacht officers, he welcomed Hitler's seizure of power. During his time in Goslar, he clashed with those Sturmabteilung (SA) men who attacked the Jews and others who supported them. Rommel thus showed sympathy towards Hitler's elimination of the SA, believing the worst was now over, although he opined that in the future the Führer should learn to see his own true strength and refrain from such illegal processes. Remy dated Rommel's support for Hitler as 1935, noting a speech in which Rommel praised Hitler for restoring the Germans' self-respect and establishment of the way towards an honourable and righteous peace, as well as efforts in alleviating the disadvantaged people's problems.

The historians Ralf Georg Reuth, David T. Zabecki, Bruce Allen Watson and Peter Caddick-Adams, state that Rommel was one of Hitler's favorite generals and that his close relationship with the dictator benefited both his inter-war and war-time career. Robert Citino describes Rommel as "not apolitical" and writes that he owed his career to Hitler, to whom his attitude was "worshipful", while the historian Charles Messenger describes Rommel's "growing admiration" towards Hitler following the invasion of Poland. (Note: Robert Citino: "His career had been based solely on Hitler's favor, and we might reasonably describe his attitude toward the Führer as worshipful." Peter Caddick-Adams: "As is now clear, Rommel had been very close to Hitler and the Third Reich ...") Speaking at The National WWII Museum's 2012 International Conference on World War II, the author Nigel Hamilton referred to Rommel as "quite a Nazi". This sympathy did not extend to the Party though. In this regard, he was similar to many other Wehrmacht soldiers, who, with encouragement from Hitler, erroneously believed the army to be the most important element of the regime. Rommel showed particular resentment towards the SA and later, the SS, for their brutality and absorption of resources and personnel.

The historian Alaric Searle recasts Rommel's early involvement with the Nazi regime, including his role as a liaison between Hitler Youth and the Wehrmacht. Young's biography had described Rommel's role in strictly military terms and alluded to a falling out between him and the Hitler Youth leader Baldur von Schirach on ideological grounds. In fact, Rommel had twice proposed a plan that would have subordinated Hitler Youth to the army, removing it from the NSDAP control. That went against Schirach's wishes, resulting in Rommel's quiet removal from the project. Searle describes as "patently false" another of Young's assertions, namely that Rommel first became close to Hitler because Hitler had read Infantry Attacks and wanted to meet the author in the fall of 1938. This casts doubt on the rest of Young's narrative as it pertains to Rommel's relationship with the dictator. Searle writes that, by this time, "Like many other front-line officers, with little awareness of the military planning underway, Rommel was simply trying to carry out his orders." Remy points out that the incident of Rommel using tanks to protect a journey of Hitler, which has been used by Reuth and Irving to prove that Rommel came to Hitler's attention in 1936, actually happened in 1939. In 1936, according to Remy, Rommel was only a part of the elaborate spectacle that welcomed Hitler, and there was no evidence for the interaction between the two.

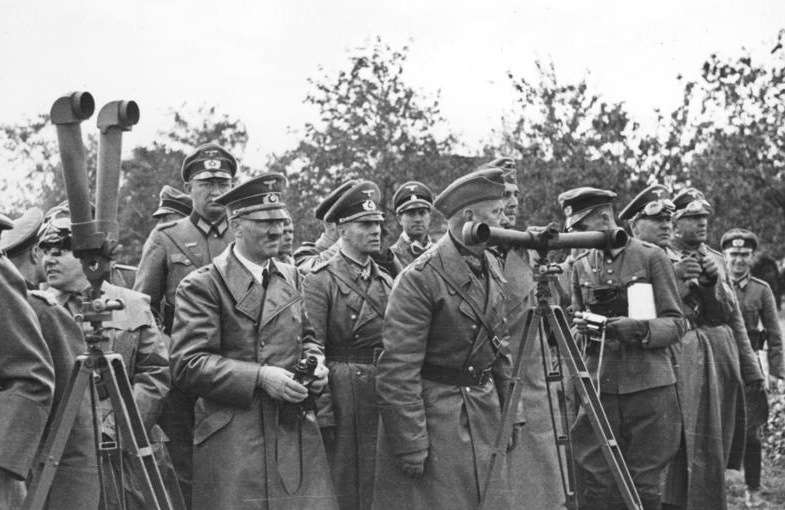
Rommel, to the right of Hitler from the perspective of the camera, in Poland, September 1939. During the campaign, Rommel enjoyed close proximity to the dictator.

Searle argues that Rommel not only "found favor with the Nazi regime, but ... was delighted with the preferential treatment he was receiving", including access to Hitler during the 1939 invasion of Poland. During the campaign, Rommel served as commander of the Führerbegleitbrigade battalion, tasked with guarding Hitler and his field headquarters. He attended Hitler's daily war briefings and had opportunities for one-on-one conversations with the dictator, which he proudly reported in letters to his wife. In a sign that he "lost touch with reality", as Searle puts it, Rommel wrote to his wife in October 1939 from the devastated Warsaw, where he was organising a victory parade: "There has been no water, no power, no gas, no food for two days. They have erected numerous barricades which blocked civilian movement and exposed people to bombardments from which they could not escape. The mayor estimated the number of the dead and injured to be 40,000 ... The inhabitants probably drew a breath of relief that we have arrived and rescued them."

In 1939, Rommel received a promotion from Hitler to the rank of Generalmajor ahead of more senior officers. Showalter notes that even at this early stage, Hitler already regarded Rommel as a model for the fusion of Germany's new and old orders. With an intervention by Hitler, Rommel was subsequently able to obtain command of an armoured (Panzer) division despite having been turned down by the army's personnel office, which had offered him command of a mountain division. Rommel's unprofessional conduct was noted by his fellow officers and added to his growing reputation as one of Hitler's favoured commanders. After the Fall of France, Rommel sent to him a specially prepared diary on the 7th Division and received a letter of thanks. Unknown to Rommel though, Hitler had barely looked at his diary and the letter was written by an adjutant. Remy remarks that by this time, Hitler still did not treat Rommel as a significantly important person.

When Rommel was being considered for appointment as Commander-in-Chief of the Army in the summer of 1942, Goebbels wrote in his diary that Rommel "is ideologically sound, is not just sympathetic to the National Socialists. He is a National Socialist; he is a troop leader with a gift for improvisation, personally courageous and extraordinarily inventive. These are the kinds of soldiers we need."

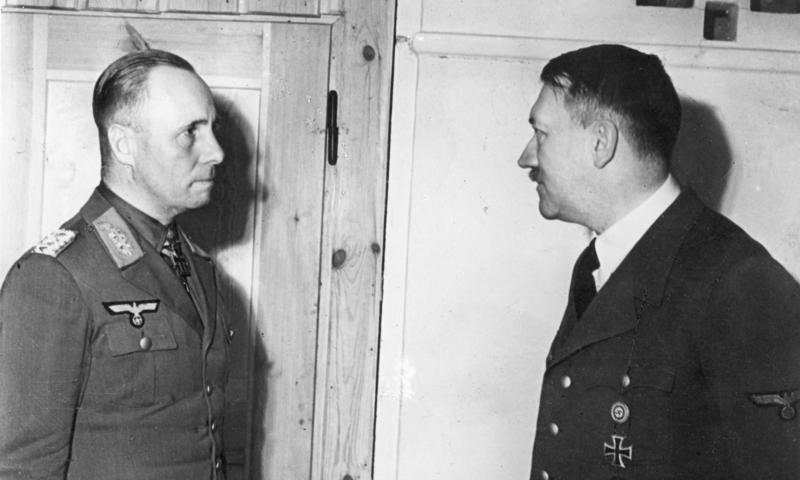
Rommel and Hitler in 1942. According to Rick Atkinson, Rommel was known as "the Führer's marshal".

Albert Kesselring said that Rommel "exercised an almost hypnotic influence on Hitler" and another colleague called him "the Führer's marshal". American writer Rick Atkinson concludes that Rommel was "loyal in his own fashion and as beguiled by Hitler as steel filings by a magnet ... Hitler was a bulwark against bolshevism, [Rommel] had told staff officers." In 1944, Rommel himself told Ruge and his wife that Hitler had a kind of irresistible magnetic aura ("Magnetismus") and was always seemingly in an intoxicated condition. Maurice Remy identifies that the point at which their relationship became a personal one was 1939 when Rommel proudly announced to his friend Kurt Hesse that he had "sort of forced Hitler to go with me (to the Hradschin Castle in Prague, in an open top car, without another bodyguard), under my personal protection ... He had entrusted himself to me and would never forget me for my excellent advice."

Despite this intimate relationship, he was not provided with basic information on Germany's strategic plan: "Rommel did not know that smashing the Soviet Union and major territorial acquisitions in the East would be the cornerstone of this plan. Nor did Rommel realise that Hitler saw no conflict of interest between Germany and the maritime power Great Britain, which he hoped to make an ally." He also had only a week's warning before the launch of Case White at the start of 1943. Messenger argues that Rommel's attitude towards Hitler changed only after the Allied invasion of Normandy, when Rommel came to realise that the war could not be won.

Rommel's political inclinations were a controversial matter even among the contemporary Nazi elites. Rommel himself, while showing support to some facets of the Nazi ideology and enjoying the propaganda machine that the Nazis had built around him, was enraged by the Nazi media's effort to portray him as an early Party member and son of a mason, forcing them to correct this misinformation. The Nazi elites were not comfortable with the idea of a national icon who did not wholeheartedly support the regime. Hitler and Goebbels, his main supporters, tended to defend him. Despite this, they gradually saw that his grasp of political realities and his views could be very different from theirs. (Note: Kubetzky: "Politics-wise, he has nothing but fantastic conceptions." (Goebbels' diary, after the assassination)) Hitler knew, though, that Rommel's optimistic and combative character was indispensable for his war efforts. When Rommel lost faith in the final victory and Hitler's leadership, Hitler and Goebbels tried to find an alternative in Manstein to remedy the fighting will and "political direction" of other generals but did not succeed.

Officials who did not like Rommel, such as Bormann and Schirach, whispered to each other that he was not a Nazi at all. Rommel's relationship to the Nazi elites, other than Hitler and Goebbels, was mostly hostile, although even powerful people like Bormann and Himmler had to tread carefully around Rommel. Himmler, who played a decisive role in Rommel's death, tried to blame Keitel and Jodl for the deed. And in fact the deed was initiated by them. They deeply resented Rommel's meteoric rise and had long feared that he would become the Commander-in-Chief. (Hitler also played innocent by trying to erect a monument for the national hero, on 7 March 1945) Franz Halder, after concocting several schemes to rein in Rommel through people like Paulus and Gause to no avail (even willing to undermine German operations and strategy in the process for the sole purpose of embarrassing him), concluded that Rommel was a madman with whom no one dared to cross swords because of "his brutal methods and his backing from the highest levels". (Rommel imposed a high number of courts-martial, but according to Westphal, he never signed the final order. Owen Connelly comments that he could afford easy discipline because of his charisma). Rommel for his part was highly critical of Himmler, Halder, the High Command and particularly Goering who Rommel at one point called his "bitterest enemy". (Note: Erwin Rommel: "During the whole of this period my bitterest enemy was Goering. I think he wanted to get me sacked in order to realise his own plans in North Africa.") Hitler realised that Rommel attracted the elites' negative emotions to himself, in the same way he generated optimism in the common people. Depending on the case, Hitler manipulated or exacerbated the situation in order to benefit himself, (Note: Erwin Rommel: "I was not very happy at the prospect of having to go on playing whipping-boy for the Fuehrer s H.Q, the Commando Supremo and the Luftwaffe.") although he originally had no intent of pushing Rommel to the point of destruction. (Even when informed of Rommel's involvement in the plot, hurt and vengeful, Hitler at first wanted to retire Rommel, and eventually offered him a last-minute chance to explain himself and refute the claims, which Rommel apparently did not take advantage of.) Ultimately Rommel's enemies worked together to bring him down.

Historian Thomas Vogel opines that Rommel was not a Nazi, if one uses the definition the Nazis themselves used, considering that although he did everything in his power to make his country strong again, he showed no support towards the racial policies or other aspects of the regime.

Maurice Remy concludes that, unwillingly and probably without ever realising it, Rommel was part of a murderous regime, although he never actually grasped the core of Nazism. Peter Lieb sees Rommel as a person who could not be put into a single drawer, although problematic by modern moral standards, and suggests people should personally decide for themselves whether Rommel should remain a role model or not. He was a Nazi general in some aspects, considering his support for the leader cult (Führerkult) and the Volksgemeinschaft, but he was not an antisemite, nor a war criminal, nor a radical ideological fighter. Historian Cornelia Hecht remarks "It is really hard to know who the man behind the myth was," noting that in numerous letters he wrote to his wife during their almost 30-year marriage, he commented little on political issues as well as his personal life as a husband and a father.

=== Military reputation ===
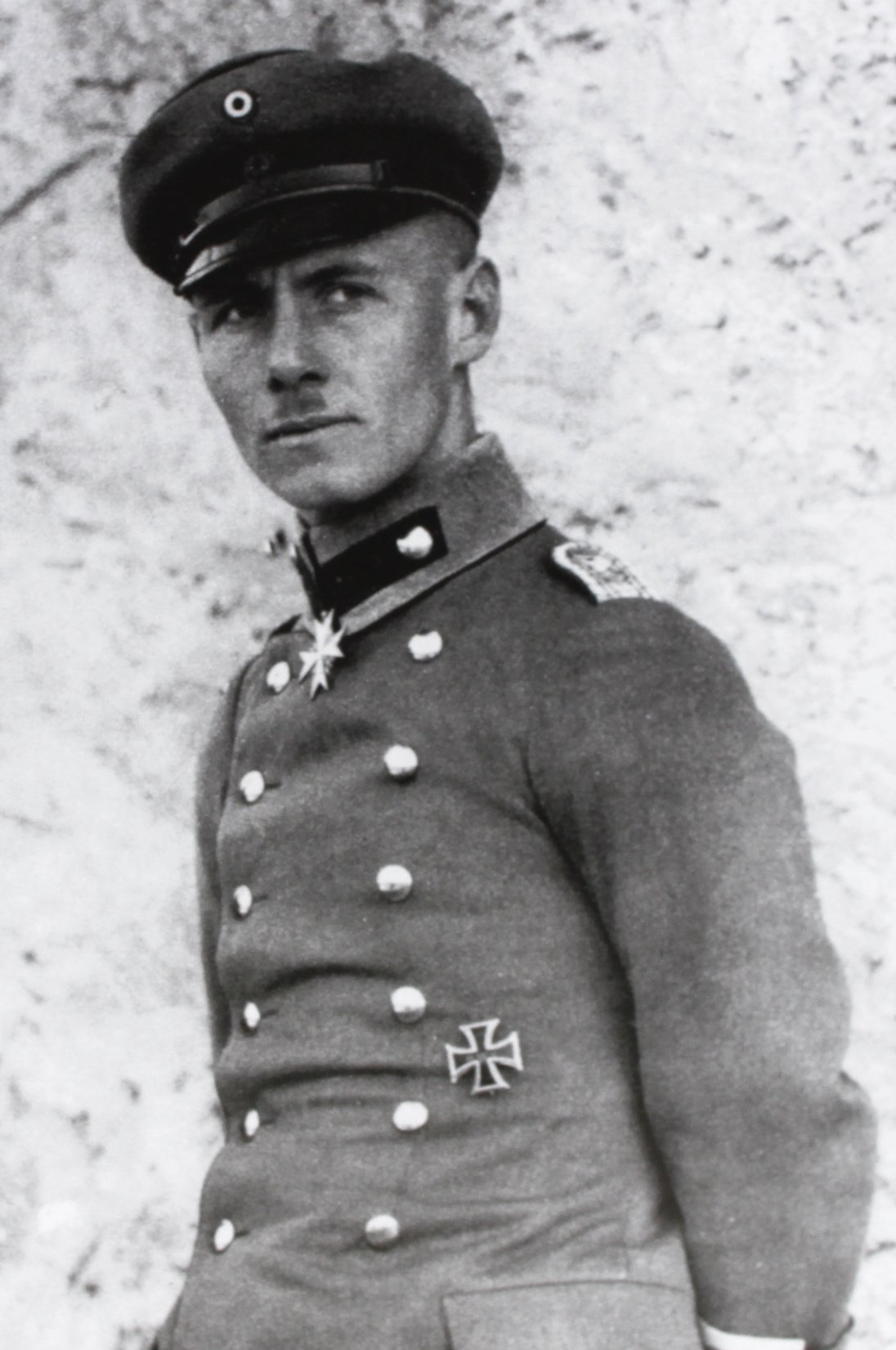
Erwin Rommel, 1917

==== During the war ====
Rommel's military reputation developed during the course of the war. British military and political figures contributed to the heroic image of the man as Rommel resumed offensive operations in January 1942 against the British forces weakened by redeployments to the Far East. Speaking in the House of Commons, Churchill addressed the British defeats and described Rommel as an "extraordinary bold and clever opponent" and a "great field commander". The trend continued after the war following the publication of The Desert Fox, which also portrays staff officers like Wilhelm Keitel, Alfred Jodl and Franz Halder, who opposed Rommel on strategic issues, as having ulterior motives in smearing him. Former military opponents in Britain described Rommel as a brilliant commander and a resistance fighter, the "good German", with one senior military figure comparing Rommel to legendary military leader Belisarius. The praise led Bernard Montgomery's former deputy, Brian Horrocks, to argue in his 1950 article "The Rommel Myth Debunked" that the Eighth Army beat Rommel's Afrika Korps "fair and square".

==== After the war ====
In the years after the war, Rommel's reputation was influenced by the works of Liddell Hart and Desmond Young which praised him as a tactical genius.

Rommel's military reputation has been controversial in modern times, especially regarding his operational and strategic decisions.

While nearly all military practitioners acknowledge Rommel's excellent tactical skills and personal bravery, some, such as U.S. major general and military historian David T. Zabecki of the United States Naval Institute, consider Rommel's performance as an operational level commander to be highly overstated and that other officers share this belief. Zabecki notes that Rommel's brilliant tactical moves were logistically unsustainable, which eventually led to a strategic defeat. (Note: According to Zabecki, Rommel's insubordination also played a role, leading to a calamitous misuse of resources when Rommel went over the head of his superior, Field Marshal Albert Kesselring, to appeal directly to Hitler to approve an assault on Egypt instead of occupying Malta, as Kesselring and OKW were planning.) General Klaus Naumann, who served as Chief of Staff of the Bundeswehr, agrees with Charles Messenger that Rommel had challenges on the operational level, and states that Rommel's violation of the unity of command principle, bypassing the chain of command in Africa, was unacceptable. (Note: Klaus Naumann: "Rommel's way out in Africa—bypassing the chain of command by seeking direct access to Hitler—must never be taken as an example to be followed." Naumann states that, as "one of the battle-proven principles", "unity of command must be preserved". Rommel did not follow this principle, which allowed him to achieve some tactical victories, but this contributed to eventual operational and strategic failure in North Africa.) The German biographer Wolf Heckmann describes Rommel as "the most overrated commander of an army in world history". In 1977, Martin van Creveld started the reevaluation of Malta's impact on supply situations and concluded that Rommel was largely responsible for his supply problems (caused by overextended supply lines which prevented the Afrika Korps from receiving the supplies that the Italians were able to provide in adequate numbers). According to Creveld, the capacity of Libyan ports were too small and the distances to be overcome too great for Rommel to advance a more ambitious plan than Hitler's original one of defending a limited area.

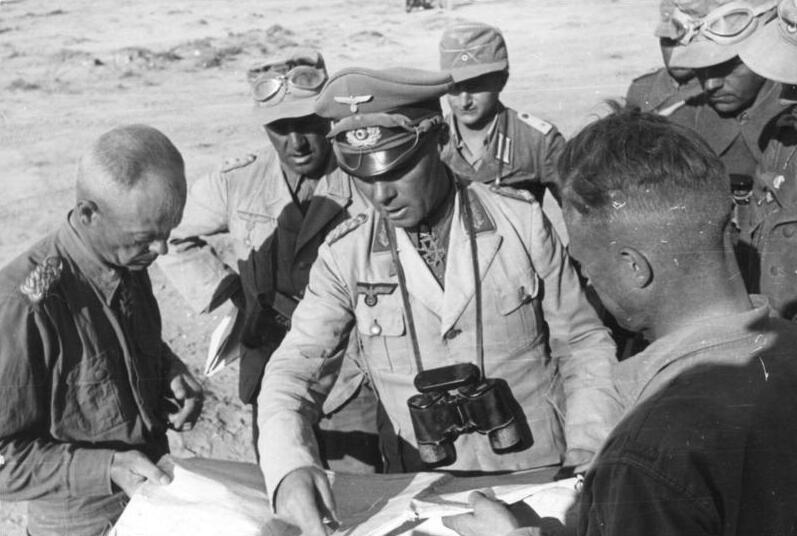
Rommel with Georg von Bismarck and Fritz Bayerlein, 1942 (Bundesarchiv Bild 101I-785-0286-33)

Nevertheless, there is also a notable number of officers who admire his methods, like Norman Schwarzkopf who described Rommel as a genius at battles of movement, saying: "Look at Rommel. Look at North Africa, the Arab-Israeli wars, and all the rest of them. A war in the desert is a war of mobility and lethality. It's not a war where straight lines are drawn in the sand and [you] say, 'I will defend here or die." Ariel Sharon deemed the German military model used by Rommel to be superior to the British model used by Montgomery. His compatriot Moshe Dayan likewise was known to admire and study Rommel. Wesley Clark states that "Rommel's military reputation, though, has lived on, and still sets the standard for a style of daring, charismatic leadership to which most officers aspire." During the recent desert wars, Rommel's military theories and experiences attracted great interest from policymakers and military instructors. Chinese military leader Sun Li-jen had the laudatory nickname "Rommel of the East".

Certain modern historians, such as Larry T. Addington, Niall Barr and Robert Citino, are skeptical of Rommel as an operational, let alone strategic, level commander. They point to Rommel's lack of appreciation for Germany's strategic situation, his misunderstanding of the relative importance of his theatre to the German High Command, his poor grasp of logistical realities, and, according to the historian Ian Beckett, his "penchant for glory hunting". Citino credits Rommel's limitations as an operational level commander as "materially contributing" to the eventual demise of the Axis forces in North Africa, (Note: Robert Citino: "His disinterest in the dreary science of logistics, his love of action, his tendency to fly off to wherever the fighting was hottest—all of these qualities ... are problems in a commander under modern conditions, and they all contributed materially to the disaster that ultimately befell him and his army in the desert.") Meanwhile, Addington focuses on Rommel's disobedience and struggle over the North Africa strategy, whereby his initial brilliant success resulted in "catastrophic effects" for Germany in this theatre of war.

The historian Geoffrey P. Megargee refers to Rommel as a "talented tactical leader", but points out his playing the German and Italian command structures against each other to his advantage. Rommel used the confused structure of the OKW (Supreme Command of the Wehrmacht), the OKH (Supreme High Command of the Army) and the Comando Supremo (Italian Supreme Command) to disregard orders that he disagreed with or to appeal to whatever authority he felt would be most sympathetic to his requests. Rommel often went directly to Hitler with his needs and concerns, taking advantage of the favoritism that the Führer displayed towards him and adding to the German High Command's distrust of him.

More sympathetic authors point out complex situations that Rommel had to face. Brian Hanley, from USNI's Editorial Board of Directors, comments that Rommel was beaten the moment he arrived in Africa, considering the Allied troops outnumbered the Afrika Korps and they worked under a much more straightforward chain of command, while orders sent from Berlin to North Africa were rarely kept confidential. Hanley sees Rommel turning German and Italian military authorities against each other as turning liabilities into advantages and that he repeatedly created operational miracles that made a strategic investment in the Africa theatre attractive in 1942. Also, according to Hanley, if Rommel stood still, his enemy's strength would accumulate while his own, depending on an uncertain supply line, would diminish, thus he needed the British stocks of supply to deal with his logistical problems.

Some historians take issue with Rommel's absence from Normandy on the day of the Allied invasion, 6 June 1944. He had left France on 5 June and was at home on the 6th celebrating his wife's birthday. (According to Rommel, he planned to proceed to see Hitler the next day to discuss the situation in Normandy). Zabecki calls his decision to leave the theatre in view of an imminent invasion "an incredible lapse of command responsibility". Lieb remarks that Rommel displayed real mental agility, but the lack of an energetic commander, together with other problems, caused the battle largely not to be conducted in his concept (which is the opposite of the German doctrine), although the result was still better than Geyr's plan. Lieb also opines that while his harshest critics (who mostly came from the General Staff) often said that Rommel was overrated or not suitable for higher commands, envy was a big factor here.

T.L. McMahon argues that while Rommel no doubt possessed operational vision, he did not have the strategic resources to effect his operational choices while his forces provided the tactical ability to accomplish his goals, and the German staff and system of staff command were designed for commanders who led from the front, and in some cases he might have chosen the same options as Montgomery (a reputedly strategy-oriented commander) had he been put in the same conditions. According to Steven Zaloga, tactical flexibility was a great advantage of the German system, but in the final years of the war, Hitler and his cronies like Himmler and Goering had usurped more and more authority at the strategic level, leaving professionals like Rommel increasing constraints on their actions. Martin Blumenson considers Rommel a general with a compelling view of strategy and logistics, which was demonstrated through his many arguments with his superiors over such matters, although Blumenson also thinks that what distinguished Rommel was his boldness, his intuitive feel for the battlefield. (Upon which Schwarzkopf also comments "Rommel had a feel for the battlefield like no other man.").

Joseph Forbes comments that: "The complex, conflict-filled interaction between Rommel and his superiors over logistics, objectives and priorities should not be used to detract from Rommel's reputation as a remarkable military leader", because Rommel was not given powers over logistics, and because if only generals who attain strategic-policy goals are great generals, such highly regarded commanders as Robert E. Lee, Hannibal, Charles XII would have to be excluded from that list. General Siegfried F. Storbeck, Deputy Inspector General of the Bundeswehr (1987–1991), remarks that, Rommel's leadership style and offensive thinking, although carrying inherent risks like losing the overview of the situation and creating overlapping of authority, have been proved effective, and have been analysed and incorporated in the training of officers by "us, our Western allies, the Warsaw Pact, and even the Israel Defense Forces". Maurice Remy defends his strategic decision regarding Malta as, although risky, the only logical choice. (Note: Remy: Kesselring, ... in his memoirs that criticises the five-year younger and much more popular Rommel, ... he already knew at least since the war's end about American arms shipment and intention to intervene which would render the strategical value of Malta meaningless, that left Rommel only one choice ...)

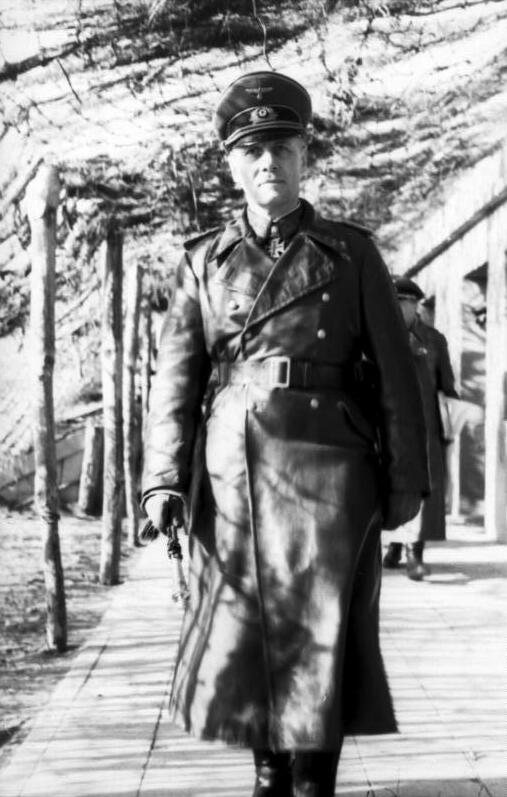
Erwin Rommel at the Atlantic Wall, France March 1944 (Bundesarchiv Bild 101I-719-0223-20).

Daniel Allen Butler writes that if Rommel was not a formally trained strategist, he developed himself into one, becoming able to grasp strategic opportunities that others missed. Starting as a compulsive commander who imperilled his command, and his superiors' plans in Africa, he realized that his opponent's army was the main objective and not the mere holding of territory. Butler writes that it was unfair to blame Rommel considering that he had been kept ignorant of Operation Barbarossa. Butler also questions the need to obey his superiors' higher strategy, considering that Hitler never had a coherent grand strategy. Reinhard Stumpf opines that Rommel actually had approval of his German (and later Italian) superiors (including Hitler and the High Command) in conducting the Afrika Korps as a mobile striking force and for his offensives. With such a weak force, he came to depend on an automaticity (that required constant successful attacks) that ceased to function once he gradually lost equipment superiority, air cover and good intelligence (which, in combination with good leadership, allowed the possibility to offset numerical inferiority to some extent). This applied also in the case of Malta: even if the island had been captured, the army's condition would not have been improved immediately, but holding the ground meant Rommel would lose the initiative forever. According to Maurice Remy, Rommel should not be blamed regarding strategic matters, considering Hitler and Mussolini had prepared the African offensive strategy from the beginning, despite the warnings of Brauchitsch and Halder regarding the planned invasion of Russia (that Rommel was not informed of). As the African campaign progressed, Rommel became aware of the strategic and supply situation, but his superiors (among them Kesselring) continued to ask him to advance further and promise that the supplies would reach the battlefield in time. Like Hanley and Stumpf, Remy saw Rommel's successes as working against him: his superiors assumed that despite his constant requests for more forces and supplies, he could manage with the minimum. Remy also opines that Rommel's plan for the defence of the Atlantic coastline was the correct one, although he too made a mistake in seeing Calais as the main landing zone.

Others like Stroud, Krause and Phillips opine that even Rommel's recklessness and disobedience during the invasion of France benefitted the German cause, while rescuing Hitler's mercurial objectives and inventing the actual application of Blitzkrieg ("lightning war"), and it was Hitler who downgraded strategic victory to operational victory. According to Alan J. Levine, contrary to the allegation that he was only a genius tactician without a good grasp of logistics, Rommel was a clearer thinker than most of his colleagues (shown by his judgements on developing situations) and although he was the most defeatist German general, there was a serious qualification to his pessimism and he was capable of displaying a surprising amount of energy in building the Normandy defense at the same time.

MacGregor Knox, whose works draw largely on Italian sources, opines that rather than technical and expertise weaknesses, effectiveness in war ultimately depends on culture, the command style and ethos, which in turn breed technological imagination and force structure. He points out that the few Italian mobile units fighting together with the Afrika Korps benefitted from working under Rommel, who helped them cope with rapidly changing situations in a war without fixed fronts, despite interference from Ettore Bastico. Marvin Knorr expresses a sympathetic view of Rommel's attitude to the General Staff, saying that their attitudes towards officers of middle class like him made it understandable that he was wary about them, and worried that the officers they sent to him would report on him or try to take over. Despite this, he came to trust and depend on these staff officers, like Friedrich von Mellenthin and Siegfried Westphal, who in turn proved their talent and loyalty. Rick Atkinson acknowledges Rommel's "audacity, tactical brilliance, and personal style", also noting that he "had an uncanny ability to dominate the minds of his adversaries".

Some authors like Stumpf and Lewin opine that while Creveld's statistics regarding the losses of supplies are not wrong and that the vast distances were a big problem, the failure of the seaborne supply lines was still a deciding factor because operationally effective supplies often failed to arrive at decisive moments of the campaigns. Douglas Austin points out that the overall port capacity at Tobruk and Benghazi was actually sufficient and that the recently published Enigma intercepts show that it was the bulk losses at sea (and not unloading or getting the supplies to forward areas) that had the greater impact on Rommel's decisions as well as those of other German commanders, like Kesselring. Levine dismisses poor port capacity and lack of transport vehicles as the Afrika Korps' crucial weaknesses, citing evidences gathered on British intelligence by Hinsley and Bennett. Others point out Rommel's dependence on captured resources as compensation for the unstable supply lines and unfulfilled promises (by 1942, 85% of his transport were captured vehicles). Butler opines that the myth of Rommel's bad logistical management is the result of rumours started by Halder. Lieb also opines that while his harshest critics (who mostly came from the General Staff) often said that Rommel was overrated or not suitable for higher commands, envy was a big factor here (Simon Ball also notes that this was the single group of people in the postwar West who had an interest in denigrating Rommel, who had never been one of them, while he opines that various elements in English and German post-war government and military circles had an interest in praising him as well).

=== Role in the 20 July plot ===
The extent of Rommel's involvement in the military's resistance against Hitler or 20 July plot is difficult to ascertain, as people most directly involved did not survive, and limited documentation of the conspirators' plans and preparations exists. Thus, Rommel's participation remains ambiguous, and the perception of it largely has its source in subsequent events (especially Rommel's forced suicide) and the post-war accounts by surviving participants.

According to a post-war account by Karl Strölin, the Oberbürgermeister of Stuttgart at that time, he and two other conspirators, Alexander von Falkenhausen and Carl Heinrich von Stülpnagel, began efforts to bring Rommel into the anti-Hitler conspiracy in early 1944. On 15 April 1944, Rommel's new chief of staff, Hans Speidel, arrived in Normandy and reintroduced Rommel to Stülpnagel. Speidel had previously been connected to Carl Goerdeler, the civilian leader of the resistance, but not to the plotters led by Stauffenberg, and only came to the attention of Stauffenberg due to his appointment to Rommel's headquarters. The conspirators felt they needed the support of a field marshal on active duty, and gave instructions to Speidel to bring Rommel into their circle.

Speidel met with former foreign minister Konstantin von Neurath and Strölin on 27 May in Germany, ostensibly at Rommel's request, although the latter was not present. Neurath and Strölin suggested opening immediate surrender negotiations with the West, and, according to Speidel, Rommel agreed to further discussions and preparations. However, around the same time the plotters in Berlin were not aware that Rommel had reportedly decided to take part in the conspiracy. On 16 May, they informed Allen Dulles, through whom they hoped to negotiate with the Western Allies, that Rommel could not be counted on for support.

Rommel opposed assassinating Hitler. After the war, his widow maintained that Rommel believed an assassination attempt would spark a civil war. Historian Ian Beckett argues that "there is no credible evidence that Rommel had more than limited and superficial knowledge of the plot" and concludes that Rommel would not have acted to aid the plotters on 20 July, while Ralf Georg Reuth contends that "there was no indication of any active participation of Rommel in the conspiracy". Historian Richard J. Evans concluded that he knew of a plot, but was not involved.

What is not debated are the results of the failed bomb plot of 20 July. Many conspirators were arrested, and the dragnet expanded to thousands. Consequently, it did not take long for Rommel to come under suspicion, beginning with evidence the SS obtained from Stülpnagel who mentioned Rommel in delirium after his suicide attempt. Rommel's name also came up in confessions by Stülpnagel's personal adviser, Caesar von Hofacker, and was included in Goerdeler's papers on a list of potential supporters. The author and cinematographer Maurice Philip Remy discovered a memo from Martin Bormann, the head of the Nazi Party Chancellery, dating from 28 September 1944 in which the Chief of the Party Chancellery, and Personal Secretary to Hitler, stated that "former General Stülpnagel, former Colonel Hofacker, Kluge's meanwhile executed nephew Lieutenant-Colonel Rathgens and other defendants still alive gave all testimony that Field-Marshal Rommel was indeed in the picture; Rommel agreed that he would be at the new government's disposal after a successful plot".

According to eavesdropped conversations between German generals in British captivity, edited by the historian Sönke Neitzel, General Heinrich Eberbach, the former commander of the 5th Panzer Army, claimed on 14 September 1944 that Rommel had told him in Normandy, just a few days before the plot, that Hitler and his entourage would have to be killed, if there was any chance for Germany to bring the war to a satisfactory end. Summarising the most recent findings on Rommel's role in the 20 July plot, Peter Lieb concludes that:

[Rommel] did not play any role in the operational preparations for the plot against Hitler and we do not know which post he was supposed to assume after a successful coup. Hence, the Field-Marshal was definitely not part of the most inner circle of the 20 July plotters. At the same time, however, he was more than just a mere sympathiser and paid for this with his life. He consequently deserves a firm place in the military resistance against Hitler to a greater extent than it has recently been acknowledged in academia and in public.

Maurice Remy thinks that the emphasis should be on his plan for a separate peace with the West (his intention was not to continue Hitler's murderous war in the East, but to prevent disasters that might happen to Germany if the Soviet army arrived), which was devised with concrete details and carried out at great personal risk.

=== Analysis of motivations ===
Rommel was an ambitious man who took advantage of his proximity to Hitler and willingly accepted the propaganda campaigns designed for him by Goebbels. He sought to level the playing field for non-nobles, and also supported militarism and a strong German Empire, while treating people only according to their merits. He did not display hatred to people of noble descent, and in fact was a throwback to the medieval knight in his personal traits, appearing well-versed in the ancient customs of chivalry, which helped to attract admiration from the British who saw in him a romantic archetype. Rommel classed himself as a traditionalist regarding military ethics and a modernist regarding warfare techniques. Citino believes that under the modern veneer, Rommel's story (as well as his style of warfare, including the negative points) was actually the last manifestation of an older Prussian tradition which began with Georg von Derfflinger, in which the lowly outsider (he was not Prussian by birth) chose to serve the Prussian king, in whom alone he put his trust and in whose service he was willing to attract the ill will from all the other powerful people, as had Seydlitz and Ziethen. (Reuth also comments that Rommel tended to blame the people around Hitler for all the bad of the regime while seeing Hitler, the sender of criminal orders, as the source of all that was good). Certain authors remark that he also sought military glory and personal recognition, most of all from Hitler on whom, according to Watson, Rommel projected his idea of the German people's will. (Note: Klaus Naumann: "Rommel was used by the Nazi regime to create a myth. He tolerated this since he had a strong dose of personal ambition and vanity.")

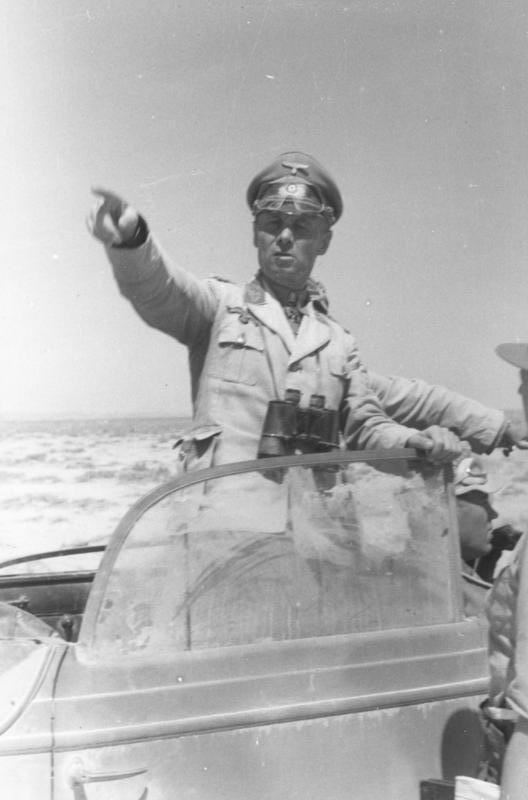
Rommel posing for a propaganda photo in North Africa. According to Klaus Naumann, "Rommel was used by the Nazi regime to create a myth. He tolerated this since he had a strong dose of personal ambition and vanity."

A number of contemporaries noted Rommel's vanity. In the memorandum regarding Rommel's betrayal, Martin Bormann remarked, "He had himself photographed from dawn to dusk ... He is so vain he does not wear glasses". (Rommel was near-sighted in one eye and far-sighted in the other.) Historian Samuel Mitcham however, noted that Martin Bormann had held a grudge against the Generalfeldmarschall as far back as 1939. Some modern authors, such as Storbeck, are more sympathetic. He states that Rommel's perceived vanity developed as a reaction to the pressure aristocratic and high-bourgeois colleagues put on him. The psychologist Norman F. Dixon remarks that although Rommel showed towards Hitler an admiration that later faded, he did not display the urge to submit himself to higher authority or powerful father figures, considering that had he been such a person, he would not have been so outspoken or risked himself in the struggle against people like Himmler, Keitel or Jodl. Showalter comments that Rommel was a man who brought his work home, but not to the point of obsession with personal promotions, considering he had spent no effort in building a social circle (his wife was the person who determined their family's social agenda and the guest list, and the circle she chose was not wide nor prominent).

Messenger points out that Rommel had many reasons to be grateful to Hitler, including his interference to arrange for him to receive command of an armoured division, his elevation to the status of a national hero, and continued interest and support from the dictator. Remy states that the attachment to Hitler went much deeper than any gratefulness could explain, and that Hitler had become Rommel's source of motivation. Some, like Randall Hansen, highlight the similarities in background and personality that facilitated the rapport between the two, while others, like Richard Overy, state that Rommel's main appeal to Hitler was that he was everything Hitler was not, while the political scientist Roland Detsch, in a review of Maurice Remy's book, comments that despite Remy's efforts, the strange relationship remains hard to understand. Wolfram Pyta remarks that Hitler did not compete with Rommel for the war leader image because the two complemented each other perfectly. They were similar in the sense that they were the only ones with a cultural presence and objects around whom German society's grand narrative was being built, thus Rommel was the only German general who would have been capable of challenging Hitler's rule, had he ever crossed the Rubicon from his "apolitical-to-the-core" military world and developed a serious, critical view of Hitler's political dealings. However, Rommel himself had fallen for Hitler's charisma almost until the end. Peter Lieb opines that the relationship between Rommel and Hitler is overrated—they liked each other but the relationship became worse and worse since the end of 1942 when Rommel began to see the consequences of Hitler's disastrous leadership as well as recognize the criminal character of the regime. According to Lieb, historians should focus more on Goebbels, whose propaganda built up Rommel. Italian generals considered Rommel apolitical, too: According to Scianna, when Badoglio took over Italy in 1943, the Allies became hopeful that a similar development would happen in Germany with Rommel as head of the new regime, but captured Italian generals rebuked this pipe-dream, telling them that Rommel, unlike other German generals, did not care about politics.

Caddick-Adams writes that Rommel was a "complicated man of many contradictions", while Beckett notes that "Rommel's myth ... has proved remarkably resilient" and that more work is needed to put him in proper historical context. Zabecki concludes that "the blind hero worship ... only distorts the real lessons to be learned from [his] career and battles", and Watson notes that the legend has been a "distraction" that obscured the evolution of Rommel as a military commander and his changing attitudes towards the regime that he served.

John Pimlott writes that Rommel was an impressive military commander who richly deserved his reputation as a leading exponent of mobile warfare, hampered by factors he could not control, although he usually accepted high risks and could become frustrated when forced on the defensive. On the other hand, Pimlott criticises Rommel for only disagreeing with Hitler for strategic reasons and, while accepting that Rommel did give chivalrous tone to his battles in Africa, he points out that this should not be used to ignore the responsibility Rommel must bear for promoting the Nazi cause with vigour. The same sentiment is held by Williamson Murray and Alan Millett who opine that Rommel, contrary to allegations that he was only a competent tactical commander, was the most outstanding battlefield commander of the war, who showed a realistic strategic view despite holding minimal control over strategy. They point out that, "like virtually the entire German officer corps", he was a convinced Nazi. While some, like Scianna, are more critical towards his strategical decisions but also dismiss negative myths such as Rommel's abandonment of his allies.

Cornelia Hecht, the author of the 2008 exhibition named Mythos Rommel and a book of the same name, explains that despite extensive research, it is hard to see who Rommel really was under all the layers of the myth. She comments that she would not describe Rommel as a resistance fighter, although he did support the assassination attempt. Patrick Major describes Rommel as someone who went along with the regime as long as it served his needs, a "fellow traveler rather than a war criminal". Summing up Rommel's career in a 2012 interview with Reuters, the historian Sönke Neitzel states:

On the one hand he didn't commit war crimes that we know of and ordered a retreat at El Alamein despite Hitler's order. But he took huge German casualties elsewhere and he was a servant of the regime. He was not exactly a shining liberal or Social Democrat. Mostly, he was interested in his career.

Historian Reuth observes that the modern German image of Rommel (a result of the Historikerstreit in the 1980s and debates on war guilt during the 1990s), as represented most notably by Maurice Rémy, is that of both a National Socialist and a hero of the Resistance. Reuth argues that "Rommel was neither one nor the other. He had understood neither National Socialism, nor the resistance to it. Like millions of Germans he followed Hitler into disaster and whilst doing so he believed he was only doing his duty."

== Historiography ==
Although the author David Irving and his works have now become controversial for his denial of the Holocaust, he is recognised as the historian who started the re-evaluation of Rommel. He was the first historian to gain access to a large number of Rommel's private letters, and his well-substantiated findings questioned Rommel's image as a "chivalrous resistance fighter". This biography, however, has been criticized by other authors Dowe and Hecht for manipulation and misrepresentation of primary sources, and even invention of verbatim quotations with the aim of portraying Hitler in a better light.

Works such as the 2002 documentary Mythos Rommel by Remy, and the book of the same name, and the 2004 book Rommel: Das Ende einer Legende (published in English in 2005 as Rommel: The End of a Legend) by German historian Ralf Georg Reuth, furthered the discussion on both Rommel and his myth. In the continued debate on Rommel and his legacy, Christopher Gabel criticises the documentary Rommel's War (made by historians Jörg Müllner and Jean-Christoph Caron) for using false analogy to prove that Rommel was a war criminal by association, without providing any evidence even of Rommel's knowledge about crimes in his areas of operation. According to Matthias Stickler, attacks on Rommel's integrity and attempts to link him to war crimes, which were started by the "journalist side" in the 1990s, have been largely repudiated by serious research despite having been repeatedly rehashed and refreshed by some authors and their epigones. Stickler gives recognition to both Remy and Reuth for offering possible explanations for Rommel's character evolution.

Numerous English-speaking authors use the "Rommel Myth" ambiguously, like Bruce Allen Watson who states that "the masks he wore reflected the genuine plurality of the man", or Jill Edwards, who notes that, below all the layers historians have removed and added to, what remains seems enough to qualify Rommel as, if controversial, a great captain. Others who mention and depict the myth as a phenomenon that is either hard to ascertain or has a core that reflects reality include Pier Paolo Battistelli, (Note: Battistelli: "The myth of Erwin Rommel – the 'Desert Fox' – has proved to be particularly long lasting. There are many historical issues surrounding his true merits as a military commander and the extent of his actual involvement in the anti-Hitler conspiracy, and yet on close inspection he comes across as a simple, straightforward man whose talents and character ensured his success in the very particular circumstances that arose throughout his career.") Randall Hansen, Ian Baxter, T.L. McMahon, Brighton, Rosie Goldschmidt Waldeck, Charles F. Marshall, Majdalany, Latimer, and Showalter.

A German author who uses the word Mythos in a critical manner is Ralph Giordano, (Note: Giordano: "Another brick is broken out of the mendacious myth of the legendary "Desert Fox" and alleged resistance fighter against Hitler, Field Marshal Erwin Rommel ...") who describes the phenomenon as one of the "Falsehoods of Tradition" in his book of the same name, which depicts how the image of Rommel has been a major basis for the warrior cult of the Bundeswehr. Sir David Hunt describes himself as being critical towards the Rommel mythology. While he has "the highest praise for his character", his impression of Rommel as a commander is a dashing cavalryman who gambled deep and lost in the end. Other authors who present popular narratives on Rommel as a misguided or deliberately falsified myth include James Sadkovich, who criticises both Rommel's supposed genius and his treatment of his Italian allies, and: James Robinson, Martin Kitchen, Alaric Searle, Robert Citino, Ralf Georg Reuth, Kenneth Macksey.

== See also ==
- Erwin Rommel in the Second World War
- Erwin Rommel and the Bundeswehr
- Myth of the clean Wehrmacht
- The Myth of the Eastern Front
- Speer myth
- Waffen-SS in popular culture
- Wehraboo

== Bibliography ==
- Addington, Larry H. (1967). "Operation Sunflower: Rommel Versus the General Staff". Military Affairs. 31 (3): 120–130. doi:10.2307/1984650. JSTOR 1984650.
- Atkinson, Rick (2002). An Army at Dawn. New York: Picador. ISBN 978-0-8050-8724-6.
- Atkinson, Rick (2013). The Guns at Last Light. New York: Henry Holt. ISBN 978-0-8050-6290-8.
- Austin, Douglas (2004). Malta and British Strategic Policy, 1925–43. Routledge. p. 20. ISBN 978-1135769383.
- Ball, Simon (2016). Alamein: Great Battles. Oxford University Press. ISBN 978-0-19-150462-4.
- Barnett, Correlli (1989). Hitler's Generals. Grove Press. ISBN 0802139949.
- Barr, Niall (2014). "Rommel in the Desert, 1941". In I. F. W. Beckett (ed.). Rommel Reconsidered. Mechanicsburg, PA: Stackpole Books. ISBN 978-0-8117-1462-4.
- Battistelli, Pier Paolo (2012). Erwin Rommel. Bloomsbury Publishing. ISBN 978-1-78096-471-3.
- Baxter, Ian (2014). Afrika Korps. Pen and Sword. ISBN 978-1-84415-683-2.
- Beckett, Ian (2014). "Introduction". In I. F. W. Beckett (ed.). Rommel Reconsidered. Mechanicsburg, PA: Stackpole Books. ISBN 978-0-8117-1462-4.
- Beevor, Antony (2012). The Second World War. New York: Back Bay Books. ISBN 978-0-316-02374-0.
- Blumenson, Martin (2001). Heroes Never Die: Warriors and Warfare in World War II. Cooper Square Press. ISBN 978-0-8154-1152-9.
- Boog, Horst; Rahn, Werner; Stumpf, Reinhard; Wegner, Bernd (2001). Germany and the Second World War: Volume 6: The Global War. OUP Oxford. p. 839. ISBN 978-0191606847.
- Brighton, Terry (2008). Masters of Battle: Monty, Patton and Rommel at War. New York: Viking. ISBN 978-0-670-91691-7.
- Brighton, Terry (2009). Patton, Montgomery, Rommel: Masters of War. Crown/Archetype. ISBN 978-1-4001-1497-9.
- Butler, Daniel Allen (2015). Field Marshal: The Life and Death of Erwin Rommel. Havertown, PA / Oxford: Casemate. ISBN 978-1-61200-297-2.
- Caddick-Adams, Peter (2012). Monty and Rommel: Parallel Lives. New York: The Overlook Press. ISBN 978-1-59020-725-3.
- Calder, Angus (2012). The People's War: Britain 1939–1945. Random House. pp. 242, 265, 304, 524, 564. ISBN 978-1-4481-0310-2.
- Ceva, Lucio (1990). "The North African Campaign, 1940–43: A Reconsideration". In John Gooch (ed.). Decisive Campaigns of the Second World War. Abingdon: Taylor & Francis. ISBN 978-0-7146-3369-5.
- Chambers, Madeline (2012). "The Devil's General? German film seeks to debunk Rommel myth". Reuters. Archived from the original on 11 December 2016.
- Citino, Robert (2007). Death of the Wehrmacht: The German Campaigns of 1942. University Press of Kansas. Archived from the original on 6 October 2016.
- Citino, Robert (2012). "Rommel's Afrika Korps". HistoryNet. Archived from the original on 11 December 2016.
- Coetzee, Daniel (2013). Philosophers of War: The Evolution of History's Greatest Military Thinkers. ABC-CLIO. ISBN 978-0-313-07033-4.
- Connelly, Mark (2014). "Rommel as icon". In I. F. W. Beckett (ed.). Rommel Reconsidered. Mechanicsburg, PA: Stackpole Books. ISBN 978-0-8117-1462-4.
- Connelly, Owen (2009). On War and Leadership: The Words of Combat Commanders from Frederick the Great to Norman Schwarzkopf. Princeton: Princeton University Press. ISBN 978-1-4008-2516-5.
- Creveld, Martin van (1977). Supplying War: Logistics from Wallenstein to Patton. Cambridge: Cambridge University Press. ISBN 052121730X.
- Detsch, Roland (2002). "Die andere Wahrheit". context politik: wissenschaft: kultur. Archived from the original on 11 December 2016.
- Deuel, Wallace R. (1943). A 'Model' Teuton; MEET MR. BLANK. By R.G. Waldeck. 179 pp. New York: G.P. Putnam's Boris.... Mr. Blank – The Model Teuton (The New York Times Book Review. Vol. II. Arno Press.
- Dick, Bernard F. (2015). The Star-Spangled Screen: The American World War II Film. University Press of Kentucky. ISBN 978-0-813-14895-3.
- Dixon, Norman F. (2016). On the Psychology of Military Incompetence. Basic Books. ISBN 978-0-465-09780-7.
- Dowe, Christopher; Hecht, Cornelia (2016). "Von Mythen, Legenden und Manipulationen. David Irving und seine verzerrende Deutungen von Erwin Rommel, Hans Speidel und Cäsar von Hofacker". In Haus der Geschichte Baden-Württemberg (ed.). Verräter? Vorbilder? Verbrecher? Kontroverse Deutungen des 20. Juli 1944 seit 1945. Frank & Timme GmbH. pp. 129–160. ISBN 978-3732902767.
- Duffy, James P.; Ricci, Vincent L. (2013). Target Hitler: The Many Plots to Kill Adolf Hitler. Enigma Books. ISBN 978-1-936274-03-1.
- Echternkamp, Jörg (2010). Die 101 wichtigsten Fragen – der Zweite Weltkrieg. C. H. Beck. ISBN 978-3-406-59314-7.
- Edwards, Jill (2012). El Alamein and the Struggle for North Africa: International Perspectives from the Twenty-first Century. Oxford University Press. ISBN 978-977-416-581-8.
- Evans, Richard J. (2009). The Third Reich at War. New York: Penguin. ISBN 978-0-14-101548-4.
- Fischer, Thomas (2014). "Rommel und Hitler". SWR. Archived from the original on 3 December 2017.
- Fraser, David (1993). Knight's Cross: A Life of Field Marshal Erwin Rommel. New York: HarperCollins.
- Friedmann, Jan (23 May 2007). "World War II: New Research Taints Image of Desert Fox Rommel". Spiegel Online. Archived from the original on 11 December 2016.
- Gabel, Christopher (2014). Great Commanders [Illustrated Edition]. Pickle Partners Publishing. ISBN 978-1-78289-446-9.
- Giordano, Ralph (2000). Die Traditionslüge: vom Kriegerkult in der Bundeswehr. Kiepenheuer & Witsch. ISBN 978-3-462-02921-5.
- Giordano, Ralph (2010). Mein Leben ist so sündhaft lang: ein Tagebuch. Kiepenheuer & Witsch. ISBN 978-3-462-04240-5.
- Goldschmidt Waldeck, Rosie (1943). Meet Mr. Blank: The Leader of Tomorrow's Germans. G. P. Putnam's sons.
- Hachten Wee, Patricia; Wee, Robert James (2004). World War II in Literature for Youth: A Guide and Resource Book. Scarecrow Press. ISBN 978-0-8108-5301-0.
- Hamilton, Nigel (2012). "Defeating the Desert Fox". The National WWII Museum.
- Hanley, Brian (2008). Planning for Conflict in the Twenty-first Century. Greenwood Publishing Group. ISBN 978-0-313-34555-5.
- Hansen, Randall (2014). Disobeying Hitler: German Resistance After Valkyrie. New York: Oxford University Press. p. 48. ISBN 978-0-19-992792-0.
- Hart, Russel A. (2014). "Rommel and the 20th July Bomb Plot". In F. W. Beckett (ed.). Rommel Reconsidered. Mechanicsburg, PA: Stackpole Books. ISBN 978-0-8117-1462-4.
- Hartmann, Bernd (2011). Panzers in the Sand: The History of Panzer-Regiment 5, 1942–45. Vol. II. Stackpole Books. p. 138. ISBN 978-0811744324.
- Holles, Everett (1945). Unconditional Surrender. Howell, Soskin. p. 227.
- Kitchen, Martin (2009). Rommel's Desert War: Waging World War II in North Africa, 1941–1943. Cambridge University Press. ISBN 978-0-521-50971-8.
- Kitchen, Martin (2014). A World in Flames: A Short History of the Second World War in Europe and Asia 1939–1945. Routledge. p. 84. ISBN 978-1-317-90094-8.
- Knopp, Guido (2013). Hitlers Krieger. C. Bertelsmann Verlag. ISBN 978-3-641-11998-0.
- Knorr, Major Marvin Jr. (2015). The Development Of German Doctrine And Command And Control And Its Application To Supporting Arms, 1832–1945. Pickle Partners. ISBN 978-1-78625-062-9.
- Knox, MacGregor (2000). Hitler's Italian Allies: Royal Armed Forces, Fascist Regime, and the War of 1940–1943. Cambridge University Press. p. 116. ISBN 978-1-139-43203-0.
- Krause, Michael D.; Phillips, R. Cody (2006). Historical Perspectives of the Operational Art. Government Printing Office. ISBN 978-0-16-072564-7.
- Latimer, Jon (2002). Alamein. Cambridge, MA: Harvard University Press. ISBN 978-0-674-01016-1.
- Levine, Alan J. (2007). D-Day to Berlin: The Northwest Europe Campaign, 1944–45. Stackpole Books. ISBN 978-1-4617-5085-7.
- Levine, Alan J. (1999). The War Against Rommel's Supply Lines, 1942–1943. Praeger. p. 183. ISBN 978-0275965211.
- Lewin, Ronald (1998) [1968]. Rommel As Military Commander. New York: B&N Books. ISBN 978-0-7607-0861-3.
- Lieb, Peter (2013). "Erwin Rommel. Widerstandskämpfer oder Nationalsozialist?" (PDF). Vierteljahrshefte für Zeitgeschichte. 61 (3). Degruyter: 303–343. doi:10.1524/vfzg.2013.0015. S2CID 147061655.
- Lieb, Peter (2014). "Rommel in Normandy". In Beckett, I. F. W. (ed.). Rommel Reconsidered. Mechanicsburg, PA: Stackpole Books. ISBN 978-0-8117-1462-4.
- Luvaas, Jay (1990). "Liddell Hart and the Mearsheimer Critique: A 'Pupil's' Retrospective" (PDF). Strategic Studies Institute. Archived from the original (PDF) on 22 May 2013.
- Macksey, Kenneth (1979). Rommel: Battles and Campaigns. Arms & Armour Press. ISBN 978-0-85368-232-5.
- Maier, Manfred (2013). "Vortrag Manfred Maier zu der Geschichte des Heidenheimer Rommeldenkmals". In Geschichtswerkstatt Heidenheim (ed.). Vorlage für die Arbeitsgruppe "Umgestaltung des Rommel-Denkmals". p. 49.
- Majdalany, Fred (2003). The Battle of El Alamein: Fortress in the Sand. University of Pennsylvania Press. pp. 31–32. ISBN 978-0-8122-1850-3.
- Major, Patrick (2008). "'Our Friend Rommel': The Wehrmacht as 'Worthy Enemy' in Postwar British Popular Culture". German History. 26 (4). Oxford University Press: 520–535. doi:10.1093/gerhis/ghn049.
- Marshall, Charles F. (1994). Discovering the Rommel Murder. Mechanicsburg, PA: Stackpole Books. ISBN 978-0-8117-4278-8.
- Mass, Sandra (2006). Weisse Helden, schwarze Krieger: zur Geschichte kolonialer Männlichkeit in Deutschland 1918–1964. Böhlau Verlag Köln Weimar. pp. 249, 252, 258, 294, 301. ISBN 978-3-412-32305-9.
- McMahon, T. L. (2014). Operational Principles: The Operational Art of Erwin Rommel and Bernard Montgomery. Pickle Partners. ISBN 978-1-78289-742-2.
- Mearsheimer, John (1988). Liddell Hart and the Weight of History. Ithaca, NY: Cornell University Press. ISBN 978-0-8014-2089-4.
- Megargee, Geoffrey P. (2000). Inside Hitler's High Command. Lawrence: Kansas University Press. ISBN 0-7006-1015-4.
- Messenger, Charles (2009). Rommel: Leadership Lessons from the Desert Fox. Basingstoke, NY: Palgrave Macmillan. ISBN 978-0-230-60908-2.
- Murray, Williamson (1995). "Knight's Cross, A Life of Field Marshal Erwin Rommel by David Fraser". The Journal of Military History. 59 (2). Virginia Military Institute and the George C. Marshall Foundation: 345–346. doi:10.2307/2944594. ISSN 1543-7795. JSTOR 2944594.
- Murray, Williamson; Millett, Allan Reed (2009). A War To Be Won: fighting the Second World War. Harvard University Press. ISBN 978-0-674-04130-1.
- Murray, Williamson (2011). Military Adaptation in War: With Fear of Change. Cambridge University Press. ISBN 978-1-139-91586-1.
- Naumann, Klaus (2009). "Afterword". In Charles Messenger (ed.). Rommel: Leadership Lessons from the Desert Fox. Basingstoke, NY: Palgrave Macmillan. ISBN 978-0-230-60908-2.
- Neitzel, Sönke (2005). Abgehört. Deutsche Generäle in britischer Kriegsgefangenschaft 1942–1945. Berlin: Propyläen. ISBN 978-3-548-60760-3.
- Pimlott, John, ed. (2014) [1994]. Rommel: In His Own Words. London: Amber Books. ISBN 978-1-78274-190-9.
- Pyta, Wolfram (2015). Hitler: Der Künstler als Politiker und Feldherr. Eine Herrschaftsanalyse. Siedler Verlag. ISBN 978-3-641-15701-2.
- Rau, Petra (2013). Our Nazis. Edinburgh University Press. pp. 132–134. ISBN 978-0748668663.
- Remy, Maurice Philip (2002). Mythos Rommel. Munich: Ullstein. ISBN 3-548-60385-8.
- Reuth, Ralf Georg (2005). Rommel: The End of a Legend. London: Haus Books. ISBN 978-1-904950-20-2.
- Robinson, James R. (1997). "The Rommel Myth". Military Review. 77 (5). Archived from the original on 8 March 2016 – via Questia.
- Rommel, Erwin (1982) [1953]. Liddell Hart, B. H. (ed.). The Rommel Papers. New York: Da Capo Press. ISBN 978-0-306-80157-0.
- Sadkovich, James J.; Hixson, Walter L. (2003). Of Myths and Men: Rommel and the Italians in North Africa, 1940–1942 (chapter) – The American Experience in World War II: The United States in the European theater. Taylor & Francis. pp. 238–267. ISBN 978-0-415-94033-7.
- Scianna, Bastian Matteo (2018). "Rommel Almighty? Italian Assessments of the Desert Fox during and after the Second World War". Journal of Military History. 82 (1): 125–146.
- Schrijvers, Peter (1997). The Crash of Ruin: American Combat Soldiers in Europe during World War II. Springer. ISBN 978-1349145225.
- Searle, Alaric (2014). "Rommel and the rise of the Nazis". In Beckett, I. F. W. (ed.). Rommel Reconsidered. Mechanicsburg, PA: Stackpole Books. ISBN 978-0-8117-1462-4.
- Shirer, William L. (1960). The Rise and Fall of the Third Reich. New York: Simon & Schuster. LCCN 60-6729.
- Showalter, Dennis E. (2006). Patton And Rommel: Men of War in the Twentieth Century (2006 ed.). New York City, New York: Berkley Books. ISBN 978-0-425-20663-8.
- Smelser, Ronald; Davies, Edward J. (2008). The Myth of the Eastern Front: The Nazi-Soviet War in American Popular Culture. New York: Cambridge University Press. ISBN 978-0-521-83365-3.
- Sonnberger, Heike (18 August 2008). "Ausstellung entzaubert "Wüstenfuchs" Rommel". Die Welt. Archived from the original on 17 June 2016.
- Stickler, Matthias (2005). "Generalfeldmarschall Erwin Rommel – Ein Mythos im Zwielicht". In Matthias Stickler; Verena Spinnler (eds.). Portraits zur Geschichte des deutschen Widerstands. Leidorf. pp. 189–208. ISBN 978-3896468383.
- Strawson, John (2013). If By Chance: Military Turning Points that Changed History. Pan Macmillan. p. 124. ISBN 978-1-4472-3553-8.
- Stroud, Rick (2013). The Phantom Army of Alamein: The Men Who Hoodwinked Rommel. A&C Black. ISBN 978-1-4088-3128-1.
- The Cairns Post (9 September 1941). "Gangster goes to war? Hitler's "white hope"". The Cairns Post.
- Time (1951). "Armored Knight". Time. Vol. 57, no. 4.
- Watson, Bruce Allen (1999). Exit Rommel: The Tunisian Campaign, 1942–43. Westport, CN: Praeger Publishers. ISBN 978-0-275-95923-4.
- Watson, Bruce Allen (2006). Exit Rommel: The Tunisian Campaign, 1942–43. Westport, CN: Stackpole Books. ISBN 978-0-8117-3381-6.
- Wette, Wolfram (2007). The Wehrmacht: History, Myth, Reality. Cambridge, MA: Harvard University Press. ISBN 978-0-674-02577-6.
- Young, Desmond (1950). Rommel: The Desert Fox. New York: Harper & Row. OCLC 48067797.
- Zabecki, David T. (2016). "Rethinking Rommel". Military History. 32 (5). Herndon, VA: 24–29. Archived from the original on 11 November 2019.
- Zabecki, David T. (2016a). "David Zabecki's response to Bob Frazier's letter". Readers' Letters. Military History. Archived from the original on 11 May 2020.
- Zaloga, Steven (2013). The Devil's Garden: Rommel's Desperate Defense of Omaha Beach. Stackpole Books. ISBN 978-0-8117-5277-0.
