= Rommel: The Desert Fox =

1950 biography of Erwin Rommel

- First edition
- Author: Desmond Young
- Language: English
- Genre: Biography
- Publisher: William Collins, Sons
- Publication date: 1950
- Publication place: United Kingdom
- Media type: Print

Rommel: The Desert Fox is a 1950 biography of German Field Marshal Erwin Rommel by Desmond Young. The book was the first biography of Rommel and enjoyed immense popularity, especially in Britain. The book led the Western Allies, particularly the British, to depict Rommel as the "good German" and "our friend Rommel", contributing to the formation of the Rommel myth.

== Background ==
Young had served in North Africa in the Indian Army and was once taken prisoner by Rommel's troops. Young extensively interviewed Rommel's widow and collaborated with several individuals who had been close to Rommel, including Hans Speidel, with the support of British journalist and historian Basil Liddell Hart. Speidel, Rommel's former chief of staff, had already written in 1946 that he planned to turn Rommel into "the hero of the German people" and a role model for them. Rommel was a suitable candidate, since his suicide following the failed 20 July plot had led to the assumption that he had opposed Nazism. Young subscribed to this view, subtly conveying that Rommel served the regime but was not part of it.

== Reception ==
The Desert Fox met with enthusiastic reception in Britain, going through eight editions in a year. Following publication, Rommel's former British opponents described Rommel as a brilliant commander and a resistance fighter, with one senior military figure comparing Rommel to legendary commander Belisarius. (The praise led Brian Horrocks, Montgomery's former deputy, to publish an April 1950 article, "The Rommel Myth Debunked", in which he argued that the 8th Army beat Rommel's Afrika Korps "fair and square".)

The book was not without its detractors. A review in Time magazine noted the legendary status Rommel had achieved in his lifetime and quoted another review that described Rommel as "the British army's favorite German general". The Time reviewer concluded that the book was "just this side of hero worship" and, quoting Labour politician Ernest Bevin, alluded to it being an example of the "trade union of generals" in action. Field Marshal Claude Auchinleck wrote a foreword to the book honouring Rommel "as a soldier and a man", and Field Marshal Archibald Wavell included him "among the chosen few, among the very brave, the very true." The reviewer noted Young's obvious admiration for the German generals and remarked that the book may well "have been written by [one]".

Writing in The Daily Telegraph, under the title "Rommel: A Flattering and Unconvincing Portrait", the conservative journalist Malcolm Muggeridge wrote that the 1951 movie based on the book represented "a tendency towards collective schizophrenia whereas (...) 'chivalry' towards a captured brigadier is in no wise incompatible with a foreign policy of perfidy and the brutal disregard for all the elementary decencies of civilised behaviour". Richard Crossman, a Labour MP, objected to the portrayal of Rommel as an anti-Nazi, writing:

As a nation, we deceive ourselves into believing that there are two sorts of Germans—the Good German and the Bad German. The "Bad Germans" are Nazis, militarists, anti-democratic, and perpetrators of atrocities. The "Good Germans" are peace-loving democrats and real gentlemen. Ergo, since Rommel was a clean fighter, he must have been anti-Nazi, and men like him would make good allies of democracy against the Russians.

The historian Hugh Trevor-Roper commented that "the danger now is not that 'our friend Rommel' is becoming not a magician or a bogy-man, but too much of a hero". He pointed out Rommel's early proximity to Hitler and described Rommel as representative of the Wehrmacht officer corps' support for "Hitler's politics and Hitler's war".

== The Desert Fox film ==
The 1951 movie The Desert Fox: The Story of Rommel, based on Young's biography, portrayed Rommel sympathetically, as a loyal, humane soldier and a firm opponent to Hitler's policies. The movie exaggerated Rommel's disputed role in the conspiracy against Hitler, while omitting Rommel's early association with the dictator. Critical and public reception in the US was muted, but the movie was a success in Britain, along with a less-known 1953 movie The Desert Rats, in which Mason reprised his portrayal of Rommel.

Patrick Major argues that the desert war indeed helped effect the former enemies' reconciliation. The British popular history focused on the fighting in that theatre, almost to the exclusion of all others. He states that The Desert Fox had a "catalytic effect" in creating an image of the German military that would be acceptable to the British public. The film received nearly universally positive reviews in Britain, while protests at the cinemas broke out in Vienna and Milan. Liddell Hart watched the movie with a group of high-ranking British officers and reported being "pleasantly surprised". (Note: Patrick Major writes, quoting Liddell Hart: "'went to see it in a very critical frame of mind, from past experience of "Hollywood" handling of history', but 'was pleasantly surprised'.")

== Role in Rommel myth ==
The Rommel myth refers to a view that Rommel was an apolitical, brilliant commander and a victim of Nazi Germany due to his (disputed) participation in the 20 July plot against Adolf Hitler. The myth was created, with Rommel's participation, as a component of Nazi propaganda to praise the Wehrmacht and instill optimism in the German public. Starting in 1941, it was picked up and disseminated in the West by the British press as the Allies sought to explain their apparent inability to defeat the Axis forces in North Africa. British military and political figures contributed to the Rommel myth by embracing the heroic image portrayed by German propaganda as Rommel resumed his offensive in January 1942 against British forces weakened by re-deployments to the Far East. Speaking before Parliament, Winston Churchill addressed the British defeats and described Rommel as an "extraordinary bold and clever opponent" and a "great field commander".

Following the war, the Western Allies, particularly the British, depicted Rommel as the "good German" and "our friend Rommel". His reputation for conducting a clean war was used to advance West German rearmament and the Federal Republic of Germany's reconciliation with Britain and the United States. The Desert Fox and the 1953 publication of The Rommel Papers laid the foundation of the post-war myth.

Young's book was uncritical and laudatory, "bordering on hagiography", according to historian Patrick Major. (Note: Major: "Young had relied extensively on interviews with the Field Marshal's surviving widow, son and former comrades so that the positive picture that emerged is perhaps hardly surprising. Yet the overall effect bordered on hagiography".) (Note: Martin Kitchen: "Early biographies, such as that by Desmond Young, were positively adulatory.") It was another step in the development of the Rommel myth, with Rommel emerging as an active, if not a leading, member of the 20 July plot. Starting in the early 1950s, Speidel contributed as well by highlighting his and Rommel's roles in the plot, thus boosting Speidel's suitability for the Federal Republic's Bundeswehr and NATO.

According to historian Mark Connelly, Young and Liddell Hart laid the foundation for the Anglo-American myth, which consisted of three themes: Rommel's ambivalence towards Nazism; his military genius; and emphasis on the chivalrous nature of the North African Campaign. Their works lent support to the image of the "Clean Wehrmacht" and were generally not questioned, since they came from British authors, rather than German revisionists. (Note: Kitchen: "The North African campaign has usually been seen, as in the title of Rommel's account, as 'War without Hate', and thus as further proof that the German army was not involved in any sordid butchering, which was left to Himmler's SS. While it was perfectly true that the German troops in North Africa fought with great distinction and gallantry, (...) it was fortunate for their subsequent reputation that the SS murderers that followed in their wake did not have an opportunity to get to work." Kitchen further explains that the sparsely populated desert areas did not lend themselves to ethnic cleansing; that the German forces never reached Egypt and Palestine, which had large Jewish populations; and that, in the urban areas of Tunisia and Tripolitania, the Italian government constrained German efforts to discriminate against Italian Jews.)

== Sources ==
- Beckett, Ian (2014). "Introduction". In I. F. W. Beckett (ed.). Rommel Reconsidered. Mechanicsburg, PA: Stackpole Books. ISBN 978-0811714624.
- Caddick-Adams, Peter (2012). Monty and Rommel: Parallel Lives. New York: The Overlook Press. ISBN 978-1590207253.
- Chambers, Madeline (2012). "The Devil's General? German film seeks to debunk Rommel myth". Reuters. OCLC 36119607.
- Citino, Robert (2007). Death of the Wehrmacht: The German Campaigns of 1942. University Press of Kansas. ISBN 978-0700615315.
- Connelly, Mark (2014). "Rommel as icon". In I. F. W. Beckett (ed.). Rommel Reconsidered. Mechanicsburg, PA: Stackpole Books. ISBN 978-0811714624.
- Friedmann, Jan (23 May 2007). "World War II: New Research Taints Image of Desert Fox Rommel". Spiegel Online. OCLC 769589578.
- Hart, Russel A. (2014). "Rommel and the 20th July Bomb Plot". In Beckett, F. W. (ed.). Rommel Reconsidered. Mechanicsburg, PA: Stackpole Books. ISBN 978-0811714624.
- Kitchen, Martin (2009). Rommel's Desert War: Waging World War II in North Africa, 1941–1943. Cambridge University Press. ISBN 978-0521509718.
- Lieb, Peter (2014). "Rommel in Normandy". In I. F. W. Beckett (ed.). Rommel Reconsidered. Mechanicsburg, PA: Stackpole Books. ISBN 978-0811714624.
- Major, Patrick (2008). "'Our Friend Rommel': The Wehrmacht as 'Worthy Enemy' in Postwar British Popular Culture". German History. 26 (4). London: Oxford University Press: 520–535. doi:10.1093/gerhis/ghn049. ISSN 1477-089X.
- Remy, Maurice Philip (2002). Mythos Rommel. Munich: Ullstein. ISBN 3548603858.
- Reuth, Ralf Georg (2005). Rommel: The End of a Legend. London: Haus Books. ISBN 978-1904950202.
- Searle, Alaric (2014). "Rommel and the rise of the Nazis". In I. F. W. Beckett (ed.). Rommel Reconsidered. Mechanicsburg, PA: Stackpole Books. ISBN 978-0811714624.
- Smelser, Ronald; Davies, Edward J. (2008). The Myth of the Eastern Front: The Nazi-Soviet War in American Popular Culture. New York: Cambridge University Press. ISBN 978-0521833653.
- "Armored Knight". Time. Vol. 57, no. 4. New York. 1951. ISSN 0040-781X.
- Watson, Bruce Allen (1999). Exit Rommel: The Tunisian Campaign, 1942–43. Westport, Conn.: Praeger Publishers. ISBN 978-0275959234.
- Wette, Wolfram (2007). The Wehrmacht: History, Myth, Reality. Cambridge, Mass.: Harvard University Press. ISBN 978-0674025776.
- Zabecki, David T. (2016). "Rethinking Rommel". Military History. 32 (5). Herndon, Va.: Empire Press: 24–29. OCLC 60622316.
- Zabecki, David T. (2016b). "March 2016 Readers' Letters". HistoryNet.
