= The Desert Fox: The Story of Rommel =

1951 film by Henry Hathaway

The Desert Fox
- Theatrical poster
- Directed by: Henry Hathaway
- Screenplay by: Nunnally Johnson
- Based on: Rommel: The Desert Fox by Desmond Young
- Produced by: Nunnally Johnson
- Starring: James Mason; Cedric Hardwicke; Jessica Tandy; Luther Adler; Everett Sloane; Leo G. Carroll; George Macready
- Cinematography: Norbert Brodine
- Edited by: James B. Clark
- Music by: Daniele Amfitheatrof
- Color process: Black and white
- Production company: Twentieth Century-Fox
- Distributed by: Twentieth Century-Fox
- Release date: October 17, 1951
- Running time: 88 minutes
- Country: United States
- Language: English
- Box office: $2.4 million (US rentals)

The Desert Fox (released in the United Kingdom as Rommel—Desert Fox) is a 1951 American Twentieth Century-Fox biographical war film directed by Henry Hathaway and starring James Mason in the title role of German field marshal Erwin Rommel in World War II. The script is based on the book Rommel: The Desert Fox by brigadier Desmond Young, who served in the British Indian Army in North Africa. Young portrays himself.

The film played a significant role in the creation of the Rommel myth, which held that Rommel was an apolitical, brilliant commander, opposed Nazi policies and was a victim of the Third Reich because of his participation in the conspiracy to remove Adolf Hitler from power in 1944.

The black-and-white format facilitated the use of large sections of actual documentary footage from World War II throughout the film. Finnish president and field marshal Carl Gustaf Emil Mannerheim's personal Mercedes-Benz 770, a gift received from Hitler, was used as a prop car during the film's shooting.

== Plot ==
In November 1941, a British commando unit raids the headquarters of Field Marshal Erwin Rommel, unaware that the target of their assassination attempt is recovering from nasal diphtheria in Germany. A phone call from Adolf Hitler prompts Rommel's return to the Afrika Korps. The British Eighth Army under General Bernard Montgomery is poised to counterattack the Axis forces in the Second Battle of El Alamein. With inadequate resources and combat power, Rommel is ordered by Hitler to hold fast and fight to the last man. He contemptuously attributes the order to the “clowns“ surrounding Hitler, demands that the order be retransmitted and crumples the repeated order, signaling his intention to disobey.

Rommel again falls ill and is returned to Germany. Family friend Dr. Karl Strölin, lord mayor of Stuttgart, visits him in hospital to request that he join a group of dissidents plotting to overthrow Hitler. Rommel strongly resists and is transferred to Western Europe to oversee completion of the Atlantic Wall, which he realizes will be inadequate to repel an Allied invasion.

When the D-Day landings are successful, Rommel and his superior, Field Marshal Gerd von Rundstedt, are handicapped by Hitler's astrology-based belief that the real invasion will come at Calais. Hitler refuses to release troops and tanks desperately needed in Normandy and again forbids an orderly retreat to establish a strong defense in depth.

Rommel risks broaching the topic of a conspiracy against Hitler with von Rundstedt, who refuses to commit but wishes Rommel success with the plot. Rommel is seriously injured when his staff car is strafed by an Allied plane and he returns home to recuperate. When a bomb explodes at Hitler's feet during a meeting of the general staff at the Wolf's Lair, Hitler survives and thousands suspected of complicity are arrested and executed. Evidence of Rommel's secret participation is gathered, and General Wilhelm Burgdorf charges Rommel with treason. Rommel, a beloved national hero, is given a choice between death by garrote or suicide. The suicide would be publicly attributed in to war wounds, accompanied by the promise that his wife and son would be safe. Rommel bids a stoic farewell to his wife, who promises to explain the choice to their son, and he then climbs into a staff car to meet his fate.

A speech that British prime minister Winston Churchill delivered to the House of Commons in praise of Rommel for his chivalry in battle, tactical genius, and courageous stance against Hitler is heard as a voiceover.

== Cast ==
- James Mason as Field Marshal Erwin Johannes Rommel
- Cedric Hardwicke as Dr. Karl Strölin
- Jessica Tandy as Frau Lucie Rommel
- William Reynolds as Manfred Rommel
- Everett Sloane as General Wilhelm Burgdorf
- Leo G. Carroll as Field Marshal Gerd von Rundstedt
- George Macready as General Fritz Bayerlein
- Richard Boone as Captain Hermann Aldinger
- Eduard Franz as Colonel Claus von Stauffenberg
- Desmond Young as himself
- Michael Rennie Narrator
- Paul Cavanagh as Lt. Col. Caesar von Hofacker (uncredited)
- John Hoyt as Field Marshal Wilhelm Keitel (uncredited)
- Walter Kingsford as Vice Admiral Friedrich Ruge (uncredited)
- John Goldsworthy as General Carl-Heinrich von Stülpnagel (uncredited)

== Production ==
The film was based on a book by British army officer and North African campaign veteran Desmond Young (a lieutenant colonel whose life was spared by Rommel's insistence on strict adherence to military law) that sold approximately 175,000 copies in Britain.

In February 1950, before the book had even been published, it was announced that Nunnally Johnson of Twentieth Century-Fox was leading the negotiations to obtain the film rights to the book. Johnson would write and produce, and Kirk Douglas was the first star mentioned.

Johnson wrote and produced the film as the first part of his new five-year contract with Twentieth Century-Fox. Although he normally took ten weeks to write a script, the script for The Desert Fox took eight months because it was so complex and involved many people who were still alive. He said that while writing the script, the British were generally positive, as Rommel had a very high reputation in the UK, but that there was some controversy in the U.S. about a Hollywood studio producing a sympathetic biography about a German general. Johnson later said, "If Rommel hadn't been involved in the plot against Hitler, this screenplay wouldn't have been written. Circumstances allowed Rommel to be a pretty good fellow because there were no civilians involved in the North Africa campaigns. I have tried to write the script with detachment. There is no effort to solicit sympathy for him, except in the final sequence. There are the circumstances as he says goodbye to his wife and son to go to his death [which] would undoubtedly create sympathy for any man. Rommel was a very limited man intellectually. His problem was a conflict of loyalties. He followed a false god and when he found that out he risked being a traitor."

In January 1951, Henry Hathaway, who had signed to direct, left to shoot second-unit footage in Germany and North Africa. Richard Widmark was discussed as a possible Rommel. However, in February 1951, James Mason signed to play Rommel. Mason, whose career had been on a downward slide since he had moved to the U.S. from Great Britain, lobbied Darryl F. Zanuck to play the role and signed a long-term contract with the studio to appear in one film per year for seven years.

The film was among the first to employ a cold open.

== Reception ==
In a contemporary review for The New York Times, critic Bosley Crowther called The Desert Fox a "strange film" and wrote:

A strange disregard for the principles and the sensibilities of those who suffered and bled in the cause of defeating German aggression in World War II is displayed by Nunnally Johnson and Twentieth Century-Fox in their production of a film about Rommel, the German general, entitled "The Desert Fox." In this enthusiastic tribute to the famous soldier ... there is more than a studious and objective estimation of Rommel and the kind of war he waged, more than a fair degree of credit paid to a tough but gallant foe. There is a determined disposition to show Rommel in a most heroic light and to convey that he, von Rundstedt and certain others were morally on the ''right side."

This curiously ambivalent thesis is supported, so far as the picture is concerned, by no other evidence more impressive than that of Rommel's distrust of Hitler all along and his final reluctant agreement to participate in a plot against Hitler's life—the memorable abortive bomb plot—when he felt that the Fuehrer was leading Germany to doom. In short, Rommel rates the deification that he unstintingly gets in this film, because he eventually turned against Hitler and paid for this treachery with his life.

With apparent disconcern that this thesis fails to take into account that Rommel fought and killed Allies for the Fuehrer so long as he thought that Germany could win, Mr. Johnson and his associates have used all the tricks in the book to portray a military figure of great courage, generosity and humanity. Not only have they got James Mason to play the heroic role, in full knowledge that Mr. Mason is a master of the soulful, "misunderstood" type, but they have larded this portrait of the general with all the recognized attributes of "goodness" on the screen.

Protests were held at cinemas in Vienna and Milan. Basil Liddell Hart, who later edited Rommel's wartime writings into the 1953 book The Rommel Papers, watched the film with other high-ranking British officers and reported being "pleasantly surprised".

== Legacy ==
The film played a significant role in creating the Rommel myth, a view that Rommel was an apolitical, brilliant commander. From 1941, this idea was accepted and disseminated in the West by the British press, seeking to explain the continued inability to defeat the Axis forces in North Africa.

After the war, the Western Allies, and particularly the British, depicted Rommel as the "good German" and "our friend Rommel". His reputation for conducting a clean war was used for the West German rearmament as well as for reconciliation between the former enemies. The Desert Fox helped in creating an image of the German army that would be acceptable to the British public.

The film emphasizes Rommel's role in the conspiracy against Hitler but leaves Rommel's early association with Hitler largely implied. Critical and public reception in the U.S. was muted, but the film was a success in Britain, along with the lesser-known 1953 film The Desert Rats, in which Mason reprised his portrayal of Rommel.
