= Erwin Rommel and the Bundeswehr =

German military historiographic debate

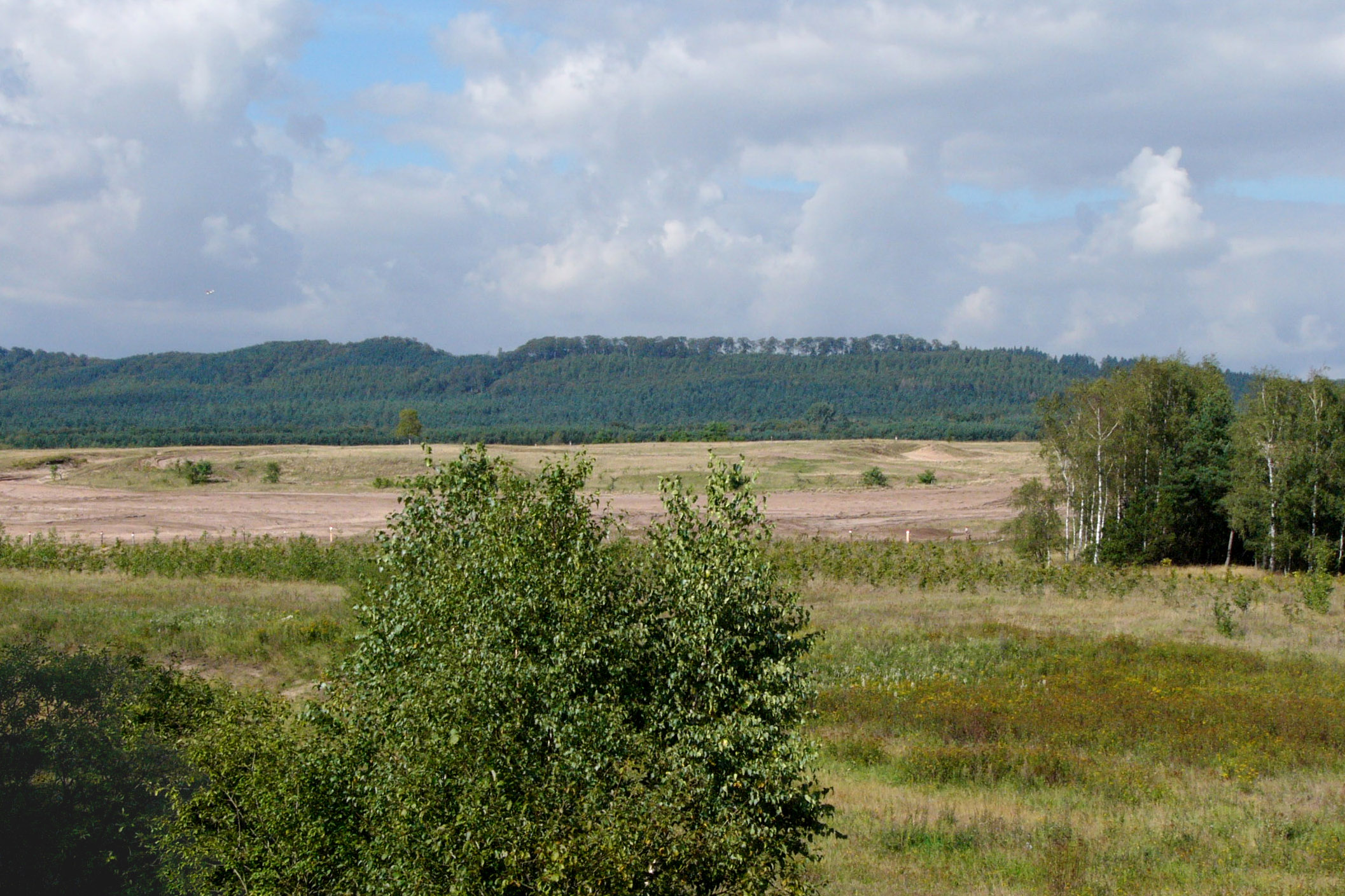
The Field Marshal Rommel Barracks' exercise field with the Teutoburg Forest, usually affiliated with Arminius, in the background. Critics note that the blend of the two figures, represented by the placing of a Rommel portrait and an Arminius statue together in the main building, seems to combine Germanic cults with veneration towards the Wehrmacht.

A significant controversy exists over the German Bundeswehr's use of Field Marshal Erwin Rommel as its role model. Numerous critics take issue with the Bundeswehr's reverence towards Rommel as its primary role model. While recognising his great talents as a commander, they point out several problems, including Rommel's involvement with a criminal regime and his political naivete. However, there are also many supporters of the continued commemoration of Rommel by the Bundeswehr, and there remains military buildings and streets named after him and portraits of him displayed.

== Background ==
During the 1950s, when West German Chancellor Adenauer was forming the new German armed forces, the main contenders for senior leadership were Rommel's former subordinates: Hans Speidel, Hasso von Manteuffel, Gerhard von Schwerin and Geyr von Schweppenburg. Speidel, one of the Bundeswehr's founders and future Commander of the Allied Land Forces Central Europe, was a major defender of Rommel's legacy. In the 1960s, Rommel's image was used effectively to arrange an "elegant settlement" of the conflict between the fascistic "restorers" and the "tradtionalists" led by Wolf Graf von Baudissin (who presided over the creation of the principles of the Innere Fuhrung and was a former subordinate of Rommel).

Rommel has been seen as the embodiment of the knight of the Bundeswehr, which, according to vom Hagen, "was and is" accepted by Germany's NATO partners. When his image was challenged in the late 1990s, three leading generals of the Bundeswehr, namely Edgar Trost, Hartmut Bagger and Helmut Willmann, defended him and named him their personal role model.

== Critics of Rommel's commemoration by the Bundeswehr ==
Political scientists, military officers, and politicians have argued against the invocation of Rommel as a role model or war hero. These arguments mainly rest on the view of Rommel as complicit or not sufficiently opposed to the crimes of Nazi Germany and its wartime army, the Wehrmacht. Others argue that the Bundeswehr should rely on its own legacy for inspiration, or that Rommel's character is incompatible with the Bundeswehr's modern ethos.

Political scientist Ralph Rotte argued Manfred von Richthofen should replace Rommel as the force's role model.

Jürgen Heiducoff, a retired Bundeswehr officer, writes that the maintenance of the Rommel barracks' names and the definition of Rommel as a German resistance fighter are capitulation before neo-Nazi tendencies. He also believes Bundeswehr generals have wrongfully pressured the Federal Ministry of Defence into defending and favouring Rommel's legacy.

The Green Party stated that Rommel, although not a war criminal, had entanglements with war crimes and, therefore, should not be a role model of Germany's armed forces. Similarly, political scientist and politician Alexander Neu argued that Rommel, whatever his personal beliefs, served an unjust regime and was at least a "near-nazi". He criticised the Ministry for labelling Rommel a victim of the regime, particularly without providing a bibliography to support such a conclusion.

Cornelia Hecht opines that whatever judgement history will pass on Rommel–even one as a idol of World War II and a key integration figure of the post-war Republic–the Bundeswehr should rely on its own history and tradition, not a Wehrmacht commander.

Heiducoff agrees with Bundeswehr generals that Rommel was one of the greatest strategists and tacticians, both in theory and practice, and a victim of contemporary jealous colleagues. However, he argues that such a talent for aggressive, destructive warfare is not a suitable model for the Bundeswehr, a primarily defensive army.

== Supporters ==
Those that defend Rommel's continued invocation as a role model or war hero cite his reputation as an embodiment of traditional military virtue, his leadership capability, and the evidence of his passive endorsement of the plot to overthrow the Nazi government.

=== Politicians and historians ===
Parliamentary Commissioner for the Armed Forces and SPD member Hans-Peter Bartels supports the keeping of the name and the tradition associated with Rommel, but not for reasons of his initial successes in the North African campaign (1940-1943), or his post-war admiration by the armies of his former adversaries. In 2019, Barels critiqued efforts to remove Rommel's name from military instillations due to his Nazi affiliation, arguing that Rommel was a "borderline" case whose complicity is hard to ascertain–a common theme among Nazi-era wartime commanders. He argued there is some evidence to suggest he passively supported the 20 July Plot against Hitler and the Nazi government and disregarded some criminal orders.

Historian Michael Wolffsohn supports the continued recognition of Rommel as a model, with more focus on Rommel's later life when he began thinking more seriously about war and politics, and broke with the regime. Mitteldeutscher Rundfunk reports that, "Wolffsohn declares the Bundeswehr wants to have politically thoughtful, responsible officers from the beginning, thus a tradition of 'swashbuckler' and 'humane rogue' is not intended". Similarly, Hannes Heer argues that Rommel's brief association with resistance should be the only element of commemoration, rather than secondary virtues or military capability.

On the other hand, authors such as Ulrich vom Hagen and Sandra Mass believe Rommel is well-suited to be a role model for the Bundeswehr and NATO, forces that deliberately endorse the military and commanding ideal typically associated with Rommel, such as chivalrous warfare, fairness, and apolitical soldiering. Cornelia Hecht argues that these traits are timeless military virtues. Historian Christian Hartmann opines that not only is Rommel's legacy worthy of tradition, but the Bundeswehr "urgently needs to become more [like] Rommel".

Sönke Neitzel supports the commemoration, although he notes that Rommel "rode the waves of the regime" and only mustered the courage to break with it at the last minute, but in a way unlike any other general. He also considers Rommel's other virtues and military capability to be important, since membership of the resistance does not help modern soldiers in Mali.

=== Military officials and institutions ===
In early 2017, the Defence Ministry defended keeping Rommel's name on military installations by arguing the current scholarly research did not support a finding of Rommel as a dedicated Nazi or war criminal, as posted by historian Wolfgang Proske and politicians from the Left Party. Additionally, the Bundeswehr also finds his courage in trying to end the war meaningful and worthy of tradition.

At the Field Marshal Rommel Barracks, Augustdorf, Rommel's leadership and performance are upheld as worthy elements of military tradition and identity. It also posits that Rommel's name should be kept because he has not been proven guilty of a war crime. The Sanitary Regiment 3, stationed at the Rommel Barracks in Dornstadt, also desires (almost unanimously, as revealed by an interdepartmental opinion poll) to keep the name. There has also been discussion regarding the Hammelburg Garrison ("the heart of German infantry", according to Ursula von der Leyen), which considers Rommel as "name patron" and "identification figure" together with Adolf Heusinger (the main street on which the garrison is located is named after Rommel while one of the barracks is named after Heusinger). The local city council has defended the street's name.

At a Ministry conference soliciting input on the matter, Dutch general Ton van Loon advised that although historical abuses may hide under the guise of military tradition, tradition remains essential to the esprit de corps, and that Rommel's leadership and achievements are part of that tradition.

== Alternative views ==
Historian Johannes Hürter opines that instead of being the symbol for an alternative Germany, Rommel should be the symbol for the willingness of the military elites to become instrumentalised by the Nazi authorities. As for whether he can be treated as a military role model, Hürter writes that each soldier can decide on that matter for themselves.

Historian Ernst Piper argues that it is totally conceivable that the resistance saw Rommel as someone with whom they could build a new Germany. According to Piper though, Rommel was a loyal Nazi without crime rather than a democrat, thus unsuitable to hold a central place among role models, although he can be integrated as a major military leader. Wolfgang Benz also comments "His fate gives an idea of the possibilities the military resistance could have offered had such a charismatic leader of troops been at the helm."

== See also ==
- Erwin Rommel in the Second World War
- Field Marshal Rommel Barracks, Augustdorf
- West German rearmament
- Hans Speidel
- Rommel myth
