= Daniel Allen Butler =

American author and playwright

Daniel Allen Butler (born January 24, 1957) is an American author and playwright, who writes on historical topics, particularly maritime history. The Washington Times described him as a "steamship nut".

== Education ==
Butler was educated at Hope College, Grand Valley State University, and the University of Erlangen.

== Publications ==
- Unsinkable: The Full Story of RMS Titanic. Stackpole Books, 1998, ISBN 0-8117-1814-X ISBN 9780811718141. The book was a New York Times bestseller and was described by The Washington Post as "the best narrative" of the Titanic story.
- The Lusitania: The Life, Loss, and Legacy of an Ocean Legend. Stackpole Books, 2000, ISBN 0-8117-0989-2 ISBN 9780811709897
- Warrior Queens: The Queen Mary and Queen Elizabeth in World War II. Stackpole Books, 2002, ISBN 0-8117-1645-7 ISBN 9780811716451
- The Age of Cunard: A Transatlantic History 1839–2003. Lighthouse Press, 2003, ISBN 1-57785-348-2 ISBN 9781577853480
- Distant Victory: The Battle of Jutland and the Allied Triumph in the First World War. Praeger Security International, 2006, ISBN 0-275-99073-7 ISBN 9780275990732
- The First Jihad: The Battle for Khartoum, and the Dawn of Militant Islam. Casemate, 2007, ISBN 978-1-932033-54-0 ISBN 1932033548
- The Other Side of the Night: The Carpathia, the Californian and the Night the Titanic was Lost. Casemate, 2009, ISBN 978-1-935149-02-6 ISBN 1935149024
- The Burden of Guilt: How Germany Shattered the Last Days of Peace, August 1914. Casemate, 2010, ISBN 978-1-935149-27-9 ISBN 193514927X
- Butler, Daniel Allen (2015). Field Marshal: The Life and Death of Erwin Rommel. Havertown, PA; Oxford: Casemate. ISBN 978-1-61200-297-2.
