= Desmond Young (British Army officer) =

Army officer

Desmond Young OBE, MC
- Young in uniform as a brigadier
- Born: 27 December 1891; Port Adelaide, South Australia
- Died: 27 June 1966 (aged 74); Sark, Channel Islands
- Military career
- Allegiance: United Kingdom
- Branch: British Army (1914–c. 1918); British Indian Army (1941– c. 1945)
- Rank: Brigadier
- Commands: 10th Indian Infantry Brigade (1942)
- Conflicts: First World War; Second World War
- Awards: Officer of the Order of the British Empire; Military Cross
- Other work: Writer (including Rommel: The Desert Fox)

Brigadier Desmond Young (27 December 1891 – 27 June 1966) was an Australian-born British Army officer, newspaper publisher and writer. He is known for his laudatory biography of the Nazi German field marshal Erwin Rommel (Rommel: The Desert Fox, 1950), which helped create the Rommel myth.

== Early life and First World War ==
Desmond Young was born in Port Adelaide, South Australia in 1891. His father, Frederick William Young was a marine salvage expert and in his youth Young accompanied him on trips around the world. Young matriculated at the University of Oxford but attended no lectures and was asked to leave. He then travelled to the British Malaya to work as a rubber planter.

On 12 September 1914, shortly after the start of the First World War, Young joined the British Army in the temporary rank of second lieutenant. On 1 October he was promoted to lieutenant in the 9th battalion of the King's Royal Rifle Corps and on 13 February 1915 to captain. Young was wounded while serving in the trenches of the Western Front and, while recovering, missed serving in the Third Battle of Ypres. He passed his time in convalescence writing war poetry. Having returned to the front, on 26 July 1918, at which point he was on the general list of officers, he was awarded the Military Cross, the citation for which reads:

For conspicuous gallantry and devotion to duty. Under heavy fire during an enemy attack he assisted in collecting disorganised troops, and organised them into trenches round brigade headquarters. Through his example and coolness the attack was checked. Later on he took out ammunition under heavy machine-gun fire, and set a fine example.

After the war Young ran the Quadrant nightclub in London, which apparently employed Juliette Compton, and claimed the police forced him to leave the business. He subsequently travelled to the Union of South Africa, where he edited the Natal Witness from 1925 to August 1928, adopting a more conciliatory line towards the two rival segregationist and anti-British Afrikaner political leaders Jan Smuts of the South African Party and J. B. M. Hertzog of the National Party (both of whom he personally met), and edited and published the Cape Times. Young then moved to India to manage the Allahabad Pioneer.

== Second World War ==
During the Second World War Young received an emergency commission as a second lieutenant in the British Indian Army on 12 April 1941. He rose quickly in rank and held command of the 10th Indian Infantry Brigade during Operation Aberdeen, a 5 June 1942 attack ordered by Lieutenant-General Neil Ritchie during the Battle of Gazala. The 10th captured all of their objectives at a thinly-held portion of the German line at Aslagh Ridge but subsequent British attacks on the main defensive line failed. A counter-attack by the German 21st Panzer Division penetrated the British defences in an area of ground known as The Cauldron and disordered part of Young's brigade. A separate attack by the 15th Panzer Division struck a gap in the British minefields south-west of Bir el Harmat and destroyed the headquarters of Young's brigade and that of the 9th Indian Infantry Brigade. The 15th Panzer then trapped the remnants of Young's brigade, alongside other units in The Cauldron, and caused them to surrender. Young was one of 3,100 men captured on 6 June.

In Young's account, he benefitted from Erwin Rommel's personal intervention in captivity when a German officer tried to compel him to order the surrender of a British artillery position. According to his memoirs, Young was transferred to a prisoner-of-war camp in Italy, led the camp's escape committee, and escaped successfully to Switzerland where, by the war's end, he was editing a newspaper for interned British soldiers.

== Later life ==
After the war, Young was appointed director of public relations at the Army's general headquarters in India. He was appointed an officer of the Order of the British Empire on 12 June 1947 for his work in this role. Despite only meeting Rommel once Young was inspired to write a biography of the man. By 1948, he had begun to work with Rommel's widow on the field marshal's records in Herrlingen. Rommel: The Desert Fox was published in London in 1950; it received some criticism for Young's positive description of the man, with Young's Daily News obituary stating Young had portrayed Rommel a "blue-eyed god who could do no wrong". Young's book was adapted by Nunnally Johnson into the 1951 film The Desert Fox: The Story of Rommel, with James Mason in the title role.

Young also wrote Fountain of the Elephants, a 1959 biography of the French adventurer in India Benoît de Boigne. He produced two memoirs, Try Anything Twice and the 1961 work All the Best Years. Young moved to Sark, an island in the English Channel governed by a feudal system, around 1962. He was married with two children and died at his home on Sark on 27 June 1966 aged 74.
