= Ralf Georg Reuth =

German journalist and historian (born 1952)

Ralf Georg Reuth (born 4 June 1952 in Oberfranken) is a German journalist and historian. Reuth studied with Andreas Hillgruber and wrote his Ph.D. on the German strategy in the Mediterranean from 1940 to 1942. He published several books dealing with the Nazi era, among them a biography of Joseph Goebbels in 1992 and of Hitler in 2003. Reuth also edited a multivolume selection from the diaries of Joseph Goebbels, which drew criticism notably from Bernd Sösemann. He also wrote biographies of Erwin Rommel, Angela Merkel and Helmut Kohl.

Reuth's 2004 book Rommel: Das Ende einer Legende, dedicated to the topic of the Rommel myth, has started the reevaluation of Rommel's role in history. The book was published in English in 2005 as Rommel: The End of a Legend.

== Works ==
- Reuth, Ralf Georg (1993). Goebbels. New York: Harcourt Brace & Company. ISBN 0-15-136076-6
- Reuth, Ralf Georg (2005). Rommel: The End of a Legend. London: Haus Books. ISBN 978-1-904950-20-2.
