= Karl Strölin =

German Nazi politician (1890–1963)

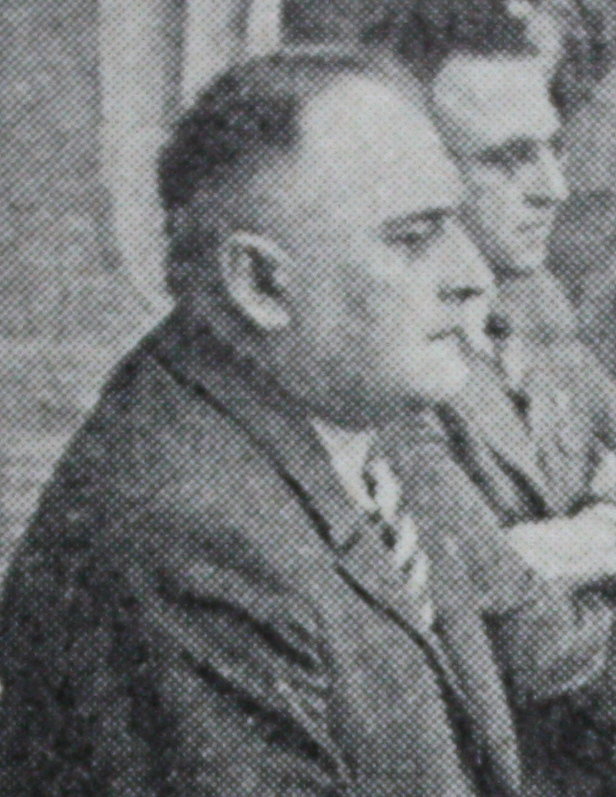
Karl Strölin in 1938

Karl Strölin (21 October 1890 – 21 January 1963) was a German Nazi politician and from 1933 to 1945, was the mayor of Stuttgart.

== Early career ==
Karl Strölin was born in 1890 into a religious family in Berlin, Germany. As the son of an army general, he first pursued a career as an officer and took part in the First World War. In 1920, he was forced to leave the military along with thousands of other officers per the disarmament provisions of the Versailles Treaty. He received his doctorate with a thesis on the situation of workers and the middle class before and after the First World War. In 1923 he joined the newly founded National Socialist German Workers Party (Nazi Party), and after it was banned in the mid-1920s, joined again in 1931.

== Nazi politician ==
In 1931, Strölin stood as the NSDAP candidate in Stuttgart's mayoral election against the incumbent Karl Lautenschlager. Strölin had to accept significant defeat, receiving only 26,000 votes to Lautenschlager's 115,000. Nevertheless, Strölin won in subsequent local elections for Stuttgart City Council and became chairman of the Nazi faction. After the Nazi seizure of power on 30 January 1933, he deposed Lautenschlager and took over the post of lord mayor of Stuttgart. Supported by Wilhelm Murr, Gauleiter of Württemberg, Strölin removed not only mayor Lautenschlager, but also all the SPD deputies from the city council. Within weeks, he also dismissed hundreds of employees in the entire city government and replaced them with Nazi party members.

In 1933, among many other appointments, Strölin became chairman of the Deutsches Ausland-Institut (DAI). This organisation, originally designed in 1917 for the care and documentation of ethnic Germans abroad, became deeply involved in Nazi Volkstum racial policies. During his tenure as mayor, Strölin travelled repeatedly to Berlin to promote his city to those in power. As a result, Stuttgart received the honorary title "City of the Volksdeutsche" from Adolf Hitler. Strölin rose up into the senior leadership of the Nazi Party.

== Second World War ==
Between 1941 and 1945, Strölin was at least partly responsible for the deportation of more than 2,000 Jews from Stuttgart Nordbahnhof to the concentration camps. With few exceptions, all were murdered in the Holocaust. They are commemorated today by a memorial entitled "Zeichen der Erinnerung" (Signs of Memory) on the former goods railway premises.

As the war turned against Germany, Strölin had contact with Leipzig Mayor Carl Friedrich Goerdeler, who was involved in the 20 July plot to assassinate Hitler. Following the failure of the plot, Strölin's home was searched but nothing incriminating was found. Nevertheless, he was discharged from the leadership of the Nazi Party and remained lord mayor of Stuttgart in name only.

In April 1945, as French and American troops were advancing on Stuttgart, Gauleiter Wilhelm Murr called for the city to be defended at all costs. As a former army officer Strölin knew the city could not possibly be defended in its valley location. The city centre had already been heavily damaged by Allied bombing raids, and ground combat would not only destroy the remaining intact buildings and utilities but also kill thousands more inhabitants. Through his personal intervention, he prevented demolition of the bridge over the River Neckar, over which the main water supply lines ran into Stuttgart.

Strölin then secretly contacted the French Army and offered the peaceful surrender of his hometown. When Strölin's contacts with the enemy were discovered, an arrest warrant was issued against him. However, the radio operator who received the transmission refused to pass on the message. Thus not only was Strölin saved from the firing squad, but also the city escaped total destruction.

On 21 April 1945, the French 5th Armoured Division occupied areas of Stuttgart on the left bank of the Neckar largely without a fight. American troops advanced into the districts on the right bank of the Neckar up to Bad Cannstatt. The next day Strölin surrendered the city to a French General and suggested the non-Nazi affiliated and unencumbered lawyer Arnulf Klett as the new mayor.

== Post-war ==
Strölin appeared in front of the International Military Tribunal in Nuremberg as a defense witness on 25 March 1946. Because Strölin was a prominent Nazi, he was imprisoned by the Allies and spent time in an internment camp at Bad Mondorf, Luxembourg. He was later released after denazification and classified as "less incriminated". However, he never expressed regret about his Nazi past. Rather, until his death Strölin saw Nazism as a good political idea in principle which had only been betrayed by Hitler and his entourage. In 1950, he published a book Stuttgart in the Final Stages of the War. In the early 1950s, he obtained a pension before the Court of the City of Stuttgart. In later life he was attacked not only by the left for his political past, but also by far right circles because he "betrayed Germany with his contacts with the resistance".

Strölin was also the author of a lengthy and tightly reasoned pamphlet entitled Verräter oder Patrioten in which he submitted that, although they had pledged allegiance to Hitler, those involved in the 20 July plot were not traitors but patriots.

Strölin is buried at the Waldfriedhof Stuttgart in Stuttgart.

Strolin (played by Sir Cedric Hardwicke) was portrayed as a member of the 20 July plot against Hitler in the 1951 movie 'The Desert Fox'. Erwin Rommel (played by James Mason) is visited in hospital by Strolin who attempts to recruit Rommel to the plot. When Strolin arrives at the Military Hospital, his name is found to be on the 'list' of persons who are subject to surveillance, and is tailed by a Gestapo officer when he leaves. Strolin evades the Gestapo officer at a train station.
