= Patrick Major =

British historian and professor

Patrick N. Major (born 1964, in Surrey) is Professor of History at the University of Reading. Major is a specialist in the history of modern Germany, the World Wars, the Cold War, film history and popular cultural history.

Major spent some time researching in the West German security services. He later discovered that his supervisor in the West German version of MI5 was a former Stasi agent.

== Selected publications ==
- The Death of the KPD: Communism and Anti-Communism in West Germany, 1945-1956.
- The workers' and peasants' state: communism and society in East Germany under Ulbricht, 1945–71. Manchester University Press, Manchester, 2002. (Editor with J. Osmond) ISBN 9780719062896
- "Our friend Rommel: the Wehrmacht as "worthy enemy" in postwar British popular culture", German History, 26 (4), 2008, pp. 520–35.
- Behind the Berlin Wall: East Germany and the Frontiers of Power. Oxford University Press, Oxford, 2009. ISBN 9780199243280
- Spooked: Britain, Empire and Intelligence since 1945. Cambridge Scholars Publishing, Newcastle, 2009. (Edited with C. Moran) ISBN 9781443813129
- "Listening behind the Curtain: BBC broadcasting to East Germany and its Cold War echo", Cold War History, 13 (2), 2012, pp. 255–275.
