= Mark Connelly =

Mark Connelly is an academic historian who was Professor of Modern British History and Head of the School of History, at the University of Kent in Canterbury between 2008 and 2024 where he was both a military historian and the Reuters Lecturer in Media History. Connelly specialises in the 19th Century and First World War.

He is also the author of a book on the Second World War and the British home front called, We Can Take It!, as well as other books and essays.

He took his PhD at Queen Mary & Westfield College.

In December 2007, Connelly appeared on the BBC television show The One Show, commenting on the social history of Christmas in the UK.

== Books ==
- Christmas: A Social History (London, I.B. Tauris, September 1999)
- (Editor) Christmas at the Movies: The Representation of Christmas in American, British and European Cinema (London, I.B. Tauris, October 2000)
- Reaching for the Stars: A New History of Bomber Command in World War II (London, I.B. Tauris, December 2000; 2014)
  - Review, Air and Space Power Journal, Fall 2002 reprint
  - Review. The Journal of Military History, April 2004, v.68, #2
- The Great War: Memory and Ritual (Suffolk, Boydell & Brewer, 2002)
  - Review by Janet Watson Twentieth Century British History 2004 15(4):436-438; doi:10.1093/tcbh/15.4.436)
- British Film Guides: The Charge of the Light Brigade (London, I.B. Tauris, 2003)
- We Can Take It! Britain and the memory of the Second World War (Harlow, Pearson Longman, 2004)
  - Review, ContemporLongmanary Review July 2005.
- (ed. with D. Welch) War and the Media: propaganda and reportage, 1900-2003 (London, I.B. Tauris, 2004)
- British Film Guides: The Red Shoes (London, I.B. Tauris, 2005)
- Steady the Buffs! The East Kent Regiment and the Great War (Oxford, OUP, 2006)
- The Hardy Boys mysteries, 1927-1979 - A Cultural and Literary History (2008)
