= Allemant, Aisne =

Allemant
- Commune
- Location of Allemant
- Location within France Location within Hauts-de-France
- Coordinates: 49°27′42″N 3°27′16″E
- Country: France
- Region: Hauts-de-France
- Department: Aisne
- Arrondissement: Soissons
- Canton: Fère-en-Tardenois
- Intercommunality: Val de l'Aisne

Government
  - Mayor (2026–32): Nicolas Guibert
- Area^{1}: 5.13 km^{2} (1.98 sq mi)
- Elevation: 100 m (330 ft)
- Highest elevation: 171 m (561 ft)
- Lowest elevation: 83 m (272 ft)
- Population (2023): 163
  - Density: 31.8/km^{2} (82.3/sq mi)
- Time zone: UTC+01:00 (CET)
  - Summer (DST): UTC+02:00 (CEST)
- INSEE/Postal code: 02010 /02320
- ^{1} French Land Register data, which excludes lakes, ponds, glaciers > 1 km^{2} (0.386 sq mi or 247 acres) and river estuaries.

Allemant (French pronunciation: [almɑ̃]) is a commune in the department of Aisne in the Hauts-de-France region of northern France.

== Geography ==
Allemant is located some 10 km northeast of Soissons and 15 km southwest of Laon. National Highway N2 from Soissons to Laon passes along its southern border and has exits at both the southwestern and southeastern corners of the commune. On the western side the D26, which exits from the N2, forms part of the western border of the commune and then passes through the western portion of the commune. Nevertheless, there is no connection between this road and the village which must be accessed from the north on the road D143 coming south from its junction with the D14 near Pinon. The exit from the N2 at the southeastern corner leads to the D14 road which does not pass through the commune. There are however a number of country roads leading from this exit into the commune and by which the village can be reached. The commune is covered more or less equally by farmland and forest.

== History ==
On 17 June 1944 a German V-1 flying bomb launched from Vignacourt in the Somme deviated from its path and fell in the territory of the commune at 4.30am. Hitler was visiting his headquarters in Margival - the Wolfsschlucht II, only 3 km away - to discuss the situation on the Normandy front with Marshals Rommel and von Rundstedt but, as a result of the flying bomb deviation, rushed back to Germany and did not go as planned to the La Roche-Guyon headquarters of Rommel. This was his only visit to the fortified headquarters and his last visit to France.

== Population ==
Historical population
Year	Pop.	±% p.a.
1968	137	—
1975	126	−1.19%
1982	128	+0.23%
1990	136	+0.76%
1999	117	−1.66%
2007	171	+4.86%
2012	176	+0.58%
2017	177	+0.11%
2023	163	−1.36%
Source: INSEE

== See also ==
- Communes of the Aisne department
