= Erwin Rommel in the Second World War =

War actions of the German military officer

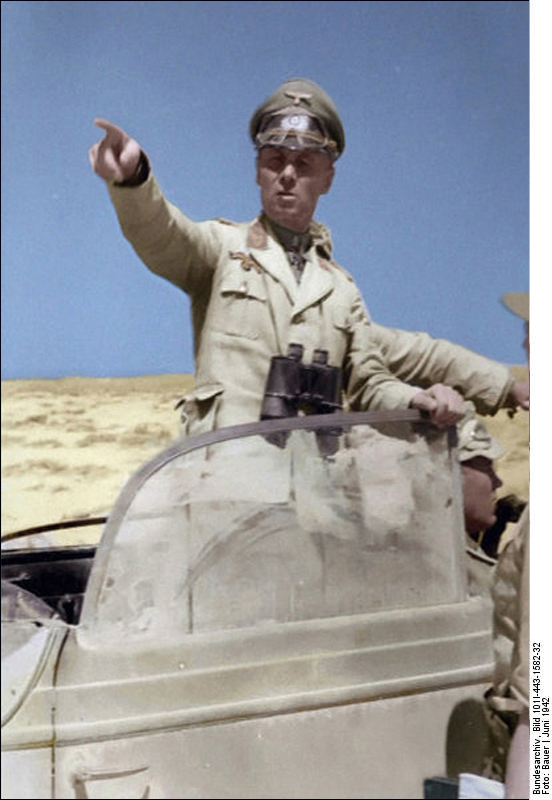
Erwin Rommel, in June 1942. North Africa, near Tobruk.

Erwin Rommel (15 November 1891 – 14 October 1944), known as The Desert Fox was a military officer who had served in the Imperial German Army, the Reichswehr and the German Army of the 1935–1945 period. While his record in World War I was also notable and has recently gained new attention, he is particularly known for his actions in World War II, especially for his role in the campaign in Africa. David Mitchelhill-Green writes that Rommel was "a legend — on both sides — during his own lifetime. Today he remains the most well-known German general of the Second World War." The book West Point History of World War II notes that "Field Marshal Erwin Rommel was the most famous and well-regarded German general during World War II [...]." Kaushik Roy opines that initially, historians hyped up Rommel and the German army, but today, new criticisms have arisen, creating a many-sided picture. Roy writes that the pendulum should not be swung too far, stressing that Rommel was not an ordinary general and he was able to run rings around the Allied forces for two years despite having never enjoyed material superiority in Africa, but gradually the combat effectiveness of the Allies was raised through material superiority as well as innovative doctrines and tactics.

== World War II ==
=== Poland 1939 ===
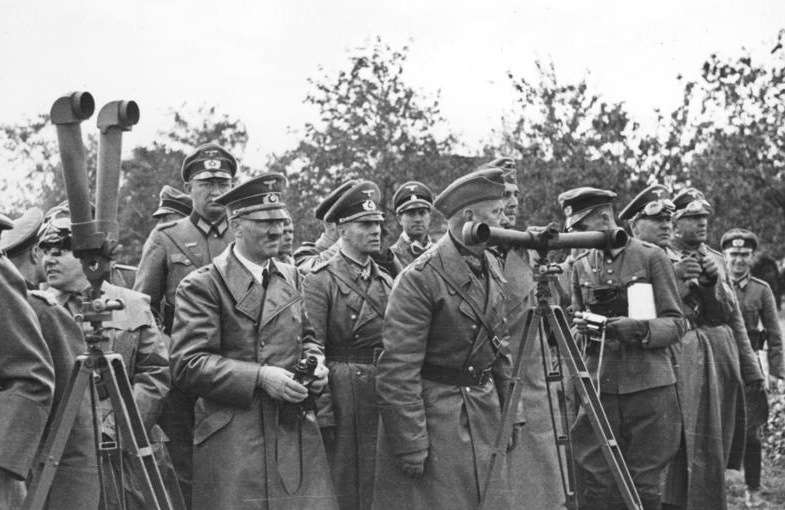
Hitler in Poland (September 1939). Rommel is on his left and Martin Bormann on his right.

Rommel was promoted to Generalmajor on 23 August 1939 and assigned as commander of the Führerbegleitbatallion, tasked with guarding Hitler and his field headquarters during the invasion of Poland, which began on 1 September. According to Remy, Rommel's private letters at this time show that he did not understand Hitler's true nature and intentions, as he quickly went from predicting a swift peaceful settlement of tensions to approving Hitler's reaction ("bombs will be retaliated with bombs") to the Gleiwitz incident (a false flag operation staged by Hitler and used as a pretext for the invasion). Hitler took a personal interest in the campaign, often moving close to the front in the Führersonderzug (headquarters train).

=== France 1940 ===
==== Promotion to armoured division commander ====
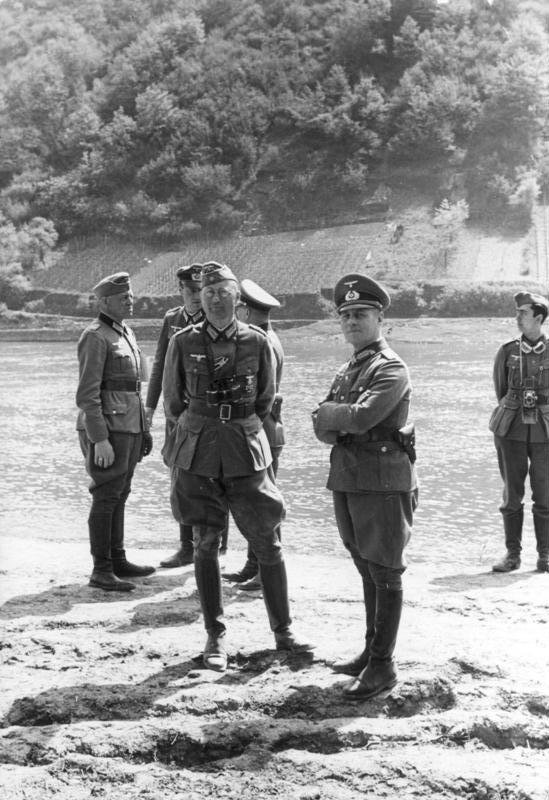
Rommel and his staff observed troops of the 7th Panzer Division conducting river-crossing exercises on the Moselle River in France, 1940.

Rommel, seeking a panzer command after the invasion of Poland, pressed for leadership of one of Germany's ten panzer divisions, drawing on his World War I record of using surprise and manoeuvre—tactics well suited to armored units. Although initially rejected by the army personnel office, which offered him a mountain division instead, he ultimately secured the post with backing from Hitler, Wilhelm List, and likely Heinz Guderian. The 7th Panzer Division, recently reorganized with 218 tanks and supporting infantry, motorcycle, engineer, and anti-tank units, began intensive maneuver training under Rommel after he assumed command on 10 February 1940.

==== Invasion of the Netherlands, Belgium and France ====
The invasion began on 10 May 1940. By the third day Rommel and the advance elements of his division, together with a detachment of the 5th Panzer Division, had reached the Meuse, where they found the bridges had already been destroyed (Guderian and Georg-Hans Reinhardt reached the river on the same day). Rommel was active in the forward areas, directing the efforts to make a crossing, which were initially unsuccessful because of suppressive fire by the French on the other side of the river. Rommel brought up tanks and flak units to provide counter-fire and had nearby houses set on fire to create a smokescreen. He sent infantry across in rubber boats, appropriated the bridging tackle of the 5th Panzer Division, personally grabbed a light machine gun to fight off a French counterattack supported by tanks, and went into the water himself, encouraging the sappers and helping lash together the pontoons. By 16 May Rommel reached Avesnes, and contravening orders, he pressed on to Cateau. That night, the French II Army Corps was shattered and on 17 May, Rommel's forces took 10,000 prisoners, losing 36 men in the process. He was surprised to find out only his vanguard had followed his tempestuous surge. The High Command and Hitler had been extremely nervous about his disappearance, although they awarded him the Knight's Cross. Rommel's (and Guderian's) successes and the new possibilities offered by the new tank arm were welcomed by a small number of generals, but worried and paralysed the rest.

On 20 May, Rommel reached Arras. General Hermann Hoth received orders that the town should be bypassed and its British garrison thus isolated. He ordered the 5th Panzer Division to move to the west and the 7th Panzer Division to the east, flanked by the SS Division Totenkopf. The following day, the British launched a counterattack in the Battle of Arras. It failed and the British withdrew.

On 24 May, Generaloberst (Colonel General) Gerd von Rundstedt and Generaloberst Günther von Kluge issued a halt order, which Hitler approved. The reason for this decision is still a matter of debate. The halt order was lifted on 26 May. 7th Panzer continued its advance, reaching Lille on 27 May. The Siege of Lille continued until 31 May, when the French garrison of 40,000 men surrendered. Rommel was summoned to Berlin to meet with Hitler. He was the only divisional commander present at the planning session for Fall Rot (Case Red), the second phase of the invasion of France. By this time the Dunkirk evacuation was complete; over 338,000 Allied troops had been evacuated across the Channel, though they had to leave behind all their heavy equipment and vehicles.

==== Drive for the Channel ====
Rommel, resuming his advance on 5 June, drove for the River Seine to secure the bridges near Rouen. Advancing 100 kilometres (60 mi) in two days, the division reached Rouen to find it defended by three French tanks which managed to destroy a number of German tanks before being taken out. The German force, enraged by this resistance, forbade fire brigades access to the burning district of the old Norman capital, and as a result, most of the historic quarter was reduced to ashes. According to David Fraser, Rommel instructed the German artillery to bombard the city as a "fire demonstration". According to one witness report, the smoke from burning Rouen was intense enough that it reached Paris. Daniel Allen Butler states that the bridges to the city were already destroyed. After the fall of the city, both black civilians and colonial troops were summarily executed on 9 June by unknown German units. The number of black civilians and prisoners killed is estimated at 100. According to Butler and Showalter, Rouen fell to the 5th Panzer Division, while Rommel advanced from the Seine towards the Channel. On 10 June, Rommel reached the coast near Dieppe, sending Hoth the message "Bin an der Küste" ("Am on the coast"). On 17 June, 7th Panzer was ordered to advance on Cherbourg, where additional British evacuations were under way. The division advanced 240 km (150 mi) in 24 hours, and after two days of shelling, the French garrison surrendered on 19 June. The speed and surprise that it was consistently able to achieve, to the point at which both the enemy and the Oberkommando des Heeres (OKH; German "High Command of the Army") at times lost track of its whereabouts, earned the 7th Panzers the nickname Gespensterdivision ("ghost division").

After the armistice with the French was signed on 22 June, the division was placed in reserve, being sent first to the Somme and then to Bordeaux to re-equip and prepare for Unternehmen Seelöwe (Operation Sea Lion), the planned invasion of Britain. This invasion was later cancelled, as Germany was not able to acquire the air superiority needed for a successful outcome, while the Kriegsmarine was massively outnumbered by the Royal Navy.

=== North Africa 1941–1943 ===
Western Desert battle area

On 6 February 1941, Rommel was appointed commander of the new Afrika Korps (Deutsches Afrika Korps; DAK), consisting of the 5th Light Division (later renamed 21st Panzer Division) and of the 15th Panzer Division. He was promoted to Generalleutnant three days later and flew to Tripoli on 12 February. The DAK had been sent to Libya in Operation Sonnenblume to support Italian troops who had been roundly defeated by British Commonwealth forces in Operation Compass. (Note: The Italian army had been pushed back out of Cyrenaica and nearly 140,000 troops captured) His efforts in the Western Desert Campaign earned Rommel the nickname the "Desert Fox" from journalists on both sides of the war. (Note: It is not known exactly who coined the name first, as Desert Fox (in Britain) and Wüstenfuchs (in Germany) seemingly came into use at the same time.) Allied troops in Africa were commanded by General Archibald Wavell, Commander-in-Chief, Middle East Command.

==== First Axis offensive ====
Rommel and his troops were technically subordinate to Italian commander-in-chief General Italo Gariboldi. Disagreeing with the orders of the Oberkommando der Wehrmacht (OKW, German armed forces high command) to assume a defensive posture along the front line at Sirte, Rommel resorted to subterfuge and insubordination to take the war to the British. According to Remy, the General Staff tried to slow him down but Hitler encouraged him to advance—an expression of the conflict that had existed between Hitler and the army leadership since the invasion of Poland. He decided to launch a limited offensive on 24 March with the 5th Light Division, supported by two Italian divisions. This thrust was not anticipated by the British, who had Ultra intelligence showing that Rommel had orders to remain on the defensive until at least May when the 15th Panzer Division were due to arrive.

The British Western Desert Force had meanwhile been weakened by the transfer in mid-February of three divisions for the Battle of Greece. They fell back to Mersa El Brega and started constructing defensive works. After a day of fierce fighting on 31 March, the Germans captured Mersa El Brega. Splitting his force into three groups, Rommel resumed the advance on 3 April. Benghazi fell that night as the British pulled out of the city. Gariboldi, who had ordered Rommel to stay in Mersa El Brega, was furious. Rommel was equally forceful in his response, telling Gariboldi, "One cannot permit unique opportunities to slip by for the sake of trifles." A signal arrived from General Franz Halder reminding Rommel that he was to halt in Mersa El Brega. Knowing Gariboldi could not speak German, Rommel told him the message gave him complete freedom of action. Gariboldi backed down. Throughout the campaign, fuel supply was problematic, as no petrol was available locally; it had to be brought from Europe by tanker and then carried by road to where it was needed. Food and fresh water were also in short supply, and it was difficult to move tanks and other equipment off-road through the sand. Cyrenaica was captured by 8 April, except for the port city of Tobruk, which was besieged on 11 April.

==== Siege of Tobruk ====
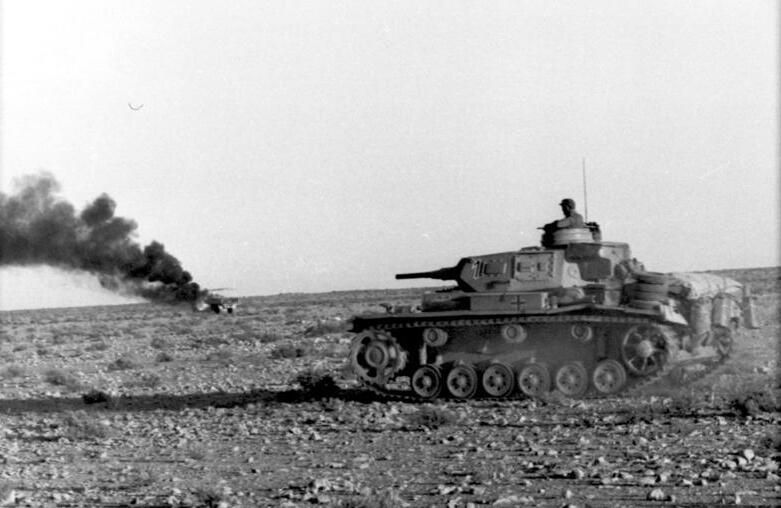
Afrika Korps Panzer III drives past a vehicle burning in the desert, April 1941

The siege of Tobruk was not technically a siege, as the defenders were still able to move supplies and reinforcements into the city via the port. Rommel knew that by capturing the port he could greatly reduce the length of his supply lines and increase his overall port capacity, which was insufficient even for day-to-day operations and only half that needed for offensive operations. The city, which had been heavily fortified by the Italians during their 30-year occupation, was garrisoned by 36,000 Commonwealth troops, commanded by Australian lieutenant general Leslie Morshead. Hoping to catch the defenders off-guard, Rommel launched a failed attack on 14 April.

Map of Halfaya Pass and surrounding area

Rommel requested reinforcements, but the OKW, then completing preparations for Operation Barbarossa, refused. General Friedrich Paulus, head of the Operations Branch of the OKH, arrived on 25 April to review the situation. He was present for a second failed attack on the city on 30 April. On 4 May, Paulus ordered that no further attempts should be made to take Tobruk via a direct assault. Following a failed counter-attack in Operation Brevity in May, Wavell launched Operation Battleaxe on 15 June; this attack was also defeated. The defeat resulted in Churchill replacing Wavell with General Claude Auchinleck as theatre commander.

In August, Rommel was appointed commander of the newly created Panzer Army Africa, with Fritz Bayerlein as his chief of staff. The Afrika Korps, comprising the 15th Panzer Division and the 5th Light Division, now reinforced and redesignated 21st Panzer Division, was put under command of Generalleutnant Ludwig Crüwell. In addition to the Afrika Korps, Rommel's Panzer Group had the 90th Light Division and four Italian divisions, three infantry divisions investing Tobruk, and one holding Bardia. The two Italian armoured divisions, formed into the Italian XX Motorized Corps under the command of General Gastone Gambara, were under Italian control. Two months later Hitler decided he must have German officers in better control of the Mediterranean theatre, and appointed Field Marshal Albert Kesselring as Commander in Chief, South. Kesselring was ordered to get control of the air and sea between Africa and Italy.

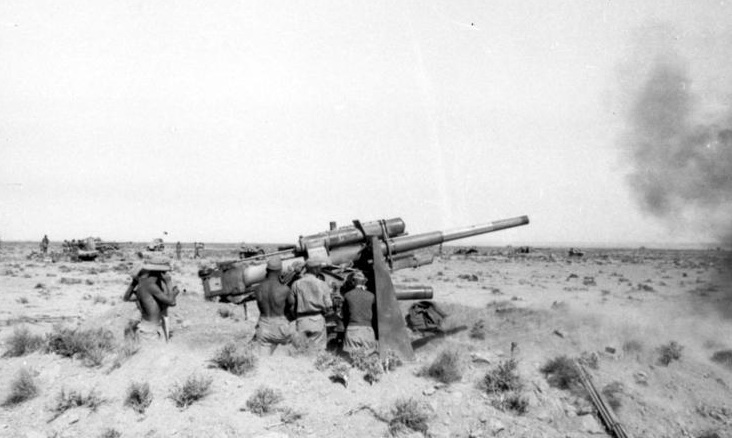
Near Bir Hachiem 8.8cm Flak 18 guns firing. Rommel's vehicle in the background

Following his success in Battleaxe, Rommel returned his attention to the capture of Tobruk. He made preparations for a new offensive, to be launched between 15 and 20 November. Meanwhile, Auchinleck reorganised Allied forces and strengthened them to two corps, XXX and XIII, which formed the British Eighth Army. It was placed under the command of Alan Cunningham. Auchinleck launched Operation Crusader, a major offensive to relieve Tobruk, on 18 November 1941. Rommel reluctantly decided on 20 November to call off his planned attack on Tobruk.

In four days of heavy fighting, the Eighth Army lost 530 tanks and Rommel only 100. Wanting to exploit the British halt and their apparent disorganisation, on 24 November Rommel counterattacked near the Egyptian border in an operation that became known as the "dash to the wire". Cunningham asked Auchinleck for permission to withdraw into Egypt, but Auchinleck refused and soon replaced Cunningham as commander of the Eighth Army with Major General Neil Ritchie. The German counterattack stalled as it outran its supplies and met stiffening resistance, and was criticised by the German High Command and some of Rommel's staff officers.

While Rommel drove into Egypt, the remaining Commonwealth forces east of Tobruk threatened the weak Axis lines there. Unable to reach Rommel for several days, Rommel's Chief of Staff, Siegfried Westphal, ordered the 21st Panzer Division to withdraw to support the siege of Tobruk. On 27 November, the British attack on Tobruk linked up with the defenders, and Rommel, having suffered losses that could not easily be replaced, had to concentrate on regrouping the divisions that had attacked into Egypt. By 7 December, Rommel fell back to a defensive line at Gazala, just west of Tobruk, all the while under heavy attack from the Desert Air Force. The Allies kept up the pressure, and Rommel was forced to retreat all the way back to the starting positions he had held in March, reaching El Agheila in December 1941. The British had retaken almost all of Cyrenaica, but Rommel's retreat dramatically shortened his supply lines.

==== Battle of Gazala and capture of Tobruk ====
On 5 January 1942, the Afrika Korps received 55 tanks and new supplies and Rommel started planning a counterattack, which he launched on 21 January. Caught by surprise, the Allies lost over 110 tanks and other heavy equipment. The Axis forces retook Benghazi on 29 January and Timimi on 3 February, with the Allies pulling back to a defensive line just before the Tobruk area south of the coastal town of Gazala. Between December 1941 and June 1942, Rommel had excellent information about the disposition and intentions of the Commonwealth forces. Bonner Fellers, US military attaché in Egypt, was sending detailed reports to the US State Department using a compromised code.

Following Kesselring's successes in creating local air superiority around the British naval and air bases at Malta in April 1942, an increased flow of supplies reached the Axis forces in Africa. With his forces strengthened, Rommel contemplated a major offensive operation for the end of May. He knew the British were planning offensive operations as well, and he hoped to pre-empt them. Early in the afternoon of 26 May 1942, Rommel attacked first and the Battle of Gazala commenced. Under the cover of darkness, the bulk of Rommel's motorised and armoured forces drove south to skirt the left flank of the British, coming up behind them and attacking to the north the following morning.

On 30 May, Rommel resumed the offensive, and on 1 June, Rommel accepted the surrender of some 3,000 Commonwealth soldiers. On 6 June, Rommel's forces assaulted the Free French strongpoint in the Battle of Bir Hakeim, but the defenders continued to thwart the attack until finally evacuating on 10 June. Rommel then shifted his attack north; threatened with being completely cut off, the British began a retreat eastward toward Egypt on 14 June, the so-called "Gazala Gallop".

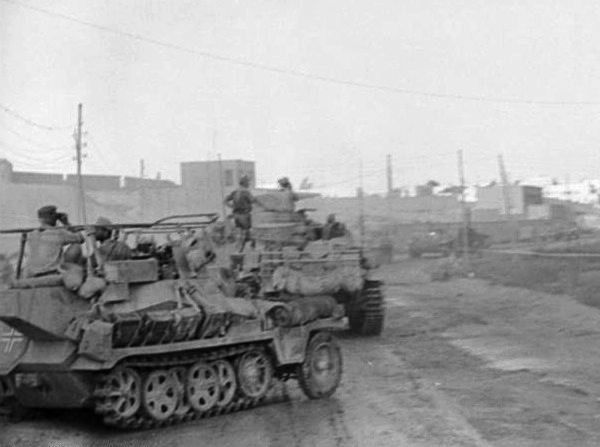
Rommel in his command vehicle follows a Panzer in Tobruk.

The assault on Tobruk proper began at dawn on 20 June, and the British surrendered at dawn the following day. Rommel's forces captured 32,000 Commonwealth troops, the port, and huge quantities of supplies. Only at the fall of Singapore, earlier that year, had more British Commonwealth troops been captured at one time. On 22 June, Hitler promoted Rommel to Generalfeldmarschall for this victory. Following his success at Gazala and Tobruk, Rommel wanted to seize the moment and not allow the 8th Army a chance to regroup. He strongly argued that the Panzerarmee should advance into Egypt and drive on to Alexandria and the Suez Canal, as this would place almost all the Mediterranean coastline in Axis hands and, according to Rommel, potentially lead to the capture from the south of the oil fields in the Caucasus and Middle East.

Rommel's success at Tobruk worked against him, as Hitler no longer felt it was necessary to proceed with Operation Herkules, the proposed attack on Malta. Auchinleck relieved Ritchie of command of the Eighth Army on 25 June, and temporarily took command himself. Rommel knew that delay would only benefit the British, who continued to receive supplies at a faster rate than Rommel could hope to achieve. He pressed an attack on the heavily fortified town of Mersa Matruh, which Auchinleck had designated as the fall-back position, surrounding it on 28 June. The fortress fell to the Germans on 29 June. In addition to stockpiles of fuel and other supplies, the British abandoned hundreds of tanks and trucks. Those that were functional were put into service by the Panzerarmee which by now relied on British trucks for half its transport.

==== El Alamein ====
===== First Battle of El Alamein =====
El Alamein and surrounding area

Rommel continued his pursuit of the Eighth Army, which had fallen back to heavily prepared defensive positions at El Alamein. This region is a natural choke point, where the Qattara Depression creates a relatively short line to defend that could not be outflanked to the south because of the steep escarpment. During this time Germans prepared numerous propaganda postcards and leaflets for the Egyptian and Syrian populations urging them to "chase English out of the cities", warning them about "Jewish peril" and with one leaflet printed in 296,000 copies and aimed at Syria stating among others

Because Marshal Rommel, at the head of the brave Axis troops, is already rattling the last gates of England's power! Arabs! Help your friends achieve their goal: abolishing the English-Jewish-American tyranny!

On 1 July, the First Battle of El Alamein began. Rommel had around 100 available tanks. The Allies were able to achieve local air superiority, with heavy bombers attacking the 15th and 21st Panzers, who had also been delayed by a sandstorm. The 90th Light Division veered off course and were pinned down by South African artillery fire. Rommel continued to attempt to advance for two more days, but repeated sorties by the Desert Air Force meant he could make no progress. On 3 July, he wrote in his diary that his strength had "faded away". Attacks by 21st Panzer on 13 and 14 July were repulsed, and an Australian attack on 16–17 July was held off with difficulty. Throughout the first half of July, Auchinleck concentrated attacks on the Italian 60th Infantry Division Sabratha at Tel el Eisa. The ridge was captured by the 26th Australian Brigade on 16 July. Both sides suffered similar losses throughout the month, but the Axis supply situation remained less favourable. Rommel realised that the tide was turning. A break in the action took place at the end of July as both sides rested and regrouped.

Preparing for a renewed drive, the British replaced Auchinleck with General Harold Alexander on 8 August. Bernard Montgomery was made the new commander of the Eighth Army that same day. The Eighth Army had initially been assigned to General William Gott, but he was killed when his plane was shot down on 7 August. Rommel knew that a British convoy carrying over 100,000 tons of supplies was due to arrive in September. He decided to launch an attack at the end of August with the 15th and 21st Panzer Division, 90th Light Division, and the Italian XX Motorized Corps in a drive through the southern flank of the El Alamein lines. Expecting an attack sooner rather than later, Montgomery fortified the Alam el Halfa ridge with the 44th Division, and positioned the 7th Armoured Division about 25 kilometres (15 mi) to the south.

===== Battle of Alam El Halfa =====
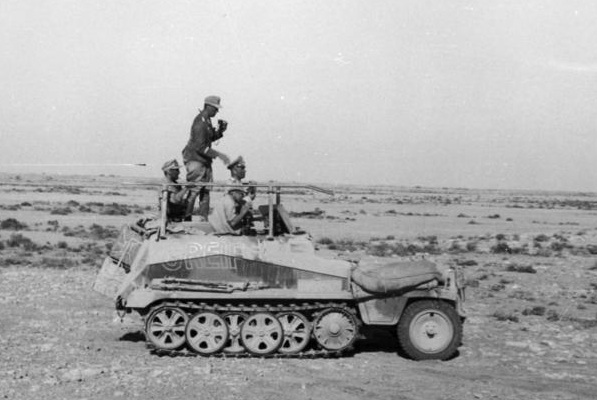
Rommel in a Sd.Kfz. 250/3

The Battle of Alam el Halfa was launched on 30 August. The terrain left Rommel with no choice but to follow a similar tactic as he had at previous battles: the bulk of the forces attempted to sweep around from the south while secondary attacks were launched on the remainder of the front. It took much longer than anticipated to get through the minefields in the southern sector, and the tanks got bogged down in unexpected patches of quicksand (Montgomery had arranged for Rommel to acquire a falsified map of the terrain). Under heavy fire from British artillery and aircraft, and in the face of well-prepared positions that Rommel could not hope to outflank for lack of fuel, the attack stalled. By 2 September, Rommel realised the battle was unwinnable, and decided to withdraw.

On the night of 3 September, the 2nd New Zealand Division and 7th Armoured Division positioned to the north engaged in an assault, but they were repelled in a fierce rearguard action by the 90th Light Division. Montgomery called off further action to preserve his strength and allow for further desert training for his forces. In the attack, Rommel had suffered 2,940 casualties and lost 50 tanks, a similar number of guns, and 400 lorries, vital for supplies and movement. The British losses, except tank losses of 68, were much less, further adding to the numerical inferiority of Panzer Army Africa. The Desert Air Force inflicted the highest proportions of damage on Rommel's forces. He now realised the war in Africa could not be won. Physically exhausted and suffering from a liver infection and low blood pressure, Rommel flew home to Germany to recover his health. General Georg Stumme was left in command in Rommel's absence.

===== Second Battle of El Alamein =====
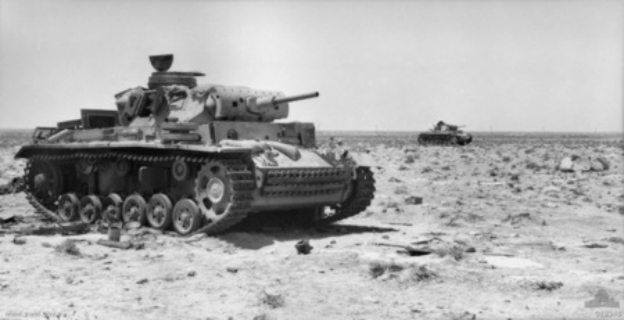
Destroyed Panzer IIIs at Tel el Eisa, near El Alamein (1942)

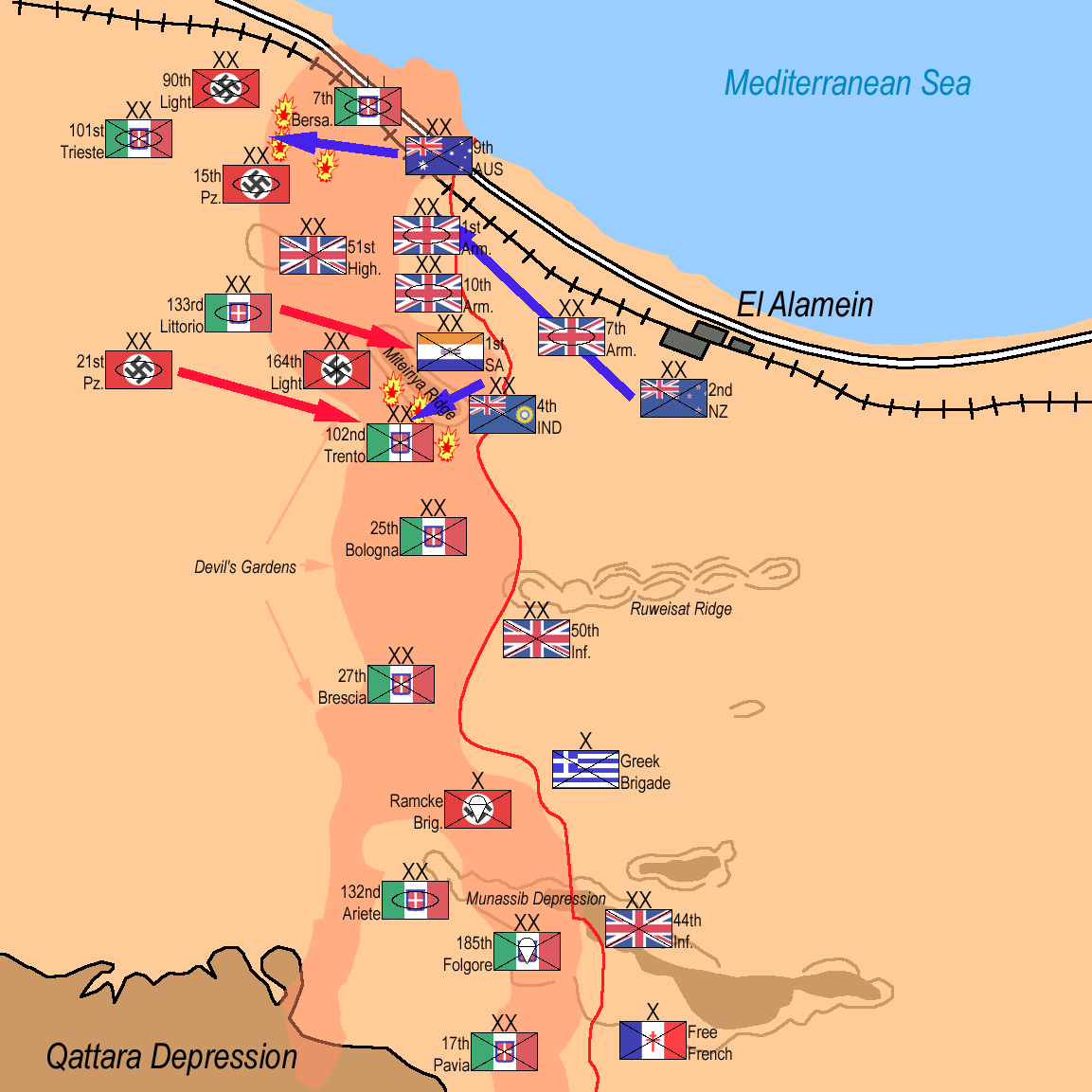
Second Battle of El Alamein. Situation on 28 October 1942

Improved decoding by British intelligence (see Ultra) meant that the Allies had advance knowledge of virtually every Mediterranean convoy, and only 30 per cent of shipments were getting through. In addition, Mussolini diverted supplies intended for the front to his garrison at Tripoli and refused to release any additional troops to Rommel. The increasing Allied air superiority and lack of fuel meant Rommel was forced to take a more defensive posture than he would have liked for the second Battle of El Alamein. The German defences to the west of the town included a minefield eight kilometres (five miles) deep with the main defensive line—itself several thousand yards deep—to its west. This, Rommel hoped, would allow his infantry to hold the line at any point until motorised and armoured units in reserve could move up and counterattack any Allied breaches. The British offensive began on 23 October. Stumme, in command in Rommel's absence, died of an apparent heart attack while examining the front on 24 October, and Rommel was ordered to return from his medical leave, arriving on the 25th. Montgomery's intention was to clear a narrow path through the minefield at the northern part of the defences, at the area called Kidney Ridge, with a feint to the south. By the end of 25 October, the 15th Panzer, the defenders in this sector, had only 31 serviceable tanks remaining of their initial force of 119. Rommel brought the 21st Panzer and Ariete Divisions north on 26 October, to bolster the sector. On 28 October, Montgomery shifted his focus to the coast, ordering his 1st and 10th Armoured Divisions to attempt to swing around and cut off Rommel's line of retreat. Meanwhile, Rommel concentrated his attack on the Allied salient at Kidney Ridge, inflicting heavy losses. However, Rommel had only 150 operational tanks remaining, and Montgomery had 800, many of them Shermans.

Montgomery, seeing his armoured brigades losing tanks at an alarming rate, stopped major attacks until the early hours of 2 November, when he opened Operation Supercharge, with a massive artillery barrage. Due to heavy losses in tanks, towards the end of the day, Rommel ordered his forces to disengage and begin to withdraw. At midnight, he informed the OKW of his decision, and received a reply directly from Hitler the following afternoon: he ordered Rommel and his troops to hold their position to the last man. Rommel, who believed that the lives of his soldiers should never be squandered needlessly, was stunned. Rommel initially complied with the order, but after discussions with Kesselring and others, he issued orders for a retreat on 4 November. The delay proved costly in terms of his ability to get his forces out of Egypt. He later said the decision to delay was what he most regretted from his time in Africa. Meanwhile, the British 1st and 7th Armoured Division had broken through the German defences and were preparing to swing north and surround the Axis forces. On the evening of the 4th, Rommel finally received word from Hitler authorising the withdrawal.

==== End of Africa campaign ====
As Rommel attempted to withdraw his forces before the British could cut off his retreat, he fought a series of delaying actions. Heavy rains slowed movements and grounded the Desert Air Force, which aided the withdrawal, yet Rommel's troops were under pressure from the pursuing Eighth Army and had to abandon the trucks of the Italian forces, leaving them behind. Rommel continued to retreat west, aiming for 'Gabes gap' in Tunisia. Kesselring strongly criticised Rommel's decision to retreat all the way to Tunisia, as each airfield the Germans abandoned extended the range of the Allied bombers and fighters. Rommel defended his decision, pointing out that if he tried to assume a defensive position the Allies would destroy his forces and take the airfields anyway; the retreat saved the lives of his remaining men and shortened his supply lines. By now, Rommel's remaining forces fought in reduced-strength combat groups, whereas the Allied forces had great numerical superiority and control of the air. On his arrival in Tunisia, Rommel noted with some bitterness the reinforcements, including the 10th Panzer Division, arriving in Tunisia following the Allied invasion of Morocco.

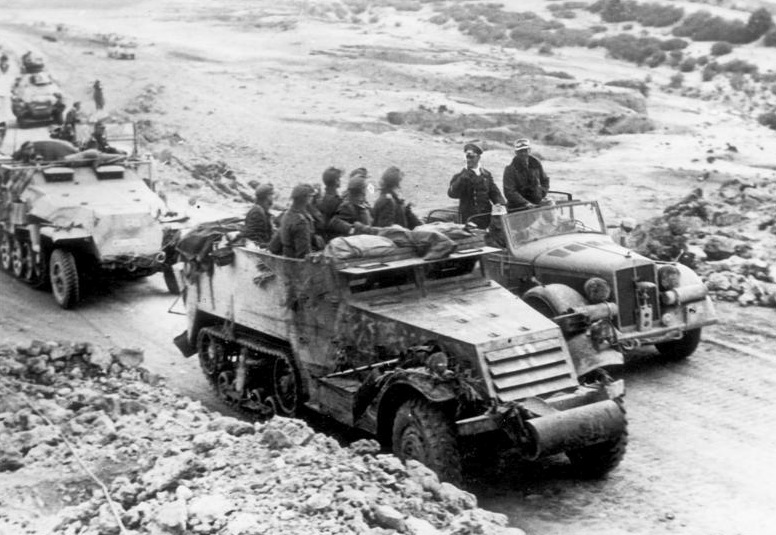
Rommel speaks with troops who are using a captured American M3 half-track, Tunisia.

Having reached Tunisia, Rommel launched an attack against the U.S. II Corps which was threatening to cut his lines of supply north to Tunis. Rommel inflicted a sharp defeat on the American forces at the Kasserine Pass in February, his last battlefield victory of the war, and his first engagement against the United States Army.

Rommel immediately turned back against the British forces, occupying the Mareth Line (old French defences on the Libyan border). While Rommel was at Kasserine at the end of January 1943, the Italian General Giovanni Messe was appointed commander of Panzer Army Africa, renamed the Italo-German Panzer Army in recognition of the fact that it consisted of one German and three Italian corps. Though Messe replaced Rommel, he diplomatically deferred to him, and the two coexisted in what was theoretically the same command. On 23 February Army Group Afrika was created with Rommel in command. It included the Italo-German Panzer Army under Messe (renamed 1st Italian Army) and the German 5th Panzer Army in the north of Tunisia under General Hans-Jürgen von Arnim.

The last Rommel offensive in North Africa was on 6 March 1943, when he attacked the Eighth Army at the Battle of Medenine. The attack was made with 10th, 15th, and 21st Panzer Divisions. Alerted by Ultra intercepts, Montgomery deployed large numbers of anti-tank guns in the path of the offensive. After losing 52 tanks, Rommel called off the assault. On 9 March he returned to Germany. Command was handed over to General Hans-Jürgen von Arnim. Rommel never returned to Africa. The fighting there continued for another two months, until 13 May 1943, when Messe surrendered the army group to the Allies.

=== Italy 1943 ===
On 23 July 1943, Rommel was moved to Greece as commander of Army Group E to counter a possible British invasion. He arrived in Greece on 25 July but was recalled to Berlin the same day following Mussolini's dismissal from office. This caused the German High Command to review the defensive integrity of the Mediterranean and it was decided that Rommel should be posted to Italy as commander of the newly formed Army Group B. On 16 August 1943, Rommel's headquarters moved to Lake Garda in northern Italy and he formally assumed command of the group, consisting of the 44th Infantry Division, the 26th Panzer Division and the 1st SS Panzer Division Leibstandarte SS Adolf Hitler. When Italy announced its armistice with the Allies (Armistice of Cassibile) on 8 September, Rommel's group took part in Operation Achse, disarming the Italian forces.

Hitler met with Rommel and Kesselring on 30 September 1943 to discuss future operations in Italy. Rommel insisted on a defensive line north of Rome, while Kesselring was more optimistic and advocated holding a line south of Rome. Hitler preferred Kesselring's recommendation, and therefore revoked his previous decision for the subordination of Kesselring's forces to Rommel's army group. On 19 October, Hitler decided that Kesselring would be the overall commander of the forces in Italy, sidelining Rommel.

Rommel had wrongly predicted that the collapse of the German line in Italy would be fast. On 21 November, Hitler gave Kesselring overall command of the Italian theatre, moving Rommel and Army Group B to Normandy in France with responsibility for defending the French coast (Atlantic Wall) against the long-anticipated Western Allied invasion.

=== Atlantic Wall 1944 ===
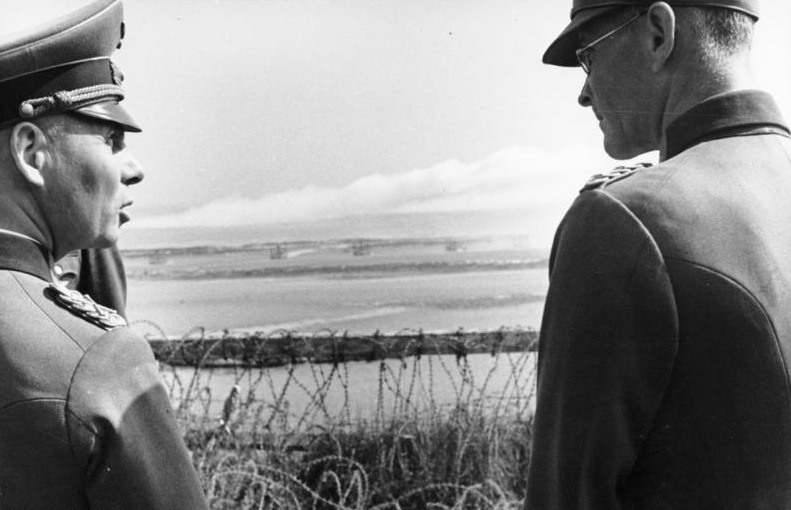
Rommel observes the fall of shot at Riva-Bella, just north of Caen in the area that would become Sword Beach in Normandy.

On 4 November 1943, Rommel became General Inspector of the Western Defences. He was given a staff that befitted an army group commander, and the powers to travel, examine and make suggestions on how to improve the defences. Hitler, who was having a disagreement with him over military matters, intended to use Rommel as a psychological trump card.

There was broad disagreement in the German High Command as to how best to meet the expected Allied invasion of Northern France. The Commander-in-Chief West, Gerd von Rundstedt, believed there was no way to stop the invasion near the beaches because of the Allied navies' firepower, as had been experienced at Salerno. He argued that the German armour should be held in reserve well inland near Paris, where they could be used to counter-attack in force in a more traditional military doctrine. The allies could be allowed to extend themselves deep into France, where a battle for control would be fought, allowing the Germans to envelop the allied forces in a pincer movement, cutting off their avenue of retreat. He feared the piecemeal commitment of their armoured forces would cause them to become caught in a battle of attrition which they could not hope to win.

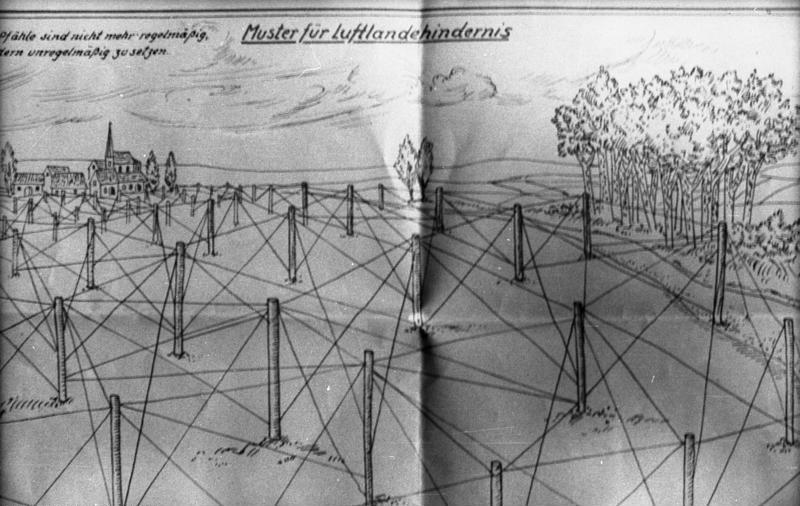
A sketch by Rommel. His words on the picture: "Patterns for anti-airlanding obstacles. Now to be spaced irregularly instead of regularly". The House of Local History of Baden-Württemberg now keeps several of these, some hand-coloured by Rommel himself.

The notion of holding the armour inland to use as a mobile reserve force from which they could mount a powerful counterattack applied the classic use of armoured formations as seen in France in 1940. These tactics were still effective on the Eastern Front, where control of the air was important but did not dominate the action. Rommel's own experiences at the end of the North African campaign revealed to him that the Germans would not be able to preserve their armour from air attack for this type of mass assault. Rommel believed their only opportunity would be to oppose the landings directly at the beaches, and to counterattack there before the invaders could become well-established. Though there had been some defensive positions established and gun emplacements made, the Atlantic Wall was a token defensive line. Rundstedt had confided to Rommel that it was for propaganda purposes only.

Upon arriving in Northern France, Rommel was dismayed by the lack of completed works. According to Ruge, Rommel was in a staff position and could not issue orders, but he made every effort to explain his plan to commanders down to the platoon level, who took up his words eagerly, but "more or less open" opposition from the above slowed down the process. Rundstedt intervened and supported Rommel's request for being made a commander. It was granted on 15 January 1944.

He and his staff set out to improve the fortifications along the Atlantic Wall with great energy and engineering skill. (Note: Lieb: Of course, Rommel did not conceive all these devices himself ...) (Note: Earle Rice, historian and senior design engineer in aerospace and nuclear industries: he would add all manner of ingenious obstacles and impedance devices to the anticipated landing areas. But ... shortages of concrete and other materials and insufficient time prevented him from completing the Atlantic Wall to his satisfaction.) (Note: Zaloga, historian and military technology expert: Rommel and his headquarters developed a variety of obstacles to interfere with landing craft. This was Rommel's single most important contribution to the defence of the Normandy coast ... Rommel's pet project, the coastal obstacles, had proven to be one of the most successful innovations in the German defences.) This was a compromise: Rommel now commanded the 7th and 15th armies; he also had authority over a 20-kilometre-wide strip of coastal land between Zuiderzee and the mouth of the Loire. The chain of command was convoluted: the air force and navy had their own chiefs, as did the South and Southwest France and the Panzer group; Rommel also needed Hitler's permission to use the tank divisions. Rommel had millions of mines laid and thousands of tank traps and obstacles set up on the beaches and throughout the countryside, including in fields suitable for glider aircraft landings, the so-called Rommel's asparagus (the Allies would later counter these with Hobart's Funnies). In April 1944, Rommel promised Hitler that the preparations would be complete by 1 May, a promise he failed to deliver. By the time of the Allied invasion, the preparations were far from finished. The quality of some of the troops manning them was poor and many bunkers lacked sufficient stocks of ammunition.

Rundstedt expected the Allies to invade in the Pas-de-Calais because it was the shortest crossing point from Britain, its port facilities were essential to supplying a large invasion force, and the distance from Calais to Germany was relatively short. Rommel and Hitler's views on the matter are a matter of debate between authors, with both seeming to change their positions.

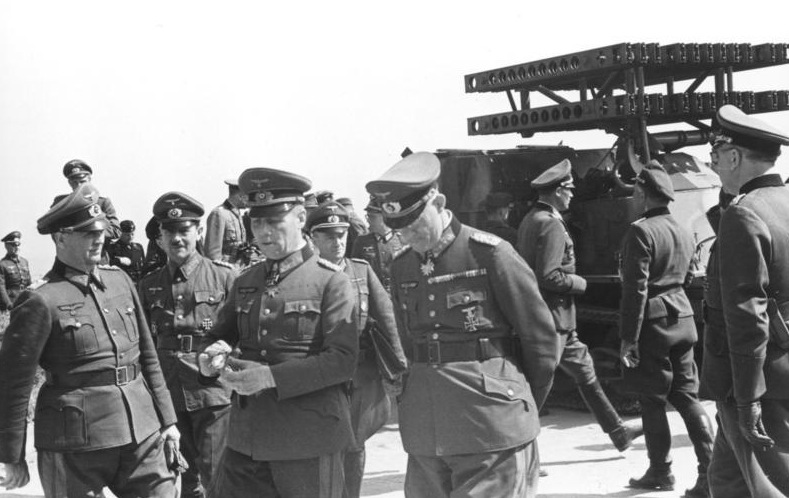
Inspecting 21st Panzer Division troops and a mule track carrier of the Nebelwerfer

Hitler vacillated between the two strategies. In late April, he ordered the I SS Panzer Corps placed near Paris, far enough inland to be useless to Rommel, but not far enough for Rundstedt. Rommel moved those armoured formations under his command as far forward as possible, ordering General Erich Marcks, commanding the 84th Corps defending the Normandy section, to move his reserves into the frontline. Rundstedt was willing to delegate a majority of the responsibilities to Rommel (the central reserve was Rundstedt's idea but he did not oppose some form of coastal defence), Rommel's strategy of an armour-supported coastal defence line was opposed by some officers, most notably Leo Geyr von Schweppenburg, who was supported by Guderian. Hitler compromised and gave Rommel three divisions (the 2nd, the 21st and the 116th Panzer), let Rundstedt retain four and turned the other three to Army Group G, pleasing no one.

The Allies staged elaborate deceptions for D-Day (see Operation Fortitude), giving the impression that the landings would be at Calais. Although Hitler himself expected a Normandy invasion for a while, Rommel and most Army commanders in France believed there would be two invasions, with the main invasion coming at the Pas-de-Calais. Rommel drove defensive preparations all along the coast of Northern France, particularly concentrating on fortification building in the River Somme estuary. By D-Day on 6 June 1944 nearly all the German staff officers, including Hitler's staff, believed that Pas-de-Calais was going to be the main invasion site, and continued to believe so even after the landings in Normandy had occurred.

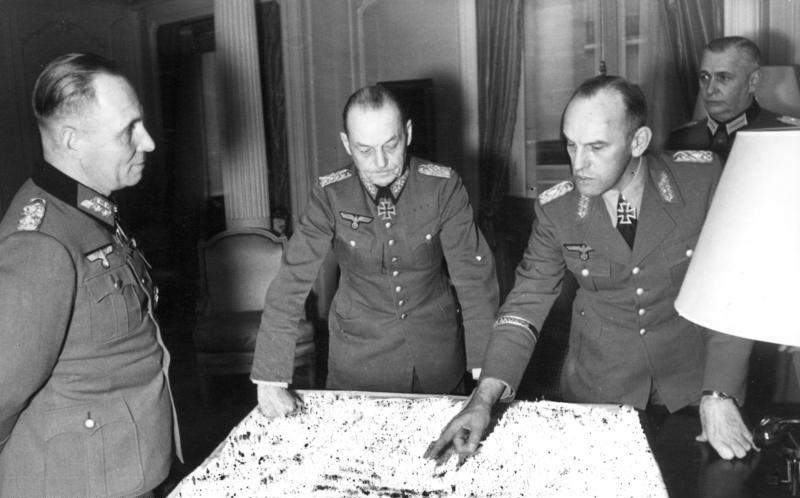
Generalfeldmarschälle Gerd von Rundstedt and Erwin Rommel meeting in Paris

The 5 June storm in the channel seemed to make a landing very unlikely, and a number of the senior officers left their units for training exercises and various other efforts. On 4 June the chief meteorologist of the 3 Air Fleet reported that weather in the channel was so poor there could be no landing attempted for two weeks. Rommel left France on 5 June, and on the next day he was at home celebrating his wife's 50th birthday. He was recalled and returned to his headquarters at 10 pm. Meanwhile, earlier in the day, Rundstedt had requested the reserves be transferred to his command. At 10 am Keitel advised that Hitler declined to release the reserves but that Rundstedt could move the 12th SS Panzer Division Hitlerjugend closer to the coast, with the Panzer-Lehr-Division placed on standby. Later in the day, Rundstedt received authorisation to move additional units in preparation for a counterattack, which Rundstedt decided to launch on 7 June. Upon arrival, Rommel concurred with the plan. By nightfall, Rundstedt, Rommel and Speidel continued to believe that the Normandy landing might have been a diversionary attack, as the Allied deception measures still pointed towards Calais. The 7 June counterattack did not take place because Allied air bombardments prevented the 12th SS's timely arrival. All this made the German command structure in France in disarray during the opening hours of the D-Day invasion.

The Allies secured five beachheads by nightfall of 6 June, landing 155,000 troops. The Allies pushed ashore and expanded their beachhead despite strong German resistance. Rommel believed that if his armies pulled out of range of Allied naval fire, it would give them a chance to regroup and re-engage them later with a better chance of success. While he managed to convince Rundstedt, they still needed to win over Hitler. At a meeting with Hitler at his Wolfsschlucht II headquarters in Margival in northern France on 17 June, Rommel warned Hitler about the inevitable collapse in the German defences but was rebuffed and told to focus on military operations.

By mid-July the German position was crumbling. On 17 July 1944, as Rommel was returning from visiting the headquarters of the I SS Panzer Corps, a fighter plane piloted by either Charley Fox of 412 Squadron RCAF, Jacques Remlinger of No. 602 Squadron RAF, or Johannes Jacobus le Roux of No. 602 Squadron RAF strafed his staff car near Sainte-Foy-de-Montgommery. The driver sped up and attempted to get off the main roadway, but a 20 mm round shattered his left arm, causing the vehicle to veer off the road and crash into trees. Rommel was thrown from the car, suffering injuries to the left side of his face from glass shards and three fractures to his skull. He was hospitalised with major head injuries (assumed to be almost certainly fatal).

=== Plot against Hitler ===
The role that Rommel played in the military's resistance against Hitler or the 20 July plot is difficult to ascertain as most of the leaders who were directly involved did not survive, and limited documentation exists on the conspirators' plans and preparations. One piece of evidence that points to the possibility that Rommel came to support the assassination plan was General Eberbach's confession to his son (eavesdropped on by British agencies) while in British captivity which stated that Rommel explicitly said to him that Hitler and his close associates had to be killed because this would be the only way out for Germany. This conversation occurred about a month before Rommel was coerced into suicide.

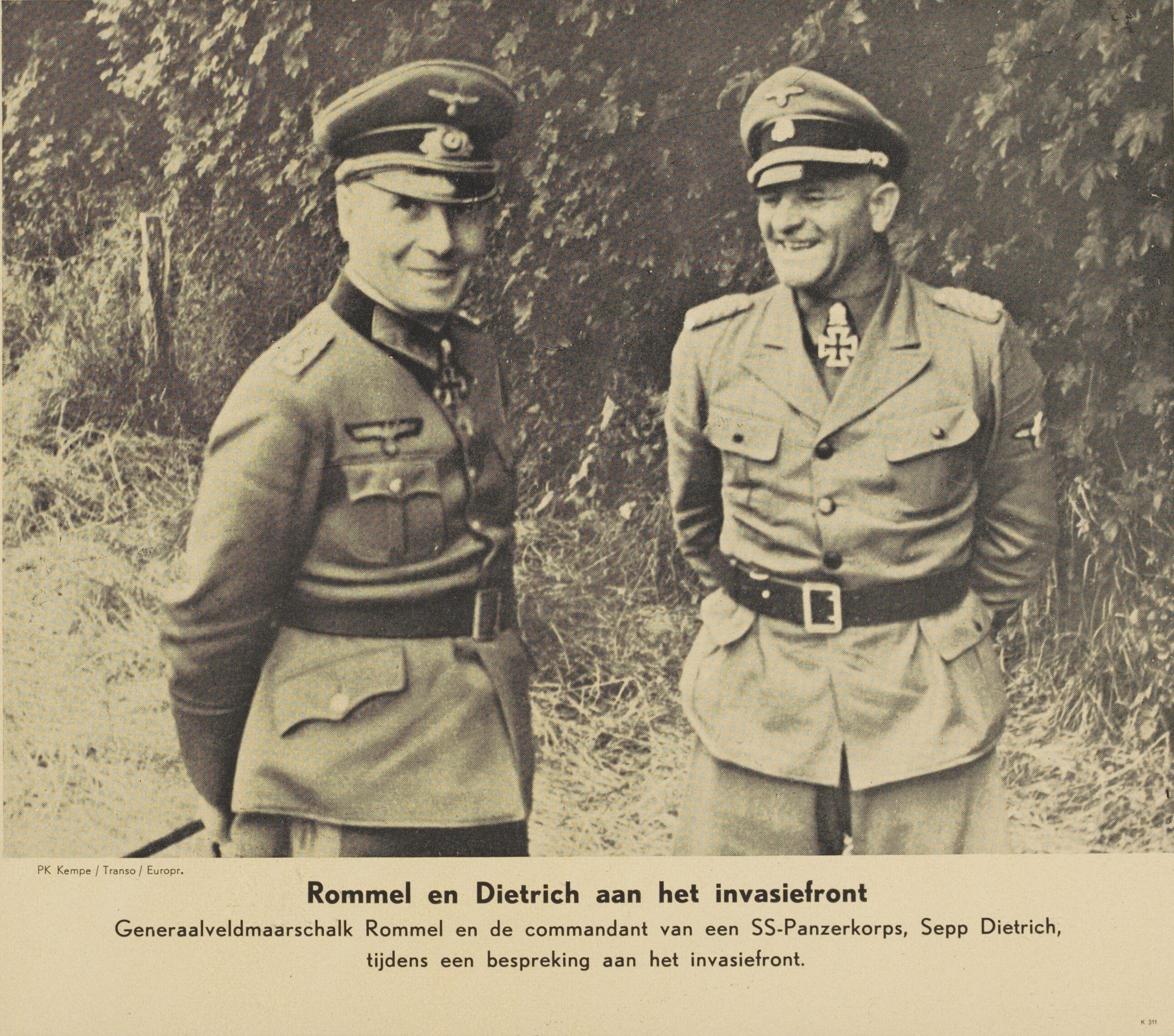
Rommel and Dietrich on 1944. Dietrich was noted as one of the generals Rommel contacted for his plan for the Western front.

Other notable evidence includes the papers of Rudolf Hartmann (who survived the later purge) and Carl-Heinrich von Stülpnagel, who were among the leaders of the military resistance (alongside Rommel's chief of staff General Hans Speidel, Colonel Karl-Richard Koßmann, Colonel Eberhard Finckh and Lieutenant Colonel Caesar von Hofacker). These papers, accidentally discovered by historian Christian Schweizer in 2018 while doing research on Rudolf Hartmann, include Hartmann's eyewitness account of a conversation between Rommel and Stülpnagel in May 1944, as well as photos of the mid-May 1944 meeting between the inner circle of the resistance and Rommel at Koßmann's house. According to Hartmann, by the end of May, in another meeting at Hartmann's quarters in Mareil–Marly, Rommel showed "decisive determination" and clear approval of the inner circle's plan. In a post-war account by Karl Strölin, three of Rommel's friends—the Oberbürgermeister of Stuttgart, Strölin (who had served with Rommel in the First World War), Alexander von Falkenhausen and Stülpnagel—began efforts to bring Rommel into the anti-Hitler conspiracy in early 1944. According to Strölin, sometime in February, Rommel agreed to lend his support to the resistance.

On 15 April 1944, Rommel's new chief of staff, Hans Speidel, arrived in Normandy and reintroduced Rommel to Stülpnagel. Speidel had previously been connected to Carl Goerdeler, the civilian leader of the resistance, but not to the plotters led by Claus von Stauffenberg, and came to Stauffenberg's attention only upon his appointment to Rommel's headquarters. The conspirators felt they needed the support of a field marshal on active duty. Erwin von Witzleben, who would have become commander-in-chief of the Wehrmacht had the plot succeeded, was a field marshal, but had been inactive since 1942. The conspirators gave instructions to Speidel to bring Rommel into their circle. Speidel met with former foreign minister Konstantin von Neurath and Strölin on 27 May in Germany, ostensibly at Rommel's request, although the latter was not present. Neurath and Strölin suggested opening immediate surrender negotiations in the West, and, according to Speidel, Rommel agreed to further discussions and preparations. Around the same timeframe, the plotters in Berlin were not aware that Rommel had allegedly decided to take part in the conspiracy. On 16 May, they informed Allen Dulles, through whom they hoped to negotiate with the Western Allies, that Rommel could not be counted on for support.

At least initially, Rommel opposed assassinating Hitler. According to some authors, he gradually changed his attitude. After the war, his widow—among others—maintained that Rommel believed an assassination attempt would spark a civil war in Germany and Austria, and Hitler would have become a martyr for a lasting cause. Instead, Rommel reportedly suggested that Hitler be arrested and brought to trial for his crimes; he did not attempt to implement this plan when Hitler visited Margival, France, on 17 June. The arrest plan would have been highly improbable as Hitler's security was extremely tight. Rommel would have known this, having commanded Hitler's army protection detail in 1939. He was in favour of peace negotiations and repeatedly urged Hitler to negotiate with the Allies which is dubbed by some as "hopelessly naive" considering no one would trust Hitler. "As naive as it was idealistic, the attitude he showed to the man he had sworn loyalty."

According to Reuth, the reason Lucie Rommel did not want her husband to be associated with any conspiracy was that even after the war, the German population neither grasped nor wanted to comprehend the reality of the genocide, thus conspirators were still treated as traitors and outcasts. On the other hand, the resistance depended on the reputation of Rommel to win over the population. Some officers who had worked with Rommel also recognised the relationship between Rommel and the resistance: Westphal said that Rommel did not want any more senseless sacrifices. Butler, using Ruge's recollections, reports that when told by Hitler himself that "no one will make peace with me," Rommel told Hitler that if he was the obstacle to peace, he should resign or kill himself, but Hitler insisted on fanatical defence.

Reuth, based on Jodl's testimony, reports that Rommel forcefully presented the situation and asked for political solutions from Hitler, who rebuffed that Rommel should leave politics to him. Brighton comments that Rommel seemed devoted, even though he did not have much faith in Hitler anymore considering he kept informing Hitler in person and by letter about his changing beliefs despite facing a military dilemma as well as a personal struggle. Lieb remarks that Rommel's attitude in describing the situation honestly and requiring political solutions was almost without precedent and contrary to the attitude of many other generals. Remy comments that Rommel put himself and his family (which he had briefly considered evacuating to France, but refrained from doing so) at risk for the resistance out of a combination of his concern for the fate of Germany, his indignation at atrocities and the influence of people around him.

On 15 July, Rommel wrote a letter to Hitler giving him a "last chance" to end the hostilities with the Western Allies, urging Hitler to "draw the proper conclusions without delay." What Rommel did not know was that the letter took two weeks to reach Hitler because of Kluge's precautions. Various authors report that many German generals in Normandy, including some SS officers like Hausser, Bittrich, Dietrich (a hard-core Nazi and Hitler's long-time supporter) and Rommel's former opponent Geyr von Schweppenburg, pledged support to him even against Hitler's orders, while Kluge supported him with much hesitation. Rundstedt encouraged Rommel to carry out his plans but refused to do anything himself, remarking that it had to be a man who was still young and loved by the people, while Erich von Manstein was also approached by Rommel but categorically refused, although he did not report them to Hitler either. Peter Hoffmann reports that he also attracted into his orbit officials who had previously refused to support the conspiracy, like Julius Dorpmüller and Karl Kaufmann (according to Russell A. Hart, reliable details of the conversations are now lost, although they certainly met).

On 17 July 1944, Rommel was incapacitated by an Allied air attack, which many authors describe as a fateful event that drastically altered the outcome of the bomb plot. Writer Ernst Jünger commented: "The blow that felled Rommel ... robbed the plan of the shoulders that were to be entrusted the double weight of war and civil war—the only man who had enough naivety to counter the simple terror that those he was about to go against possessed." After the failed bomb attack of 20 July, many conspirators were arrested and the dragnet expanded to thousands. Rommel was first implicated when Stülpnagel, after his suicide attempt, repeatedly muttered "Rommel" in delirium. Under torture, Hofacker named Rommel as one of the participants. Additionally, Goerdeler had written down Rommel's name on a list as potential Reich President (according to Stroelin. They had not managed to announce this intention to Rommel yet and he probably never heard of it until the end of his life).

On 27 September, Martin Bormann submitted to Hitler a memorandum which claimed that "the late General Stülpnagel, Colonel Hofacker, Kluge's nephew who has been executed, Lieutenant Colonel Rathgens, and several ... living defendants have testified that Field Marshal Rommel was perfectly in the picture about the assassination plan and has promised to be at the disposal of the New Government." Gestapo agents were sent to Rommel's house in Ulm and placed him under surveillance. Historian Peter Lieb considers the memorandum, as well as Eberbach's conversation and the testimonies of surviving resistance members (including Hartmann), to be the three key sources that indicate Rommel's support of the assassination plan. He further notes that while Speidel had an interest in promoting his own post-war career, his testimonies should not be dismissed, considering his bravery as an early resistance figure. Remy writes that even more important than Rommel's attitude to the assassination is the fact Rommel had his own plan to end the war. He began to contemplate this plan some months after El Alamein and carried it out with a lonely decision and conviction, and in the end, had managed to bring military leaders in the West to his side.

== Death ==
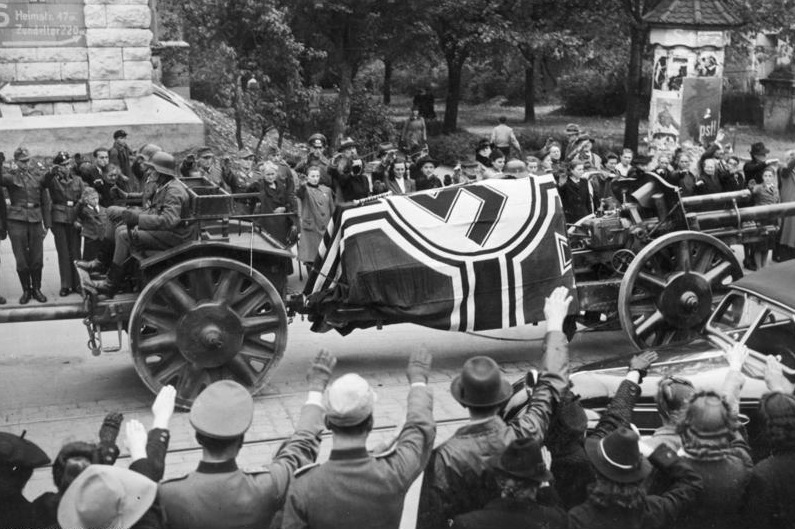
Rommel's funeral procession

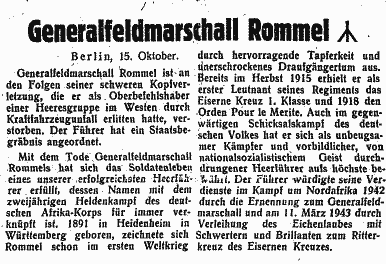
The official announcement of Erwin Rommel's death by the Nazi newspaper Bozner Tagblatt, 16 October 1944

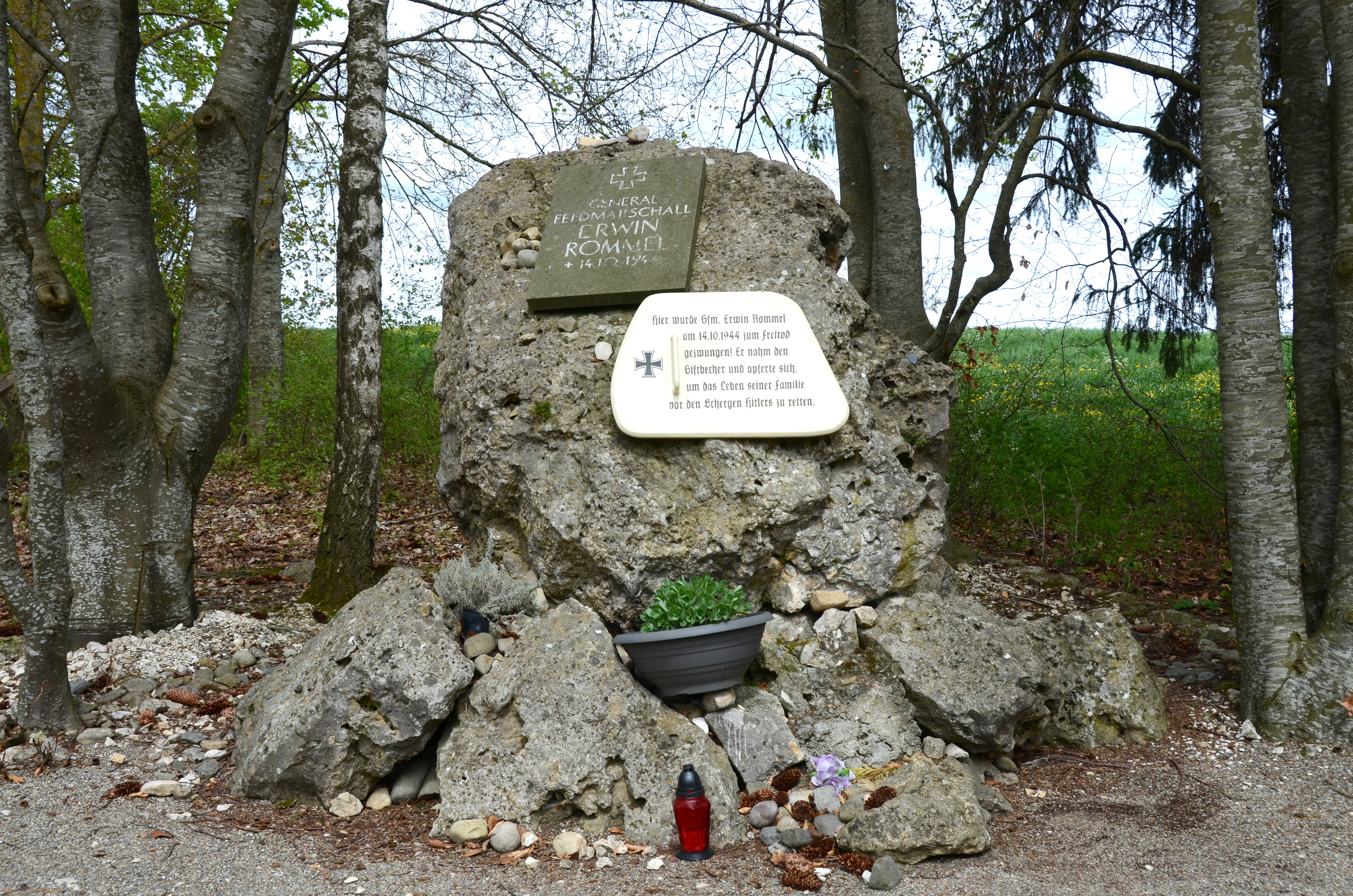
Erwin Rommel Memorial, place of his suicide with a cyanide pill, Herrlingen (2019)

Rommel was implicated by the Court of Military Honour, whose members—including Keitel, Rundstedt, and Guderian—accepted statements from conspirators that suggested his involvement in the plot against Hitler, a finding that normally would have sent him to Freisler’s People’s Court. Instead, to avoid the morale damage of a public trial, Hitler offered Rommel the choice of suicide, which he accepted on 14 October 1944. The regime then announced he had died of medical complications and granted him a state funeral.

The truth behind Rommel's death became known to the Allies when intelligence officer Charles Marshall interviewed Rommel's widow, Lucia Rommel, as well as from a letter by Rommel's son Manfred in April 1945.

== Style as military commander ==
On the Italian front in the First World War, Rommel was a successful tactician in fast-developing mobile battle and this shaped his subsequent style as a military commander. He found that taking initiative and not allowing the enemy forces to regroup led to victory. Some authors argue that his enemies were often less organised, second-rate, or depleted, and his tactics were less effective against adequately led, trained and supplied opponents and proved insufficient in the later years of the war. Others point out that through his career, he frequently fought while outnumbered and outgunned, sometimes overwhelmingly so, while having to deal with internal opponents in Germany who hoped that he would fail.

Rommel is praised by numerous authors as a great leader of men. The historian and journalist Basil Liddell Hart concludes that he was a strong leader worshipped by his troops, respected by his adversaries and deserving to be named as one of the "Great Captains of History". Owen Connelly concurs, writing that "No better exemplar of military leadership can be found" and quoting Friedrich von Mellenthin on the inexplicable mutual understanding that existed between Rommel and his troops. Hitler, though, remarked that, "Unfortunately Field-Marshal Rommel is a very great leader full of drive in times of success, but an absolute pessimist when he meets the slightest problems." Telp criticises Rommel for not extending the benevolence he showed in promoting his own officers' careers to his peers, whom he ignored or slighted in his reports.

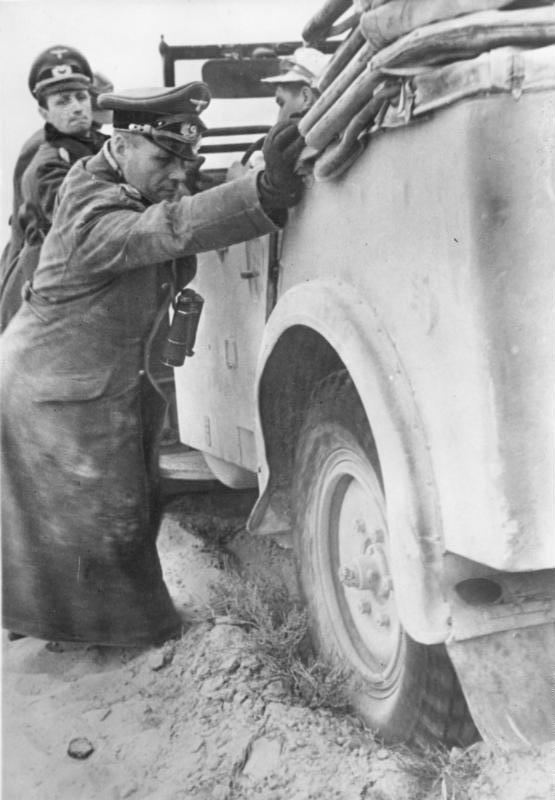
Rommel helping to free his staff car, a Škoda Superb Kfz 21

Taking his opponents by surprise and creating uncertainty in their minds were key elements in Rommel's approach to offensive warfare: he took advantage of sand storms and the dark of night to conceal the movement of his forces. He was aggressive and often directed the battle from the front or piloted a reconnaissance aircraft over the lines to get a view of the situation. When the British mounted a commando raid deep behind German lines in an effort to kill Rommel and his staff on the eve of their Crusader offensive, Rommel was indignant that the British expected to find his headquarters 400 kilometres (250 miles) behind his front. Mellenthin and Harald Kuhn write that at times in North Africa his absence from a position of communication made command of the battles of the Afrika Korps difficult. Mellenthin lists Rommel's counterattack during Operation Crusader as one such instance. Butler concurred, saying that leading from the front is a good concept but Rommel took it so far—he frequently directed the actions of a single company or battalion—that he made communication and coordination between units problematic, as well as risking his life to the extent that he could easily have been killed even by his own artillery. Albert Kesselring also complained about Rommel cruising about the battlefield like a division or corps commander; but Gause and Westphal, supporting Rommel, replied that in the African desert, only this method would work and that it was useless to try to restrain Rommel anyway. His staff officers, although admiring towards their leader, complained about the self-destructive Spartan lifestyle that made life harder, diminished his effectiveness and forced them to "bab[y] him as unobtrusively as possible".

For his leadership during the French campaign, Rommel received both praise and criticism. Many, such as General Georg Stumme, who had previously commanded the 7th Panzer Division, were impressed with the speed and success of Rommel's drive. Others were reserved or critical: Kluge, his commanding officer, argued that Rommel's decisions were impulsive and that he claimed too much credit, by falsifying diagrams or by not acknowledging contributions of other units, especially the Luftwaffe. Some pointed out that Rommel's division took the highest casualties in the campaign. Others point out that in exchange for 2,160 casualties and 42 tanks, it captured more than 100,000 prisoners and destroyed nearly two divisions' worth of enemy tanks (about 450 tanks), vehicles and guns.

Rommel spoke German with a pronounced southern German or Swabian accent. He was not a part of the Prussian aristocracy that dominated the German high command, and as such was looked upon somewhat suspiciously by the Wehrmacht's traditional power structure. Rommel felt a commander should be physically more robust than the troops he led, and should always show them an example. (Note: According to Lewin, in 1933 when Rommel became commander of a Hanoverian Jaeger battalion, which was composed of soldiers with skiing expertise, its officers gave him the mandatory test on the snow slopes. No lift was present, and the men had to climb to ski down the hillside. They trudged to the top and descended, and honour was satisfied, but the 41-year-old commander led his officers up and down the slope twice more before he let them fall out.) He expected his subordinate commanders to do the same.

Rommel was direct, unbending, tough in his manners, to superiors and subordinates alike, and disobedient even to Hitler whenever he saw fit, although gentle and diplomatic to the lower ranks. Despite being publicity-friendly, he was also shy, introverted, clumsy and overly formal even to his closest aides, judging people only on their merits, although loyal and considerate to those who had proved reliability, and he displayed a surprisingly passionate and devoted side to a very small few (including Hitler) with whom he had dropped the seemingly impenetrable barriers.

=== Relationship with Italian forces ===
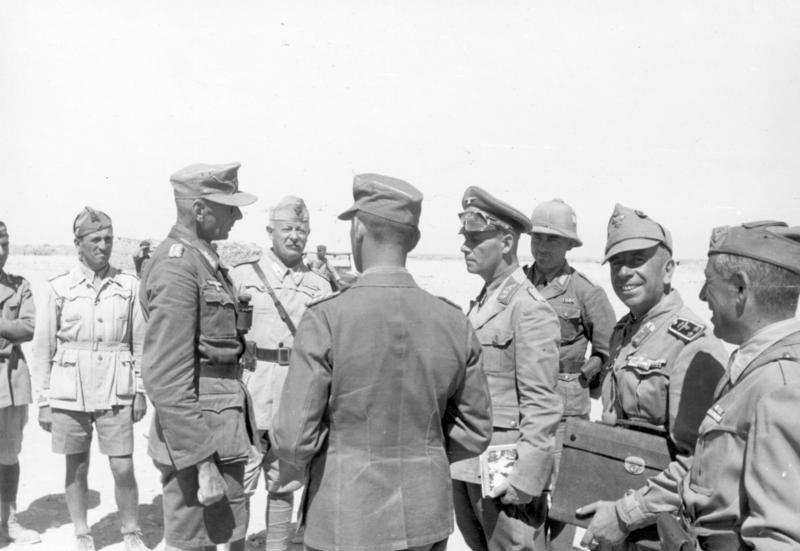
Rommel with German and Italian officers, 1942

Rommel's relationship with the Italian High Command in North Africa was generally poor. Although he was nominally subordinate to the Italians, he enjoyed a certain degree of autonomy from them; since he was directing their troops in battle as well as his own, this was bound to cause hostility among Italian commanders. Conversely, as the Italian command had control over the supplies of the forces in Africa, they resupplied Italian units preferentially, which was a source of resentment for Rommel and his staff. Rommel's direct and abrasive manner did nothing to smooth these issues.

While certainly much less proficient than Rommel in their leadership, aggression, tactical outlook and mobile warfare skills, Italian commanders were competent in logistics, strategy and artillery doctrine: their troops were ill-equipped but well-trained. As such, the Italian commanders were repeatedly at odds with Rommel over concerns with issues of supply. Field Marshal Kesselring was assigned Supreme Commander Mediterranean, at least in part to alleviate command problems between Rommel and the Italians. This effort resulted only in partial success, with Kesselring's own relationship with the Italians being unsteady and Kesselring claiming Rommel ignored him as readily as he ignored the Italians. Rommel often went directly to Hitler with his needs and concerns, taking advantage of the favouritism that the Führer displayed towards him and adding to the distrust that Kesselring and the German High Command already had of him.

According to Scianna, the opinion among the Italian military leaders was not unanimous. In general, Rommel was a target of criticism and a scapegoat for defeat rather than a glorified figure, with certain generals also trying to replace him as the heroic leader or hijack the Rommel myth for their own benefit. Nevertheless, he never became a hated figure, although the "abandonment myth", despite being repudiated by officers of the X Corps themselves, was long-lived. Many found Rommel's chaotic leadership and emotional character hard to work with, yet the Italians held him in higher regard than other German senior commanders, militarily and personally.

Very different, however, was the perception of Rommel by Italian common soldiers and NCOs, who, like the German field troops, had the deepest trust and respect for him. (Note: Spiegel quoted Goebbels: "Rommel is amazingly popular with the troops, German and Italian. He is almost a mythical figure.") Paolo Colacicchi, an officer in the Italian Tenth Army recalled that Rommel "became sort of a myth to the Italian soldiers". Rommel himself held a much more generous view about the Italian soldier than about their leadership, towards whom his disdain, deeply rooted in militarism, was not atypical, although unlike Kesselring he was incapable of concealing it. Unlike many of his superiors and subordinates who held racist views, he was usually "kindly disposed" to the Italians in general.

James J. Sadkovich cites examples of Rommel abandoning his Italian units, refusing cooperation, rarely acknowledging their achievements and other improper behaviour towards his Italian allies, Giuseppe Mancinelli, who was the liaison between German and Italian command, accused Rommel of blaming Italians for his own errors. Sadkovich names Rommel as arrogantly ethnocentric and disdainful towards Italians.

=== Views on the conduct of war ===
==== Combat ====
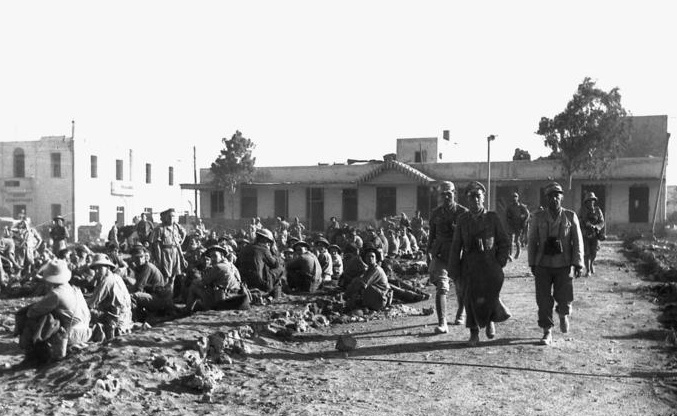
Rommel walks past Allied prisoners taken at Tobruk, 1942

Many authors describe Rommel as having a reputation of being a chivalrous, humane, and professional officer, and that he earned the respect of both his own troops and his enemies. He is also praised for his independence, energy and practical mind.

==== Attitude toward colonial troops ====
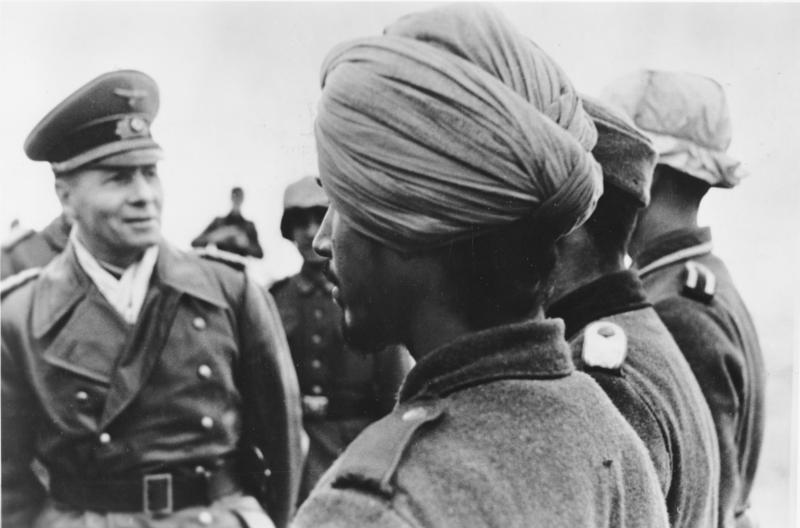
General Field Marshal Erwin Rommel inspecting a unit of the German Free India Legion in France, February 1944

By the time of the Second World War, French colonial troops were portrayed as a symbol of French depravity in Nazi propaganda; Canadian historian Myron Echenberg writes that Rommel, just like Hitler, viewed black French soldiers with particular disdain. According to author Ward Rutherford, Rommel also held racist views towards British colonial troops from India; Rutherford in his The biography of Field Marshal Erwin Rommel writes: "Not even his most sycophantic apologists have been able to evade the conclusion, fully demonstrated by his later behaviour, that Rommel was a racist who, for example, thought it desperately unfair that the British should employ 'black'—by which he meant Indian—troops against a white adversary." Vaughn Raspberry writes that Rommel and other officers considered it an insult to fight against black Africans because they considered black people to be members of "inferior races".

Bruce Watson comments that whatever racism Rommel might have had in the beginning, it was washed away when he fought in the desert. When he saw that they were fighting well, he gave the members of the 4th Indian Division high praise. Rommel and the Germans acknowledge the Gurkhas' fighting ability, although their style leaned more towards ferocity. Once he witnessed German soldiers with throats cut by a khukri knife. Originally, he did not want Chandra Bose's Indian formation (composed of the Allied Indian soldiers), captured by his own troops, to work under his command. In Normandy though, when they had already become the Indische Freiwilligen Legion der Waffen SS, he visited them and praised them for their efforts (while they still suffered general disrespect within the Wehrmacht). A review on Rutherford's book by the Pakistan Army Journal says that the statement is one of many that Rutherford uses, which lack support in authority and analysis. Rommel saying that using the Indians was unfair should also be put in perspective, considering the disbandment of the battle-hardened 4th Division by the Allies. Rommel praised the colonial troops in the battle of France: "The (French) colonial troops fought with extraordinary determination. The anti-tank teams and tank crews performed with courage and caused serious losses," though that might be an example of generals honouring their opponents so that "their own victories appear the more impressive." Reuth comments that Rommel ensured that he and his command would act decently (shown by his treatment of the Free French prisoners who were considered partisans by Hitler, the Jews and the coloured men), while he was distancing himself from Hitler's racist war in the East and deluding himself into believing that Hitler was good, only the Party big shots were evil. The black South African soldiers recount that when they were held as POWs after they were captured by Rommel, they initially slept and queued for food away from the whites, until Rommel saw this and told them that brave soldiers should all queue together. Finding this strange coming from a man fighting for Hitler, they adopted this behaviour until they went back to the Union of South Africa, where they were separated again.

There are reports that Rommel acknowledged the Maori soldiers' fighting skills, yet at the same time he complained about their methods which were unfair from the European perspective. When he asked the commander of the New Zealand 6th Infantry Brigade about his division's massacres of the wounded and POWs, the commander attributed these incidents to the Maoris in his unit. Hew Strachan notes that lapses in practising the warriors' code of war were usually attributed to ethnic groups which lived outside Europe with the implication that those ethnic groups which lived in Europe knew how to behave (although Strachan opines that such attributions were probably true). Nevertheless, according to the website of the 28th Maori Battalion, Rommel always treated them fairly and he also showed understanding with regard to war crimes.

==== Politics ====
Some authors cite, among other cases, Rommel's naive reaction to events in Poland while he was there: he paid a visit to his wife's uncle, famous Polish priest and patriotic leader Edmund Roszczynialski, who was murdered within days, but Rommel never understood this and, at his wife's urgings, kept writing letter after letter to Himmler's adjutants asking them to keep track and take care of their relative. Knopp and Mosier agree that he was naive politically, citing his request for a Jewish Gauleiter in 1943. Despite this, Lieb finds it hard to believe that a man in Rommel's position could have known nothing about atrocities, while accepting that locally he was separated from the places where these atrocities occurred. Der Spiegel comments that Rommel was simply in denial about what happened around him. Alaric Searle points out that it was the early diplomatic successes and bloodless expansion that blinded Rommel to the true nature of his beloved Führer, whom he then naively continued to support. Scheck believes it may be forever unclear whether Rommel recognised the unprecedented depraved character of the regime.

==== Civilians ====
Historian Richard J. Evans has stated that the success of Rommel's forces in Africa led to many Jews in these areas being killed by other German institutions as part of the Holocaust. Anti-Jewish and Anti-Arab violence erupted in North Africa when Rommel and Ettore Bastico regained territory there in February 1941 and then again in April 1942.

The German consul general in Tripoli consulted with Italian state and party officials about possible countermeasures against the natives, but this was the full extent of German involvement. Rommel did not directly intervene, though he advised the Italian authorities to do whatever was necessary to eliminate the danger of riots and espionage; for the German general, the rear areas were to be kept "quiet" at all costs. Thus, according to Bernhard, although he had no direct hand in the atrocities, Rommel made himself complicit in war crimes by failing to point out that international laws of war strictly prohibited certain forms of retaliation. By giving carte blanche to the Italians, Rommel implicitly condoned, and perhaps even encouraged, their war crimes". Bernhard argues that the North African campaign was "anything but war without hate", documenting rapes, ill-treatment and executions of prisoners, racially motivated killings of Arabs, Berbers and Jews, and the establishment of labour and detention camps. Gershom reports that the recommendation came from officers "speaking for Rommel", and comments, "Perhaps Rommel did not know or care about the specifics; perhaps his motivation was not hate but dispassionate efficiency. The distinctions would have escaped the men hanging from hooks."

United States Holocaust Memorial Museum describes relationship between Rommel and the proposed Einsatzgruppen Egypt as "problematic". The Museum states that this unit was to be tasked with murdering the Jewish population of North Africa, and Palestine, and it was to be attached directly to Rommel's Afrika Korps. According to the museum Rauff met with Rommel's staff in 1942 as part of preparations for this plan. The Museum states that Rommel was certainly aware that planning was taking place, even if his reaction to it isn't recorded, and while the main proposed Einsatzgruppen were never set in action, smaller units did murder Jews in North Africa.

On the other hand, Christopher Gabel remarks that Richards Evans seems to attempt to prove that Rommel was a war criminal by association but fails to produce evidence that he had actual or constructive knowledge about said crimes. Ben H. Shepherd comments that Rommel showed insight and restraint when dealing with the nomadic Arabs, the only civilians who occasionally intervened in the war and thus risked reprisals as a result. Shepherd cites a request by Rommel to the Italian High Command, in which he complained about excesses against the Arabic population and noted that reprisals without identifying the real culprits were never expedient.

The documentary Rommel's War (Rommels Krieg), made by Caron and Müllner with advice from Sönke Neitzel, states that even though it is not clear whether Rommel knew about the crimes (in Africa) or not, "his military success made possible forced labour, torture and robbery. Rommel's war is always part of Hitler's war of worldviews, whether Rommel wanted it or not." More specifically, several German historians have revealed the existence of plans to exterminate Jews in Egypt and Palestine, if Rommel had succeeded in his goal of invading the Middle East during 1942 by SS unit embedded to Afrika Korps.

According to Mallmann and Cüppers, a post-war CIA report described Rommel as having met with Walther Rauff, who was responsible for the unit, and been disgusted after learning about the plan from him and as having sent him on his way; but they conclude that such a meeting is hardly possible as Rauff was sent to report to Rommel at Tobruk on 20 July and Rommel was then 500 km away conducting the First El Alamein. On 29 July, Rauff's unit was sent to Athens, expecting to enter Africa when Rommel crossed the Nile. However, in view of the Axis' deteriorating situation in Africa it returned to Germany in September.

Historian Jean-Christoph Caron opines that there is no evidence that Rommel knew or would have supported Rauff's mission; he also believes Rommel bore no direct responsibility regarding the SS's looting of gold in Tunisia. Historian Haim Saadon, Director of the Center of Research on North African Jewry in WWII, goes further, stating that there was no extermination plan: Rauff's documents show that his foremost concern was helping the Wehrmacht to win, and he came up with the idea of forced labour camps in the process. By the time these labour camps were in operation, according to Ben H. Shepherd, Rommel had already been retreating and there is no proof of his contact with the Einsatzkommando.

Haaretz comments that the CIA report is most likely correct regarding both the interaction between Rommel and Rauff and Rommel's objections to the plan: Rauff's assistant Theodor Saevecke, and declassified information from Rauff's file, both report the same story. Haaretz also remarks that Rommel's influence probably softened the Nazi authorities' attitude to the Jews and to the civilian population generally in North Africa.

Rolf-Dieter Müller comments that the war in North Africa, while as bloody as any other war, differed considerably from the war of annihilation in eastern Europe, because it was limited to a narrow coastline and hardly affected the population.

Showalter writes that:

From the desert campaign’s beginning, both sides consciously sought to wage a "clean" war—war without hate, as Rommel put it in his reflections. Explanations include the absence of civilians and the relative absence of Nazis; the nature of the environment, which conveyed a "moral simplicity and transparency"; and the control of command on both sides by prewar professionals, producing a British tendency to depict war in the imagery of a game, and the corresponding German pattern of seeing it as a test of skill and a proof of virtue. The nature of the fighting as well diminished the last-ditch, close-quarter actions that are primary nurturers of mutual bitterness. A battalion overrun by tanks usually had its resistance broken so completely that nothing was to be gained by a broken-backed final stand.

Joachim Käppner writes that while the conflict in North Africa was not as bloody as in Eastern Europe, the Afrika Korps committed some war crimes. Historian Martin Kitchen states that the reputation of the Afrika Korps was preserved by circumstances: The sparsely populated desert areas did not lend themselves to ethnic cleansing; the German forces never reached the large Jewish populations in Egypt and Palestine; and in the urban areas of Tunisia and Tripolitania the Italian government constrained the German efforts to discriminate against or eliminate Jews who were Italian citizens. Despite this, the North African Jews themselves believed that it was Rommel who prevented the "Final Solution" from being carried out against them when Germany might dominate North Africa from Egypt to Morocco. According to Curtis and Remy, 120,000 Jews lived in Algeria, 200,000 in Morocco, about 80,000 in Tunisia. Remy writes that this number was unchanged following the German invasion of Tunisia in 1942 while Curtis notes that 5000 of these Jews would be sent to forced labour camps. and 26,000 in Libya.

In North Africa, Rommel's troops laid down landmines, which in decades to come killed and maimed thousands of civilians. Since statistics started in the 1980s, 3,300 people have lost their lives, and 7,500 maimed There are disputed whether the landmines in El Alamein, which constitute the most notable portion of landmines left over from World War II, were left by the Afrika Korps or the British Army led by Field Marshal Montgomery. Egypt has not joined the Mine Ban Treaty until this day.

Rommel sharply protested the Jewish policies and other immoralities and was an opponent of the Gestapo. He also refused to comply with Hitler's order to execute Jewish POWs. (Note: Mitcham's Life and Death of the Afrika Korps: "OKW sent an order ... spoke of numerous German "political refugees" (that is, Jews) ...) Controversial author Bryan Mark Rigg writes: "The only place in the army where one might find a place of refuge was in the Deutsches Afrika-Korps (DAK) under the leadership of the 'Desert Fox,' Field Marshal Erwin Rommel. According to this study's files, his half-Jews were not as affected by the racial laws as most others serving on the European continent." He notes, though, that "Perhaps Rommel failed to enforce the order to discharge half-Jews because he was unaware of it".

Captain Horst van Oppenfeld (a staff officer to Colonel Claus von Stauffenberg and a quarter-Jew) says that Rommel did not concern himself with the racial decrees and he had never experienced any trouble caused by his ancestry during his time in the DAK even if Rommel never personally interfered on his behalf. Another quarter-Jew, Fritz Bayerlein, became a famous general and Rommel's chief-of-staff, despite also being a bisexual, which made his situation even more precarious.

Building the Atlantic Wall was officially the responsibility of the Organisation Todt, which was not under Rommel's command, but he enthusiastically joined the task, protesting slave labour and suggesting that they should recruit French civilians and pay them good wages. Despite this, French civilians and Italian prisoners of war held by the Germans were forced by officials under the Vichy government, the Todt Organization and the SS forces to work on building some of the defences Rommel requested, in appalling conditions according to historian Will Fowler. Although they got basic wages, the workers complained because it was too little and there was no heavy equipment.

German troops worked almost round-the-clock under very harsh conditions, with Rommel's rewards being accordions.

Rommel was one of the commanders who protested the Oradour-sur-Glane massacre.

== Reputation as a military commander ==
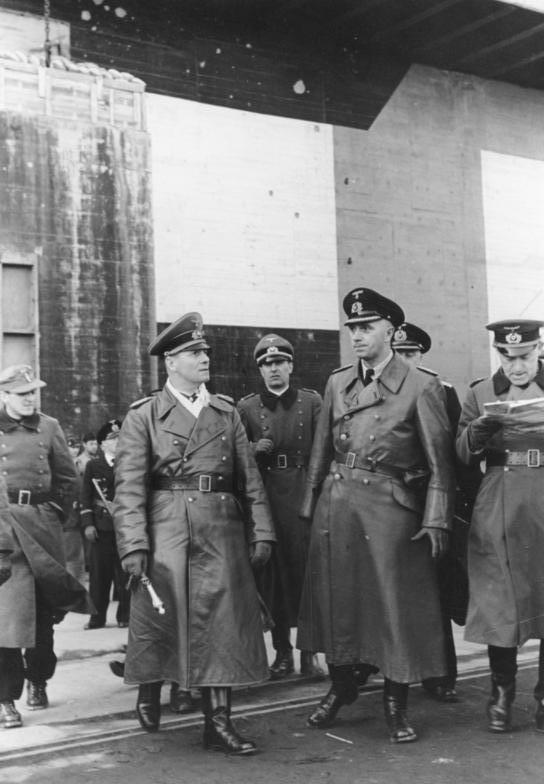
Rommel and Vice Admiral Friedrich Ruge visiting the U-boat base in La Rochelle, France, February 1944

Rommel was famous in his lifetime, including among his adversaries. His tactical prowess and decency in the treatment of Allied prisoners earned him the respect of opponents including Claude Auchinleck, Archibald Wavell, George S. Patton, and Bernard Montgomery.

Rommel's modern military reputation is controversial: critics include Martin van Creveld, David T. Zabecki, Klaus Naumann and Wolf Heckmann. Yet many senior officers — among them Norman Schwarzkopf, Ariel Sharon, Moshe Dayan, Sun Li-jen and Wesley Clark — admire his methods and leadership, emphasizing the specific conditions of desert wars. During the recent desert wars, Rommel's military theories and experiences attracted great interest from policymakers and military instructors.

Larry T. Addington, Niall Barr, Douglas Porch and Robert Citino, are sceptical of Rommel as an operational, let alone strategic level commander.

The historian Geoffrey P. Megargee points out Rommel's playing the German and Italian command structures against each other to his advantage.

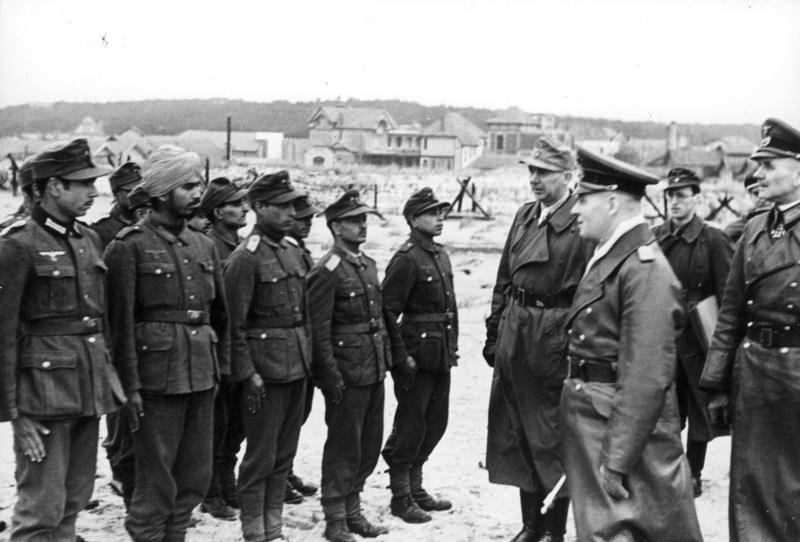
Inspecting the soldiers of the anti-British Free India Legion, France, 1944

T. L. McMahon, Martin Blumenson, Joseph Forbes, and Siegfried Storbeck argue that Rommel combined operational vision, tactical flexibility, and an intuitive battlefield sense, but was increasingly constrained by limited strategic resources, lack of authority over logistics, and growing interference from Hitler and other Nazi leaders. Maurice Remy adds that Rommel's controversial stance on Malta was the only a logical strategic choice.

Rommel was among the few Axis commanders (the others being Isoroku Yamamoto and Reinhard Heydrich) who were targeted for assassination by Allied planners.

== Debate about atrocities ==
=== Executions of prisoners in France ===
In France, Rommel ordered the execution of one French officer who refused three times to cooperate when being taken prisoner; there are disputes as to whether this execution was justified. Caddick-Adams comments that this would make Rommel a war criminal condemned by his own hand, and that other authors overlook this episode. Butler notes that the officer refused to surrender three times and thus died in a courageous but foolhardy way. French historian Petitfrère remarks that Rommel was in a hurry and had no time for useless palavers, although this act was still debatable. Telp remarks that, "he treated prisoners of war with consideration. On one occasion, he was forced to order the shooting of a French lieutenant-colonel for refusing to obey his captors." Scheck says, "Although there is no evidence incriminating Rommel himself, his unit did fight in areas where German massacres of black French prisoners of war were extremely common in June 1940."

Historian David Stone notes that acts of shooting surrendered prisoners were carried out by Rommel's 7th Panzer Division and observes contradictory statements in Rommel's account of the events; Rommel initially wrote that "any enemy troops were wiped out or forced to withdraw" but also added that "many prisoners taken were hopelessly drunk." Stone attributes the massacres of soldiers from the 53ème Regiment d'Infanterie Coloniale (N'Tchoréré's unit) on 7 June to the 5th Infantry Division. (Note: "On 7 June, a number of soldiers of the 53ème Régiment d'Infanterie Coloniale were shot, probably by troops of the 5th Panzer.") Historian Daniel Butler agrees that it was possible that the massacre at Le Quesnoy happened given the existence of Nazis, such as Hanke, in Rommel's division, while stating that in comparison with other German units, few sources regarding such actions of the men of the 7th Panzer exist. Butler believes that "it's almost impossible to imagine" Rommel authorising or countenancing such actions. He also writes that "Some accusers have twisted a remark in Rommel's own account of the action in the village of Le Quesnoy as proof that he at least tacitly condoned the executions—'any enemy troops were either wiped out or forced to withdraw'—but the words themselves as well as the context of the passage hardly support the contention."

=== Treatment of Jews and other civilians in North Africa ===
Giordana Terracina writes that: "On April 3, the Italians recaptured Benghazi and a few months later the Afrika Korps led by Rommel was sent to Libya and began the deportation of the Jews of Cyrenaica in the Giado concentration camp and other smaller towns in Tripolitania. This measure was accompanied by shooting, also in Benghazi, of some Jews guilty of having welcomed the British troops, on their arrival, treating them as liberators." Gershom states that Italian authorities were responsible for bringing Jews into their concentration camps, which were "not built to exterminate its inmates", yet as the water and food supply was meagre, were not built to keep humans alive either. Also according to Gershom, the German consul in Tripoli knew about the process and trucks used to transport supplies to Rommel were sometimes used to transport Jews, despite all the problems the German forces were having. The Jerusalem Post's review of Gershom Gorenberg's War of shadows writes that: "The Italians were far more brutal with civilians, including Libyan Jews, than Rommel’s Afrika Korps, which by all accounts abided by the laws of war. But nobody worried that the Italians who sent Jews to concentration camps in Libya, would invade British-held Egypt, let alone Mandatory Palestine."

According to German author Wolfgang Proske, Rommel forbade his soldiers from buying anything from the Jewish population of Tripoli, used Jewish slave labour and commanded Jews to clear out minefields by walking on them ahead of his forces. According to Proske, some of the Libyan Jews were eventually sent to concentration camps. Historians Christian Schweizer and Peter Lieb note that: "Over the last few years, even though the social science teacher Wolfgang Proske has sought to participate in the discussion [on Rommel] with very strong opinions, his biased submissions are not scientifically received." The Heidenheimer Zeitung notes that Proske was the publisher of his main work Täter, Helfer, Trittbrettfahrer – NS-Belastete von der Ostalb, after failing to have it published by another publisher.

According to historian Michael Wolffsohn, during the Africa campaign, preparations for committing genocide against the North African Jews were in full swing and a thousand of them were transported to East European concentration camps. At the same time, he recommends the Bundeswehr to keep the names and traditions associated with Rommel (although Wolffsohn opines that focus should be put on the politically thoughtful soldier he became at the end of his life, rather than the swashbuckler and the humane rogue).

Robert Satloff writes in his book Among the Righteous: Lost Stories from the Holocaust's Long Reach into Arab Lands that as the German and Italian forces retreated across Libya towards Tunisia, the Jewish population became victim upon which they released their anger and frustration. According to Satloff Afrika Korps soldiers plundered Jewish property all along the Libyan coast. This violence and persecution only came to an end with the arrival of General Montgomery in Tripoli on 23 January 1943. According to Maurice Remy, although there were antisemitic individuals in the Afrika Korps, actual cases of abuse are not known, even against the Jewish soldiers of the Eighth Army. Remy quotes Isaac Levy, the Senior Jewish Chaplain of the Eighth Army, as saying that he had never seen "any sign or hint that the soldiers [of the Afrika Korps] are antisemitic.". The Telegraph comments: "Accounts suggest that it was not Field Marshal Erwin Rommel but the ruthless SS colonel Walter Rauff who stripped Tunisian Jews of their wealth."

Commenting on Rommel's conquest of Tunisia, Marvin Perry writes that: "The bridgehead Rommel established in Tunisia enabled the SS to herd Jews into slave labor camps."

Jan Friedmann writes that: "The SS had established a network of labor camps in Tunisia. More than 2,500 Tunisian Jews died in six months of German rule, and the regular army was also involved in executions." Caron writes in Der Spiegel that the camps were organised in early December 1942 by Nehring, the commander in Tunisia, and Rauff, while Rommel was retreating. As commander of the German Afrika Korps, Nehring would continue to use Tunisian forced labour. According to Caddick-Adams, no Waffen-SS served under Rommel in Africa at any time and most of the activities of Rauff's detachment happened after Rommel's departure. Shepherd notes that during this time Rommel was retreating and there is no evidence that he had contact with the Einsatzkommando. Addressing the call of some authors to contextualise Rommel's actions in Italy and North Africa, Wolfgang Mährle argues that while it is undeniable that Rommel played the role of a Generalfeldmarschall in a criminal war, this only illustrates in a limited way his personal attitude and the actions resulted from that.

=== In Italy ===
Gerhard Schreiber quotes Rommel's orders, issued together with Kesselring: "Sentimentality concerning the Badoglio following gangs in the uniforms of the former ally is misplaced. Whoever fights against the German soldier has lost any right to be treated well and shall experience toughness reserved for the rabble which betrays friends. Every member of the German troop has to adopt this stance." Schreiber writes that this is exceptionally harsh and, according to him, "hate fuelled" order brutalised the war and was clearly aimed at Italian soldiers, not just partisans. Dennis Showalter writes that "Rommel was not involved in Italy's partisan war, though the orders he issued prescribing death for Italian soldiers taken in arms and Italian civilians sheltering escaped British prisoners do not suggest he would have behaved significantly different from his Wehrmacht counterparts."

According to Maurice Remy, orders issued by Hitler during Rommel's stay in a hospital resulted in massacres in the course of Operation Achse, disarming the Italian forces after the armistice with the Allies in 1943. Remy also states that Rommel treated his Italian opponents with his usual fairness, requiring that the prisoners should be accorded the same conditions as German civilians. Remy opines that the order that mentioned "Badoglio gangs" should not be taken out of context. Peter Lieb agrees that the order did not radicalise the war and that the disarmament in Rommel's area of responsibility happened without major bloodshed. Italian internees were sent to Germany for forced labour, but Rommel was unaware of this. Klaus Schmider comments that the writings of Lieb and others succeed in vindicating Rommel "both with regards to his likely complicity in the July plot as well as his repeated refusal to carry out illegal orders." Rommel withheld Hitler's Commando Order to execute captured commandos from his Army Group B, with his units reporting that they were treating commandos as regular POWs. It is likely that he had acted similarly in North Africa. Historian Szymon Datner argues that Rommel may have been simply trying to conceal the atrocities of Nazi Germany from the Allies. Remy states that although Rommel had heard rumours about massacres while fighting in Africa, his personality, combined with special circumstances, meant that he was not fully confronted with the reality of atrocities before 1944. When Rommel learned about the atrocities that SS Division Leibstandarte committed in Italy in September 1943, he allegedly forbade his son from joining the Waffen-SS. Lieb also writes that there was no known order which targeted the population. The Schwäbische Zeitung wrote in 2024 that Rommel's hands remained clean by the standard of contemporary law, and that while the orders' tone might be criticized as harsh, such orders were common on both sides of the conflict and also came from generals like George Patton.

== Relationship with Nazism ==
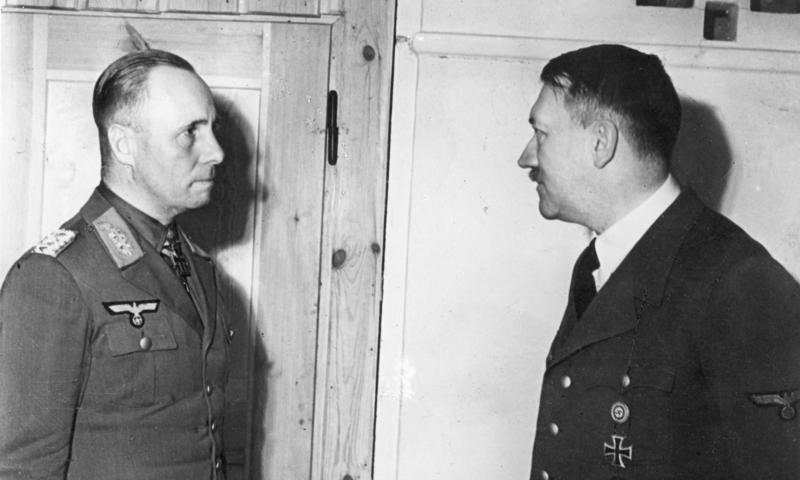
Erwin Rommel and Adolf Hitler in 1942

Rommel was not a member of the Nazi Party. Rommel and Hitler had a close and genuine, if complicated, personal relationship.

Following the Western campaign, Rommel sent Hitler a specially prepared diary on the 7th Division, he received a letter of thanks from the dictator. (According to Speer, he would normally send extremely unclear reports which annoyed Hitler greatly.) According to Maurice Remy, the relationship, which Remy calls "a dream marriage", showed the first crack only in 1942, and later gradually turned into, in the words of German writer Ernst Jünger (in contact with Rommel in Normandy), "Haßliebe" (a love-hate relationship). Ruge's diary and Rommel's letters to his wife show his mood fluctuating wildly regarding Hitler: while he showed disgust towards the atrocities and disappointment towards the situation, he was overjoyed to welcome a visit from Hitler, only to return to depression the next day when faced with reality.

Hitler displayed the same emotions. Amid growing doubts and differences, he would remain eager for Rommel's calls (they had almost daily, hour-long, highly animated conversations, with the preferred topic being technical innovations): he once almost grabbed the telephone out of Linge's hand. But, according to Linge, seeing Rommel's disobedience Hitler also realised his mistake in building up Rommel, whom not only the Afrika Korps but also the German people in general now considered the German God. Hitler tried to fix the dysfunctional relationship many times without results, with Rommel calling his attempts "Sunlamp Treatment", although later he said that "Once I have loved the Führer, and I still do." Remy and Der Spiegel remark that the statement was very much genuine, while Watson notes that Rommel believed he deserved to die for his treasonable plan.

Rommel was an ambitious man who took advantage of his proximity to Hitler and willingly accepted the propaganda campaigns designed for him by Goebbels. On one hand, he wanted personal promotion and the realisation of his ideals. On the other hand, being elevated by the traditional system that gave preferential treatment to aristocratic officers would be betrayal of his aspiration "to remain a man of the troops". (Note: Maurice Remy: "... Rommel wollte bleiben, was es war: ein Mann der Truppe.") In 1918, Rommel refused an invitation to a prestigious officer training course, and with it, the chance to be promoted to general. Additionally, he had no inclination towards the political route, preferring to remain a soldier ("Nur-Soldat"). He was thus attracted by the Common Man theme which promised to level German society, the glorification of the national community, and the idea of a soldier of common background who served the Fatherland with talent and got rewarded by another common man who embodied the will of the German people. While he had much indignation towards Germany's contemporary class problem, this self-association with the Common Man went along well with his desire to simulate the knights of the past, who also led from the front. Rommel seemed to enjoy the idea of peace, as shown by his words to his wife in August 1939: "You can trust me, we have taken part in one World War, but as long as our generation live, there will not be a second", as well as his letter sent to her the night before the Invasion of Poland, in which he expressed (in Maurice Remy's phrase) "boundless optimism": "I still believe the atmosphere will not become more bellicose." Butler remarks that Rommel was centre in his politics, leaning a little to the left in his attitude.

Messenger argues that Rommel's attitude towards Hitler changed only after the Allied invasion of Normandy when Rommel came to realise that the war could not be won, while Maurice Remy suggests that Rommel never truly broke away from the relationship with Hitler but praises him for "always [having] the courage to oppose him whenever his conscience required so". The historian Peter Lieb states that it was not clear whether the threat of defeat was the only reason Rommel wanted to switch sides. The relationship seemed to go significantly downhill after a conversation in July 1943, in which Hitler told Rommel that if they did not win the war, the Germans could rot. Rommel even began to think that it was lucky that his Afrika Korps were now safe as POWs and could escape Hitler's Wagnerian ending. Die Welt commented in 2011 that Hitler chose Rommel as his favourite because he was apolitical, and that the combination of his military expertise and circumstances allowed Rommel to remain clean.

Rommel's political inclinations were a controversial matter even among the contemporary Nazi elites. Rommel himself, while showing support to some facets of the Nazi ideology and enjoying the propaganda machine that the Nazis had built around him, was enraged by the Nazi media's effort to portray him as an early Party member and son of a mason, forcing them to correct this misinformation. The Nazi elites were not comfortable with the idea of a national icon who did not wholeheartedly support the regime. Hitler and Goebbels, his main supporters, tended to defend him. When Rommel was being considered for appointment as Commander-in-Chief of the Army in the summer of 1942, Goebbels wrote in his diary that Rommel "is ideologically sound, is not just sympathetic to the National Socialists. He is a National Socialist; he is a troop leader with a gift for improvisation, personally courageous and extraordinarily inventive. These are the kinds of soldiers we need." Despite this, they gradually saw that his grasp of political realities and his views could be very different from theirs. (Note: Kubetzky: "Politics-wise, he has nothing but fantastic conceptions." (Goebbels' diary, after the assassination)) Hitler knew, though, that Rommel's optimistic and combative character was indispensable for his war efforts. When Rommel lost faith in the final victory and Hitler's leadership, Hitler and Goebbels tried to find an alternative in Manstein to remedy the fighting will and "political direction" of other generals but did not succeed.

Meanwhile, officials who did not like Rommel, such as Bormann and Schirach, whispered to each other that he was not a Nazi at all. Rommel's relationship to the Nazi elites, other than Hitler and Goebbels, was mostly hostile. Ultimately Rommel's enemies worked together to bring him down.

Maurice Remy concludes that, unwillingly and probably without ever realising it, Rommel was part of a murderous regime, although he never actually grasped the core of Nazism. Peter Lieb sees Rommel as a person who could not be put into a single drawer, although problematic by modern moral standards, and suggests people should personally decide for themselves whether Rommel should remain a role model or not. He was a Nazi general in some aspects, considering his support for the leader cult (Führerkult) and the Volksgemeinschaft, but he was not an antisemite, nor a war criminal, nor a radical ideological fighter. Historian Cornelia Hecht remarks "It is really hard to know who the man behind the myth was," noting that in numerous letters he wrote to his wife during their almost 30-year marriage, he commented little on political issues as well as his personal life as a husband and a father.

== Rommel myth and post–World War II influence ==
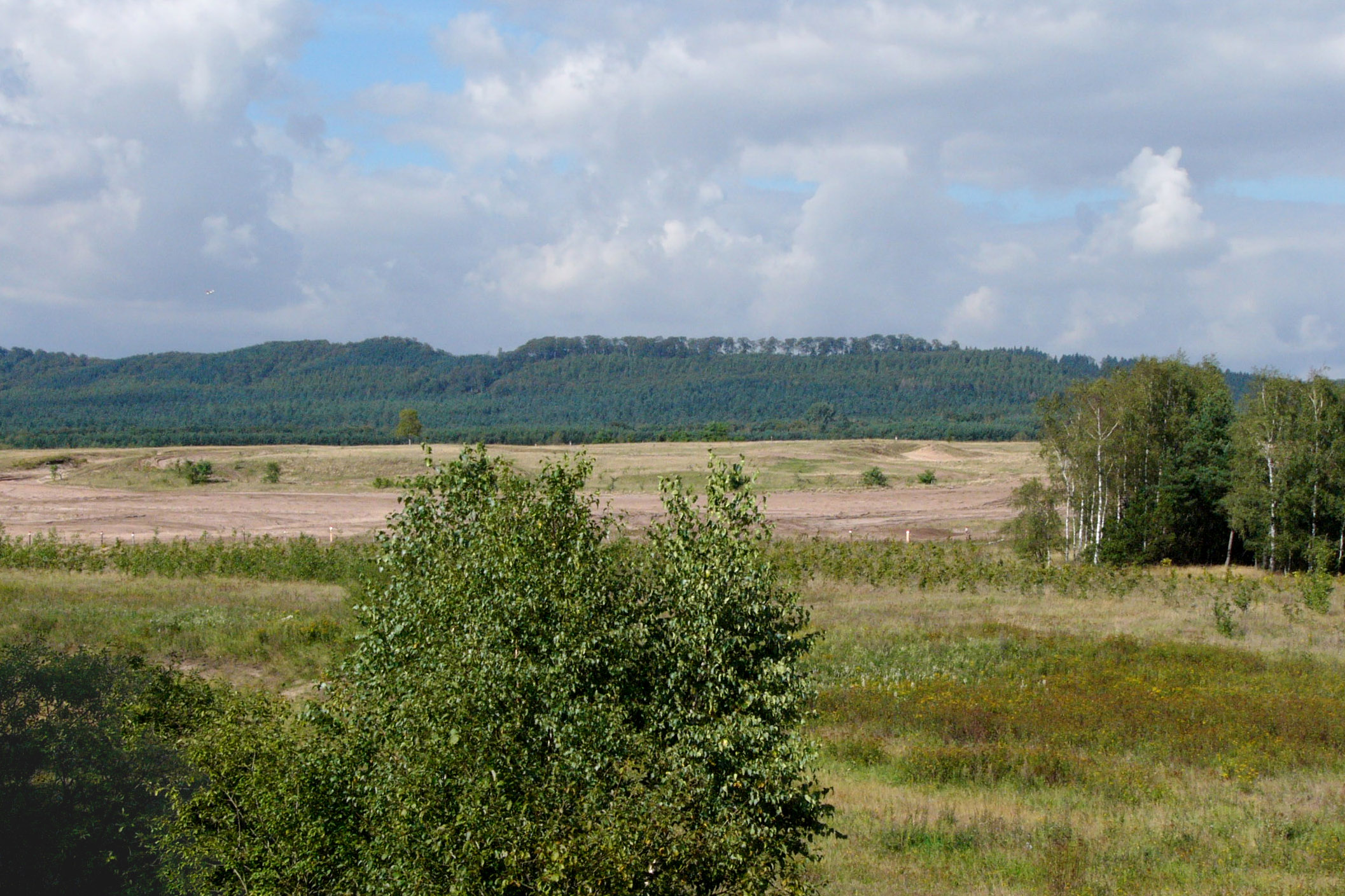
The Field Marshal Rommel Barracks' exercise field with the Teutoburg Forest, usually affiliated with Arminius, in the background. Critics note that the blend of the two figures, represented by the placing of a Rommel portrait and an Arminius statue together in the main building, seems to combine Germanic cults with veneration towards the Wehrmacht.

According to revisionist authors, assessments of Rommel have been distorted by politically shaped views, creating what they call the “Rommel myth”. This allegedly mythic image portrays him as an apolitical, brilliant commander, a victim of Nazi Germany, and a participant in the 20 July plot against Adolf Hitler. Some writers, however, use “Rommel Myth” or “Rommel Legend” in a neutral or even positive sense. The myth’s roots lie in Rommel’s early quest for success in World War I and in his best-selling 1937 book Infantry Attacks.

It solidified during the early years of World War II as part of Nazi propaganda praising the Wehrmacht, with Rommel’s cooperation. In North Africa it was amplified by the British press, which sought to explain Allied failures there. British military and political figures reinforced this heroic image, and Churchill called Rommel an “extraordinary bold and clever opponent” and a “great field commander” after the fall of Tobruk.

Rommel has been seen as the embodiment of the knight of the Bundeswehr, which, according to vom Hagen, "was and is" accepted by Germany's NATO partners. When his image was challenged in the late 1990s, three leading generals of the Bundeswehr, namely Edgar Trost, Hartmut Bagger and Helmut Willmann, defended him and named him their personal role model. At the time, Lieutenant General Edgar Trost, then Deputy Inspector of the Army and also a historian, writing for the journal Die Gebirgstruppe defended Bundeswehr's naming conventions and described Rommel as an "outstanding soldier" worthy of tradition for his "service to the fatherland." Trost wrote that, "the Bundeswehr consciously intends to build upon the many examples of human excellence in all periods of our history, on exemplary soldier conduct and outstanding military achievements, on honorable actions and courageous fighting, on great superiors and loyal subordinates, on comradeship and sacrifice" and noted that attitude to the Wehrmacht as a whole and "the critical evaluation of the individual soldier's overall personality and conduct" should be distinguished.

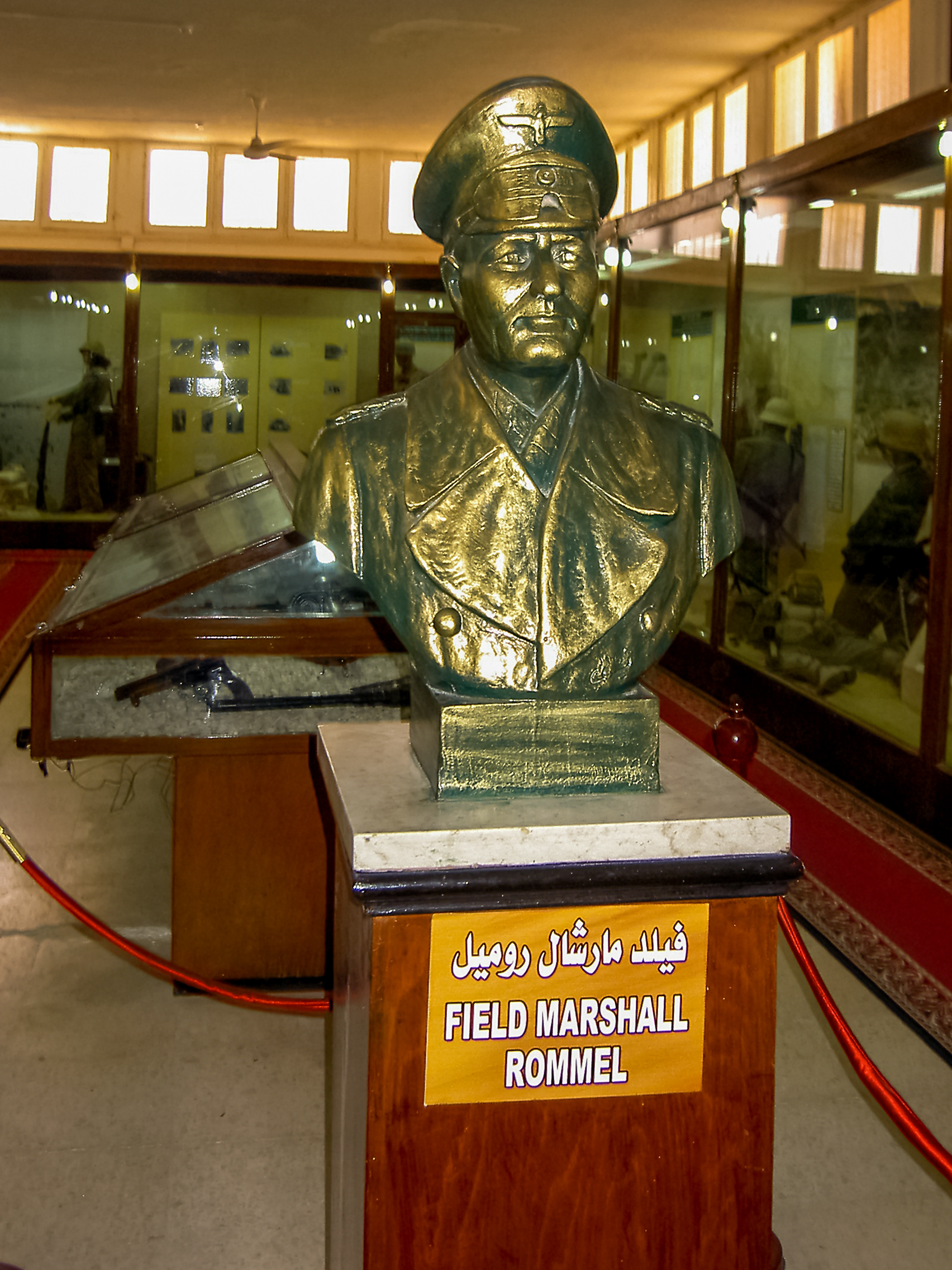
Bust of Rommel at Al Alamein war museum in Egypt, which was built by Anwar Sadat in honour of Rommel. The museum was later expanded into a general war museum but Rommel still remains a central figure.
