= Margival =

- Commune
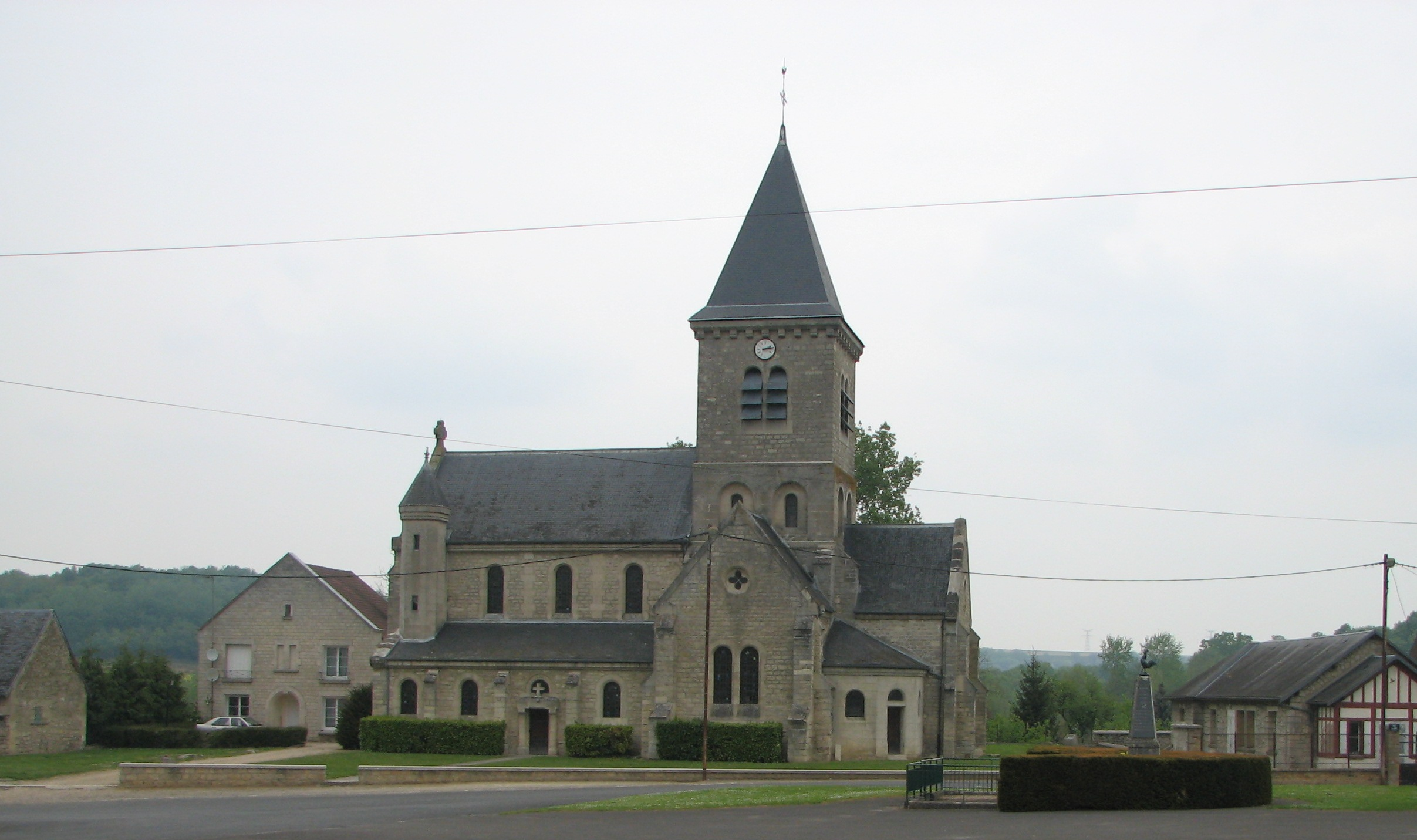
- The church of Margival

- Coat of arms
- Location of Margival
- Location within France Location within Hauts-de-France
- Coordinates: 49°26′07″N 3°24′09″E
- Country: France
- Region: Hauts-de-France
- Department: Aisne
- Arrondissement: Soissons
- Canton: Fère-en-Tardenois
- Intercommunality: Val de l'Aisne

Government
  - Mayor (2026–32): Jean-Pierre Poletz
- Area^{1}: 5.47 km^{2} (2.11 sq mi)
- Elevation: 81 m (266 ft)
- Highest elevation: 164 m (538 ft)
- Lowest elevation: 66 m (217 ft)
- Population (2023): 377
  - Density: 68.9/km^{2} (179/sq mi)
- Time zone: UTC+01:00 (CET)
  - Summer (DST): UTC+02:00 (CEST)
- INSEE/Postal code: 02464 /02880
- ^{1} French Land Register data, which excludes lakes, ponds, glaciers > 1 km^{2} (0.386 sq mi or 247 acres) and river estuaries.

Margival (French pronunciation: [maʁʒival]) is a commune in the Aisne department in Hauts-de-France in northern France.

It is located 10 kilometres (6.2 mi) northeast of Soissons.

== History ==
During World War II, the Führerhauptquartier Wolfsschlucht II, one of the Adolf Hitler's Western Front military headquarters, was built there.

== Population ==
Historical population
Year	Pop.	±% p.a.
1968	258	—
1975	264	+0.33%
1982	321	+2.83%
1990	321	+0.00%
1999	325	+0.14%
2007	323	−0.08%
2012	353	+1.79%
2017	370	+0.95%
2023	377	+0.31%
Source: INSEE

== See also ==
- Communes of the Aisne department
