= Wolfsschlucht II =

One of Adolf Hitler's Headquarters

Coordinates: 49°26′48.07″N 3°24′27.77″E

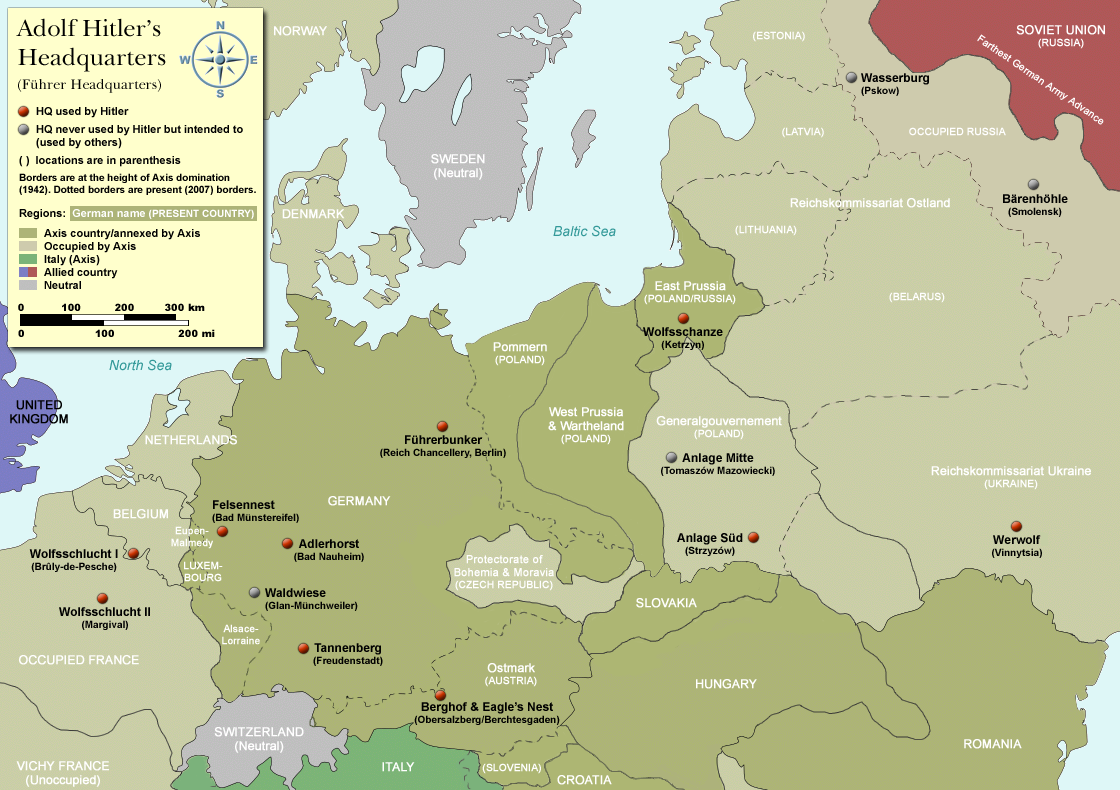
Map of FHQ Wolfsschlucht II location in Europe

Führerhauptquartier Wolfsschlucht II (English: Wolf Canyon) or W2 was the codename used for one of Adolf Hitler's World War II Western Front military headquarters located in Margival, 10 km northeast of Soissons in the department of Aisne in France. It was one of many Führer Headquarters throughout Europe but was used only once by Adolf Hitler, June 16 and 17, 1944 for a meeting with Field Marshals Erwin Rommel and Gerd von Rundstedt about the Normandy Front.

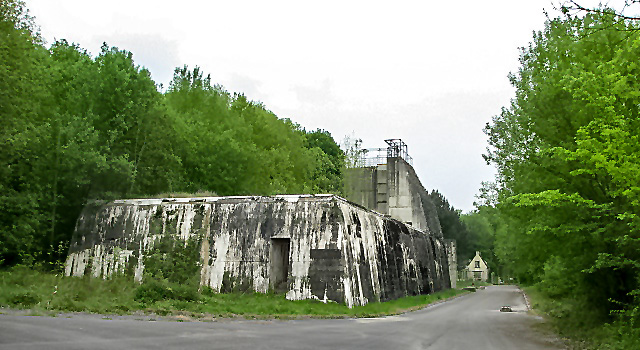
Wolfsschlucht II

At the meeting, Rommel advocated, among other things, ending the war, to Hitler's fury. During the meeting, an allied air raid forced the group to descend into a bomb shelter. Later, a malfunctioning V-1 flying bomb struck a few miles from Margival, after which Hitler departed for Germany, never to return.

== See also ==
- Führer Headquarters
