= Kanoria =

Kanoria is a surname. Notable people with the surname include:

- Hemant Kanoria, Indian entrepreneur
- Sanjeev Kanoria, liver transplant surgeon
- Sunil Kanoria, Indian businessman
