= Murtaza Ali Khan (film critic) =

Indian film critic

- Born: 25 February 1988 (age 38); Delhi
- Education: Jamia Millia Islamia
- Occupations: Film critic and journalist
- Years active: 2010-present

Murtaza Ali Khan is an Indian film critic and journalist. He is the film editor of the New York City-based magazine Café Dissensus. He currently contributes to leading publications like The Hindu and The Sunday Guardian. He has also written for DailyO, Huffington Post India, Newslaundry, and The Quint.

== Career ==
While working in the corporate world he soon began to realize his urge for writing on cinema and started contributing film reviews to online publications like DearCinema, Frontier Weekly, Desimartini and Jamuura. As a film critic he wanted to introduce the viewers to the best of cinema and help them develop individual taste. During this time he wrote reviews for DearCinema, Frontier Weekly and Desimartini where he is listed as a movie jockey. For Jamuura he has written essays on classics like Rashomon, Pyaasa, and Jalsaghar.

Soon he decided to follow his passion and pursue his career as a film critic. From June 2015 to February 2018 he contributed to the Huffington Post India as a freelancer. Since November 2017, he has been doing features and contributing to the interview section for The Hindu. He started working as the Film Editor for the New York-based magazine Café Dissensus from July 2018. He is presently reviewing films for The Sunday Guardian also.

=== Interviews and Interactions ===
Apart from writing extensively on cinema and culture, Murtaza Ali Khan has interviewed famous personalities like Indian Master Chef Imtiaz Qureshi, musician Susmit Bose, British choreographer Wayne McGregor, Japanese actress Yuna Taira, Indian actor Sanjay Mishra, filmmaker Danish Renzu, standup comedian Sunil Grover and screenwriter Anjum Rajabali.

Murtaza Ali Khan also shares his views on many important topics on changing scenario of Indian cinema in different platforms often.

==== Television/Radio Debates and Discussions ====
Murtaza Ali Khan regularly appears as a guest panelist on various television channels.

Support for Newton's selection as India's Official entry at the 90th Academy Awards

On 22 September 2017, speaking at the NewsX show Speak Out India, alongside the director and lead actor of Newton Amit V. Masurkar and Pankaj Tripathi, respectively, Murtaza Ali Khan welcomed the committee’s decision for choosing a film with a realistic and hard-hitting subject like Newton for the 90th Academy Awards. He also shared his thoughts on the film’s prospects at the 2018 Oscars.

Discussion on India International Film Festival 2018

Murtaza Ali Khan was invited to take part in discussion on India International Film Festival aired on All India Radio. He conducted the program both in English and Hindi in discussion with senior journalist K. G. Suresh and film critic Arnab Banerjee, respectively.

== Other works ==
=== Panel Discussions ===
Murtaza Ali Khan alongside noted journalist, documentary film maker and political commentator Paranjoy Guha Thakurta took part in the panel discussion on the topic "Film Journalism: Is it about the content or profits?" organized by Juxtapose 2018, the Annual Academic Meet of the department of Journalism, Lady Shri Ram College for Women on 27 September 2018.

Murtaza Ali Khan was a part of a panel discussion on the topic "Digital Media & Online journalism" organized as part of Digital Transformation in Context of New India Summit at New Delhi Institute of Management alongside leading names of the media and corporate world on 7 October 2017.

Murtaza Ali Khan was a part of a panel discussion titled "Health Through Lens" held at the Mahogany Hall, India Habitat Centre. The discussion which featured professionals from the field of media, film and medicine as part of the International Short Film and Arts Festival (FISFA) was moderated by Dr. Nisanth Menon on 26 April 2018.

Murtaza Ali Khan discussed Singaporean filmmaker Boo Junfeng's celebrated film Apprentice at the 2017 Singapore International Film Festival, held at Siri Fort Auditorium, New Delhi on 2 September 2017. The film was an official selection in the Un Certain Regard section at 2016 Cannes Film Festival.

==== Jury Member ====
Murtaza Ali Khan served as the member of the jury for 1st FISFA – International Film and Arts Festival, alongside filmmaker Sagar Ballary, actress Bidita Bag and activist Dr. Satendra Singh, organized in partnership with 15th World Rural Health Conference (WRHC 2018) at India Habitat Centre, New Delhi from 26 to 29 April 2018.

== Personal life ==
Murtaza Ali Khan hails from a middle-class Muslim family based out of New Delhi. Losing his father at a very young age he was brought up single-handedly by his mother. As a child he spent most his leisure time playing table tennis and watching Formula One. He is a great admirer of Japanese filmmaker Akira Kurosawa, whereas Michael Schumacher is his favorite Formula One racing driver.
