= Krishna Yogeshvara =

Book by Sanjay Dixit

- Author: Sanjay Dixit
- Language: Indian English
- Publication place: India

Krishna Yogeshvara is the second part of Krishna trilogy written by Sanjay Dixit and was published by Bloomsbury India. Book is written around the life of Krishna, from abduction of Rukmini to laying down of arms by Arjuna in battle of Kurukshetra.

== Reception ==
Abhinav Agarwal, writing for The New Indian Express, had appreciated the book and commented that "readers will feel rewarded with this engaging, fast-paced, and thought-provoking." Saiswaroopa Iyer, reviewing for Daily Pioneer, called the book as "cultural narrative" and called it a "must read book" for lovers of Mahabharata, ancient history or India. According to her, Dixit has art of balancing the western storytelling craft and Indic storytelling craft. "Commercial aspects like pace, flow, twists," she wrote, "are well backed by Indic aspects of philosophy, detail and research."
