= Chandan Mitra =

Indian journalist and politician (1954–2021)

Member of Parliament, Rajya Sabha
- In office 27 August 2003 – 26 August 2009
- Constituency: Nominated
- In office 30 June 2010 – 29 June 2016
- Constituency: Madhya Pradesh

Personal details
- Born: 12 December 1954 Howrah, West Bengal, India
- Died: 1 September 2021 (aged 65) Delhi, India
- Party: All India Trinamool Congress (2018-2021)
- Other political affiliations: Bharatiya Janata Party (2010-2018)
- Spouse: Swati Mitra (1977-1999) Shobori Ganguli
- Children: 2 (Kushan Mitra, Shakya Mitra)
- Parent: Monindra Nath Mitra (father)
- Education: Delhi University (BA, MA); Magdalen College, Oxford (DPhil)
- Profession: Journalist

Chandan Mitra (Bengali: চন্দন মিত্র; 12 December 1954 – 1 September 2021) was an Indian journalist and politician who was the editor and managing director of The Pioneer newspaper in Delhi.

He was also a two-term member of the Rajya Sabha, the upper house of the Indian parliament, serving between 2003 and 2009 as a nominated member from the Bharatiya Janata Party (BJP), and between 2003 and 2009 as an elected member from the state of Madhya Pradesh, again from BJP. He quit BJP and joined the All India Trinamool Congress in 2018.

== Early life and education ==
Mitra was born on 12 December 1955 in Howrah, in the Indian state of West Bengal, to Dipali Mitra and Monindra Nath Mitra. He studied at La Martiniere Calcutta, where he was awarded the Founder's Gold Medal in 1971. He was a batchmate of Swapan Dasgupta and Paranjoy Guha Thakurta at La Martiniere, and all three went up to St. Stephen's College, Delhi University, together. At St. Stephen's, Mitra and Shashi Tharoor were to become great friends and Mitra even became campaign manager for Tharoor's successful campaign to become President of the college's student union. He later went on to become the President of the student union himself. Mitra received an MA and M.Phil in History at Delhi University as well. He also taught at Hansraj College.

In 1984, he earned a Doctor of Philosophy from Magdalen College, Oxford, completing the thesis "Political mobilisation and the nationalism movement in India – a study of eastern Uttar Pradesh and Bihar, 1936-1942" written under supervision of the noted Indian historian Tapan Raychaudhuri.

== Career ==
Mitra started his career in journalism as an Assistant Editor with The Statesman in Kolkata before moving on to The Times of India in Delhi and later to The Sunday Observer where he went on to become the Editor of the newspaper. He later moved to the Hindustan Times as an Executive Editor. Mitra left to join The Pioneer as Editor, and eventually bought control of the newspaper from the Thapar family in 1998 when industrialist L. M. Thapar decided to exit the business.

He headed the newspaper for 24 years before stepping down in June 2021. During his time as an editor he focused his attention on topics including climate change, education, cultural heritage, as well as rural and urban development. He was also an advocate for the soft power of Bollywood, the Indian film industry, and was amongst the first to dedicate space to discussions linked to the industry in a mainstream newspaper.

Mitra was a supporter of left-wing politics in his student years. However, he shifted his interests to right-leaning ideologies later in his life. He was considered close to L. K. Advani, former Indian Deputy Prime Minister, from the Bharatiya Janata Party (BJP). He was nominated to Rajya Sabha, the upper house of the Indian parliament, from the BJP in 2003 and served his first term through 2009. He was elected for his second term to the Rajya Sabha as a member from the Indian state of Madhya Pradesh in 2010 and served the term through 2016. During his stint as a member of the parliament, some of the topics raised by Mitra included the creation of wildlife corridors while consideration of highway construction projects through national parks, specifically tiger and elephant reserves. He quit the Bharatiya Janata Party in 2018 and joined the All India Trinamool Congress, the ruling party of the Indian state of West Bengal.

== Personal life ==
Mitra was married to Shobori Ganguly. He had two sons Kushan and Shakya from an earlier marriage to Swati Mitra. He was an avid food-lover and was considered an authority on Indian film music and on Rabindra Sangeet. Mitra died on 1 September 2021 at the age of 65 at his home in Sainik Farm, in Delhi. Multiple journalists praised his work shaping the careers of young colleagues.
