= The Pioneer (India) =

Indian English-language daily newspaper founded in 1865

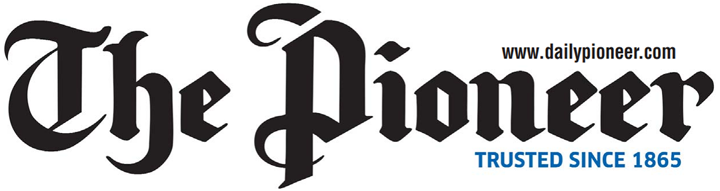

- Front page of The Pioneer
- Type: Daily newspaper
- Format: Broadsheet
- Owner(s): Sanchar Holdings (57%); IDBI Bank; ICICI Bank; Rainbow Productions; Starlink Group of Chennai
- Founder: Sir George Allen
- Publisher: CMYK Printech Ltd.
- Editor-in-chief: Shobori Ganguli (as of December 2024)
- Founded: 2 January 1865; 161 years ago
- Language: English and Hindi
- Headquarters: New Delhi, India
- Country: India
- Circulation: 2,30,000
- Sister newspapers: Swatantra Bharat (Hindi, estd. 1947)
- OCLC number: 18154497
- Website: www.dailypioneer.com

The Pioneer is an English-language daily newspaper published in India, first issued on 2 January 1865 in Allahabad (now Prayagraj), Uttar Pradesh. It is the second-oldest English-language newspaper in India still in circulation, after The Times of India. Founded by Sir George Allen as the first British-owned and British-edited newspaper in northern India, it is the only newspaper in India to have had two Nobel Prize in Literature laureates on its staff: Rudyard Kipling, who served as assistant editor (1887–1889), and Winston Churchill, who was its war correspondent on the North-West Frontier in 1897.

In addition, George Orwell — author of Animal Farm (1945) and Nineteen Eighty-Four (1949) — was invited to work on The Pioneer in 1937 but was prevented from accepting by failing health. Editor Desmond Young (1933–1940), who issued that invitation, later wrote Rommel: The Desert Fox (1950), one of the most widely read military biographies of the twentieth century.

At the paper's centenary celebrations in 1964, President S. Radhakrishnan said that The Pioneer was the only newspaper in India associated with two Nobel Laureates in Literature — Rudyard Kipling (1907) and Winston Churchill (1953) — and that its tradition was "worth emulation."

Today The Pioneer is published simultaneously from ten cities across India, with eight English editions and four Hindi editions. It was the first national Indian newspaper to introduce colour editions and a separate Sunday edition. Its Hindi-language sister publication, Swatantra Bharat, has been published simultaneously since 15 August 1947.

== History ==
=== Founding and early years (1865–1872) ===
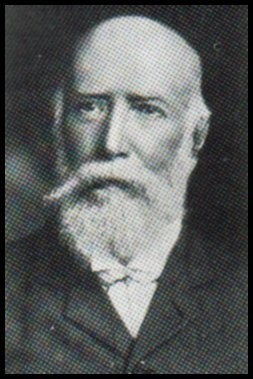
Alfred Percy Sinnett, editor of The Pioneer 1872–1888, described it as "the ablest and most influential" paper in the Indian interior

The founding of The Pioneer came at a decisive moment in Indian history. The Rebellion of 1857 had resulted in the formal dissolution of the East India Company and the assumption of direct Crown rule under Queen Victoria. Allahabad, already a major administrative centre, became even more significant as the seat of the new North-Western Provinces government, and the British garrison and civilian population in its cantonment grew rapidly.

George Allen, an Englishman who had built a successful tea business in north-east India, identified a clear commercial need: the British population of north India's cantonment towns needed a newspaper of their own. The wait for The Times of London, arriving by ship and then by train, was far too long for a literate population hungry for news. On 2 January 1865, Allen launched The Pioneer in Allahabad, serving simultaneously as its sole manager, editor-in-chief, and distributor. It was the first British-owned and British-edited newspaper in northern India.

The paper's first editor was Rev. Julian Robinson (1865–1872). From the outset it cultivated a reputation for literary quality and fine writing. The Pioneer was published three times a week until 1869, then daily. In 1866 a weekly supplement called the Pioneer Mail was added — 48 quarto-sized pages of advertising and social notices. By 1874, this had grown into the Pioneer Mail and India Weekly News, which also carried short stories and travel writing.

=== The Sinnett era (1872–1888) ===
In 1872, Alfred Percy Sinnett — who had previously edited the Daily Press in Hong Kong — became editor and transformed The Pioneer into one of the most influential newspapers in British India. It was described at the time as "the ablest and most influential of all Indian newspapers published in the interior of the country."

Sinnett became involved in Theosophy after meeting Helena Blavatsky and Henry Steel Olcott in 1879, when they visited his home in Shimla. He and his wife Patience joined the Theosophical Society, and the publicity given to Theosophy in the columns of The Pioneer was a significant factor in the movement's early growth — but ultimately cost Sinnett his position as editor.

Under Sinnett and his successors, The Pioneer established a defining tradition of editorial independence. Its most celebrated confrontation was with Lord Curzon, Viceroy of India from 1899 to 1905. After The Pioneer criticised Curzon and compared him unfavourably with Kaiser Wilhelm, Curzon instituted a Press Bureau designed specifically to deprive the paper of its monopoly on official news. Neither the Viceroy's displeasure nor official sanctions succeeded in browbeating The Pioneer into submission.

=== Rudyard Kipling (1887–1889) ===
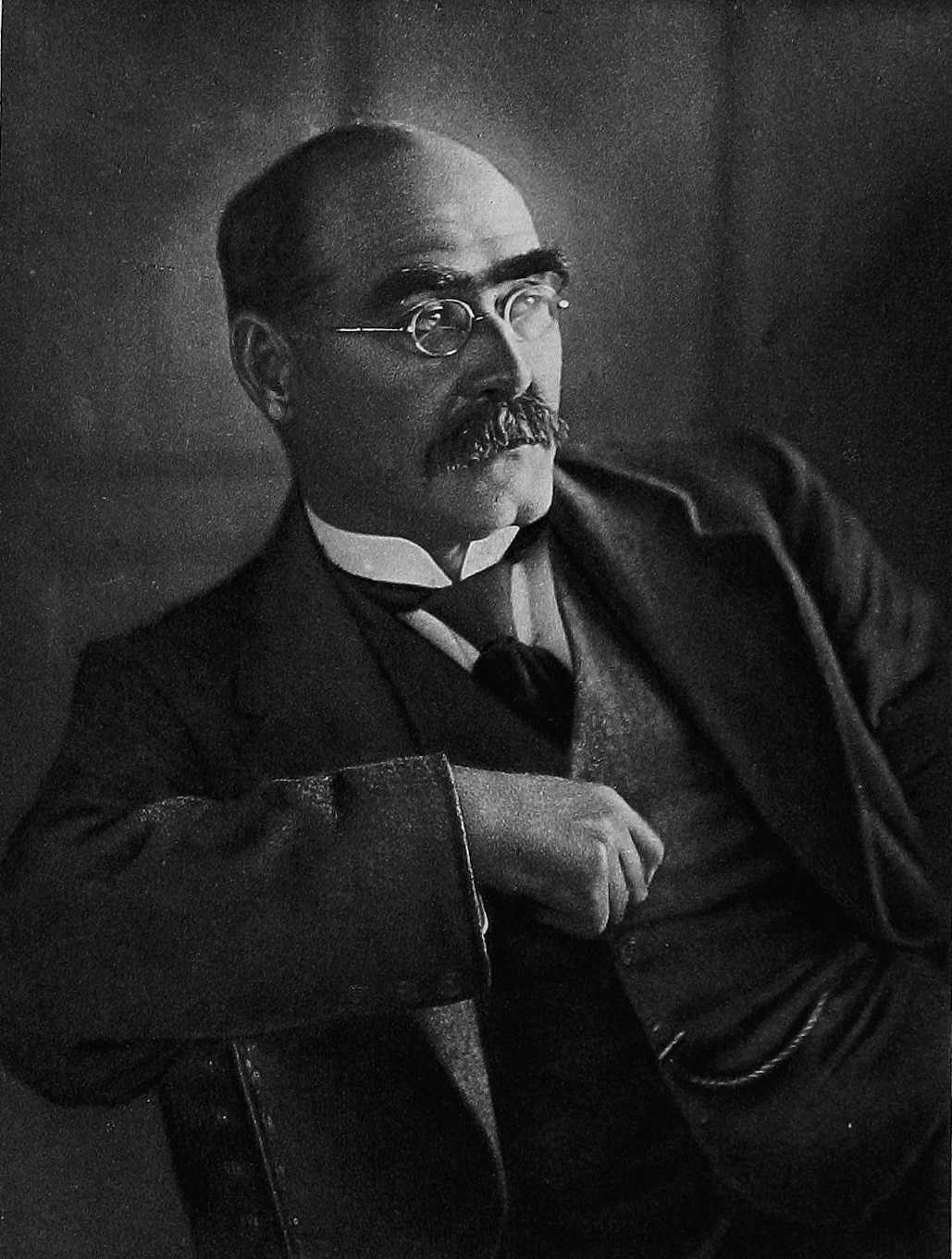
Rudyard Kipling worked at The Pioneer from 1887 to 1889, describing it as "the leading paper in India"

The Pioneer's most celebrated contributor arrived in November 1887, when Rudyard Kipling (1865–1936), aged 22, was transferred from The Pioneer's sister publication the Civil and Military Gazette in Lahore to the Allahabad office as assistant editor. Kipling had been at the Gazette since 1882; The Pioneer was a far larger and more influential paper, and the posting represented both a promotion and an immensely broader stage.

At The Pioneer, Kipling was given far greater creative freedom. During his time there from November 1887 to March 1889, he wrote at a remarkable pace. In 1888 alone he published six collections of short stories — Soldiers Three, The Story of the Gadsbys, In Black and White, Under the Deodars, The Phantom 'Rickshaw, and Wee Willie Winkie — comprising 41 stories in total. As The Pioneer's special correspondent in Rajputana, he also wrote many sketches later collected in Letters of Marque, published in From Sea to Sea and Other Sketches.

Kipling later described The Pioneer as "the leading paper in India" and elsewhere as "India's greatest and most important paper." Much of his finest early work was produced at The Pioneer; unpublished verses, sketches, and stories are believed to remain in its back files.

Kipling was discharged from The Pioneer in early 1889 following a dispute. He sold the rights to his six short-story volumes for £200, received six months' salary in lieu of notice, and used the proceeds to travel to London via Japan and America. In a celebrated irony, the paper's manager told him at his farewell: "Well, the best of luck, Kipling. But take my tip. Try some other career. You will never make much of a success with your pen." Kipling went on to publish The Jungle Book (1894) and in 1907 became the first English-language writer and the first journalist to receive the Nobel Prize in Literature. He later wrote in Something of Myself that when The Pioneer eventually "fell on evil days and was sold to a syndicate... I felt curiously alone and unsponsored."

=== Winston Churchill as war correspondent (1897–1898) ===
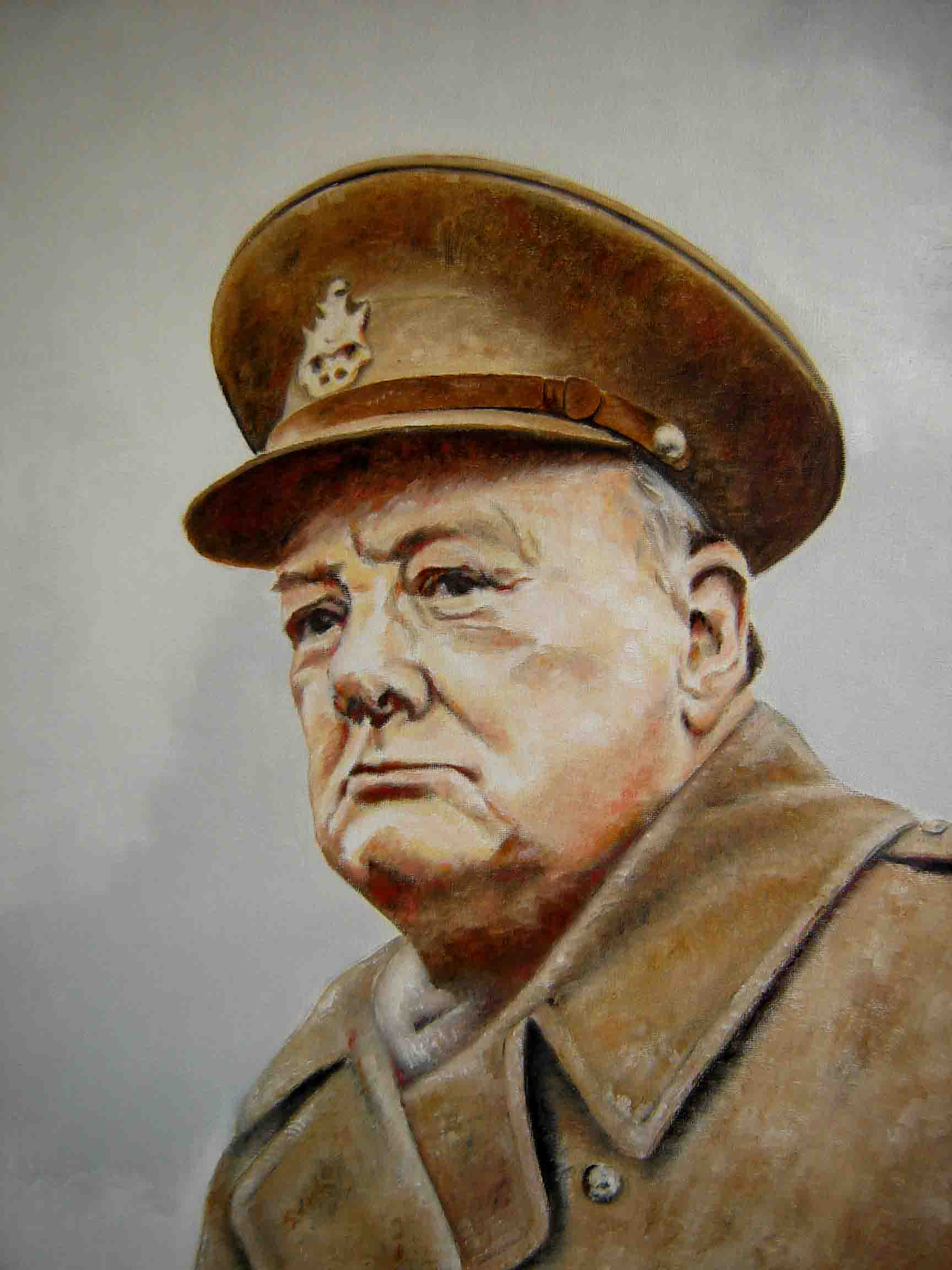
Winston Churchill, c. 1895. His dispatches to The Pioneer from the North-West Frontier formed the basis of his first book

Lieutenant Winston Churchill — later twice Prime Minister of the United Kingdom and a Nobel Prize in Literature laureate (1953) — served as The Pioneer's war correspondent during the Tirah Campaign of 1897–1898, filing dispatches from Fort Lockhart on the North-West Frontier.

Churchill's dispatches, published in both The Pioneer (specifically the Pioneer Mail) and The Daily Telegraph, were collected and expanded into his first book, The Story of the Malakand Field Force (1898, Longmans, Green & Co.), which attracted wide public attention and launched his literary career. Of the book's publication, Churchill wrote: "It will certainly be the most noteworthy act of my life. Up to date (of course). By its reception I shall measure the chances of my possible success in the world." Churchill went on to win the Nobel Prize in Literature in 1953. At The Pioneer's centenary in 1964, President S. Radhakrishnan noted that the paper was unique in Indian press history in being associated with two Nobel Literature Laureates — Kipling (1907) and Churchill (1953).

=== George Orwell and the editorship invitation (1937–1938) ===
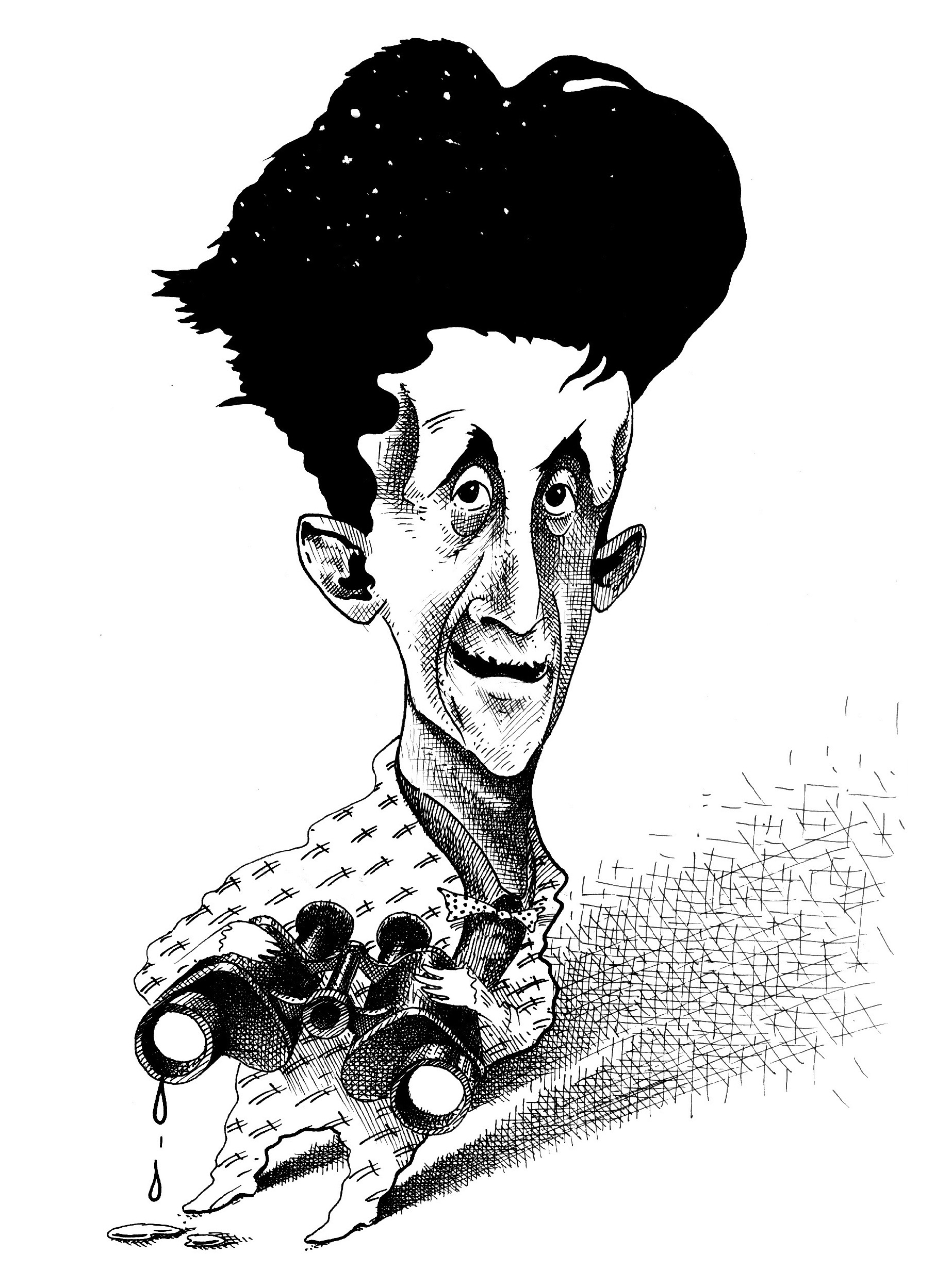
George Orwell, author of Animal Farm and Nineteen Eighty-Four, was invited to join The Pioneer in 1937 but ill health prevented him from accepting

In November 1937, Desmond Young, then editor of The Pioneer, invited George Orwell — freshly returned from the Spanish Civil War and author of The Road to Wigan Pier (1937) — to come to Lucknow to work as a leader writer on the paper. Orwell was drawn to the prospect: he had been born in Motihari, Bihar, in 1903 and had served in the Burmase Imperial Police until 1927; he wished to return to the subcontinent to gather material on Indian independence, a subject that preoccupied him throughout the late 1930s.

However, by March 1938, Orwell's health had deteriorated severely. He was admitted to Preston Hall Sanatorium at Aylesford, Kent, and was diagnosed with tuberculosis, making it impossible for him to take up the position. He went on to write Animal Farm (1945) and Nineteen Eighty-Four (1949), two of the most widely read novels of the twentieth century. Had he joined The Pioneer, Orwell would have worked at the same paper that had employed Kipling and Churchill, making it arguably the most literarily distinguished newspaper in the history of British India — with three of the century's most enduring English writers connected to it within the space of fifty years.

=== Desmond Young: editor and biographer (1933–1940) ===
Desmond Young served as editor of The Pioneer from 1933 to 1940, a tenure that was remarkable both for what he achieved at the paper and for what he went on to do after leaving it. Young planned and executed The Pioneer's historic relocation from Allahabad to Lucknow in 1933 (see below), invited George Orwell to join the paper in 1937, and oversaw the construction of its new Lucknow building.

At the outbreak of World War II, Young left his deputy in the editor's chair and enlisted in the British Indian Army, eventually serving in North Africa as a Brigadier. He was captured by Erwin Rommel's forces in the Western Desert and spent time as a prisoner of war. His post-war experiences became the foundation of Rommel: The Desert Fox (1950), the first full biography of Rommel, which went through eight editions in its first year and was translated into many languages. The book was adapted into the 1951 film The Desert Fox: The Story of Rommel starring James Mason.

=== Move to Lucknow (1933) ===
In July 1933, after 68 years in Allahabad — where it had been a central institution of British and then Indian public life — The Pioneer relocated to Lucknow. The move was partly driven by the desire to escape stiff competition from The Leader, which had become more popular in Allahabad, and partly by the shift of political power in Uttar Pradesh to Lucknow.

The relocation, planned and executed by editor Desmond Young, became a celebrated feat of logistics: approximately 500 tons of machinery and a staff of about 250 people were transported 140 miles from Allahabad to Lucknow without missing a single issue of publication, at the time described as a record for the newspaper world. The Pioneer Mail and India Weekly News, the paper's long-running weekly supplement, ceased publication simultaneously. The foundation stone of the new Lucknow building was laid by the Marquess of Linlithgow, then Viceroy of India, on 16 December 1936.

=== The first Indian editor and Independence (1946–1947) ===
Dr. S.N. Ghosh (20 May 1904 – 9 August 1995) joined The Pioneer as an apprentice on 1 August 1927 and spent nearly five decades at the paper. When he became editor in 1946, he was the first Indian to hold that position — a symbolic and substantive turning point in the paper's identity. Sarojini Naidu, the first Governor of Uttar Pradesh after independence, wrote to the paper on 22 April 1948 praising its "independence of views", its "complete freedom from communal bias and a sense of perspective during times of crises" — a tribute that reflected the editorial standards Ghosh had established.

On 15 August 1947, The Pioneer marked Indian independence with a landmark front page under the banner headline: "Freedom Era Begins — End of British Rule in India: Historic Midnight Delhi Ceremony Rings in Independence for the Nation." On the same day, it launched its Hindi-language sister publication Swatantra Bharat simultaneously from Lucknow and Varanasi, as an Independence Day gift to the newly independent nation.

In 1951, under Ghosh's editorship, The Pioneer was selected as one of three Indian newspapers to represent the World Press on a US Government-sponsored tour of the United States — a recognition of its international standing. Ghosh served as editor until 1972, making him the longest-serving editor in the paper's history, and maintained his association with The Pioneer for nearly fifty years until his death in 1995.

=== Jaipuria ownership and modernisation (1958–1990) ===
In 1958, The Pioneer was acquired by the House of Jaipurias — an Indian industrial family originally from Rajasthan, based in Calcutta, with interests in cotton textiles, coal mines, sugar, and synthetic fibre. The acquisition was brokered at the urging of Dr. Sampurnanand, then Chief Minister of Uttar Pradesh, who was concerned the paper might close due to severe financial difficulties.

The new owners undertook a comprehensive modernisation: obsolete machinery was replaced, fully computerised typesetting was introduced, the network of correspondents was expanded, and the paper was given a modern design and format. A Varanasi edition was launched in 1984, followed by expansion to Kanpur and Moradabad. The family also established a Security Printing Division, equipped with machinery imported from West Germany and Italy, for the production of lottery tickets, cheques, and other security documents.

In 1983, The Pioneer received the Population Action Council Award for Media Excellence (Washington, D.C.), recognising it as the best developing-world daily newspaper for its coverage of population and development issues. Managing Editor Shishir Jaipuria accepted the award in Washington, D.C.

=== Centenary celebrations (1964) ===
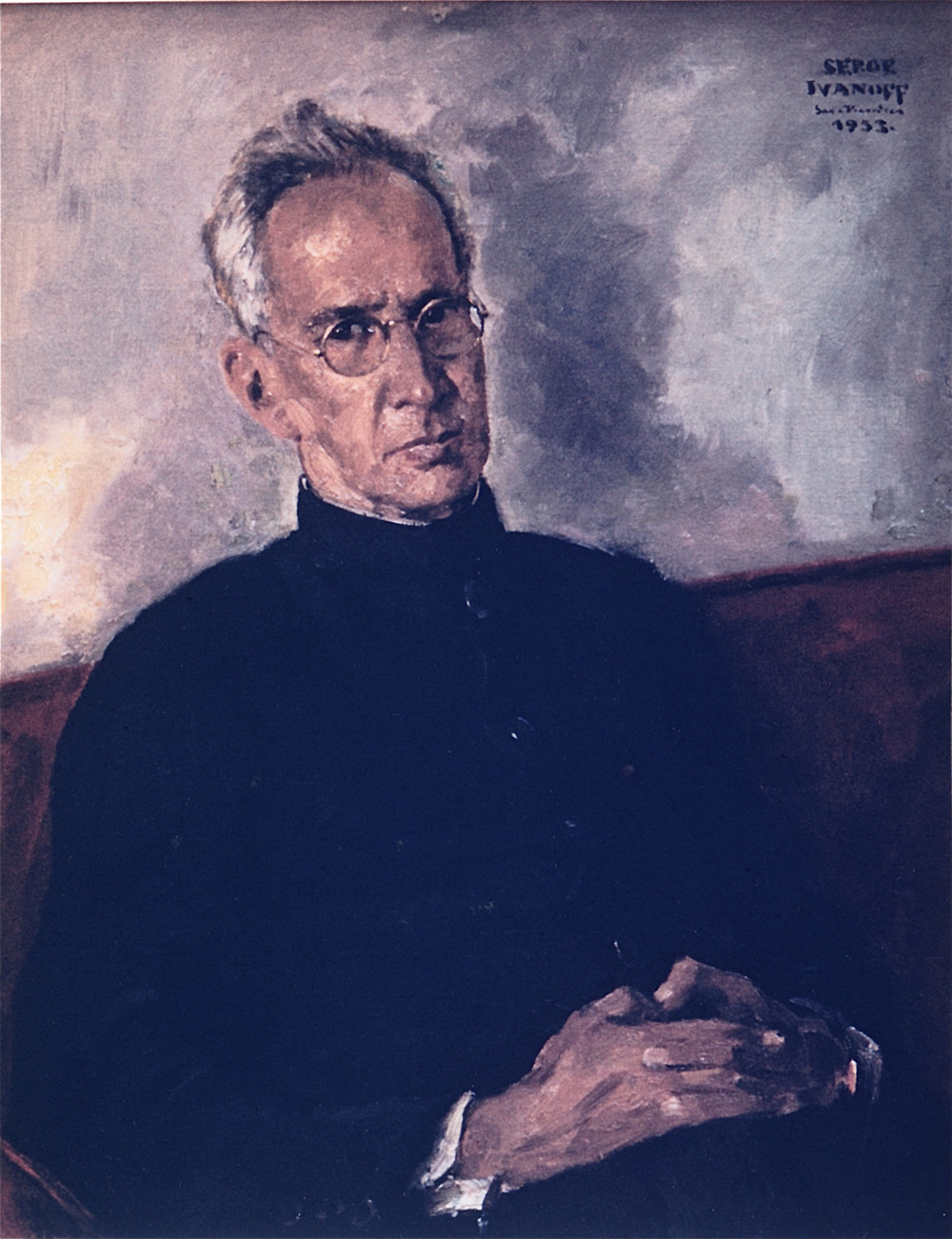
President S. Radhakrishnan, who attended The Pioneer's centenary celebrations in 1964 and praised its association with two Nobel Literature Laureates

The Pioneer's centenary was celebrated on the weekend of 20 November 1964 in Lucknow, attended by many of the most prominent figures in Indian and international public life. The grounds and building of the newspaper were decorated with welcoming arches, shamiyanas, and coloured lights.

Among those present were President Dr. S. Radhakrishnan; Prime Minister Lal Bahadur Shastri; Lord Thomson of Fleet, whose newspaper chain was then the largest in the United Kingdom and who represented the Commonwealth Press Union; Sir Timothy Bligh, the Thomson Organisation's Director of Overseas Development; the US Embassy Minister Counsellor Joseph N. Greene; Uttar Pradesh Governor Biswanath Das; Chief Minister Sucheta Kripalani; Chief Justice of the Allahabad High Court M.C. Desai; Lucknow University Vice-Chancellor A.N. Rao; and economist Radha Kamal Mukerjee.

The BBC broadcast a special half-hour programme to mark the occasion, tracing the history of the Indian press. Prime Minister Shastri described it as "a happy day for The Pioneer which has attained one hundred years of age today." President Radhakrishnan, in his address, referred to the long list of distinguished editors — English and Indian — who had served The Pioneer, noted its unique distinction of having been associated with two Nobel Literature Laureates, and said its tradition was "worth emulation."

=== National expansion under the Thapar Group (1990–1998) ===
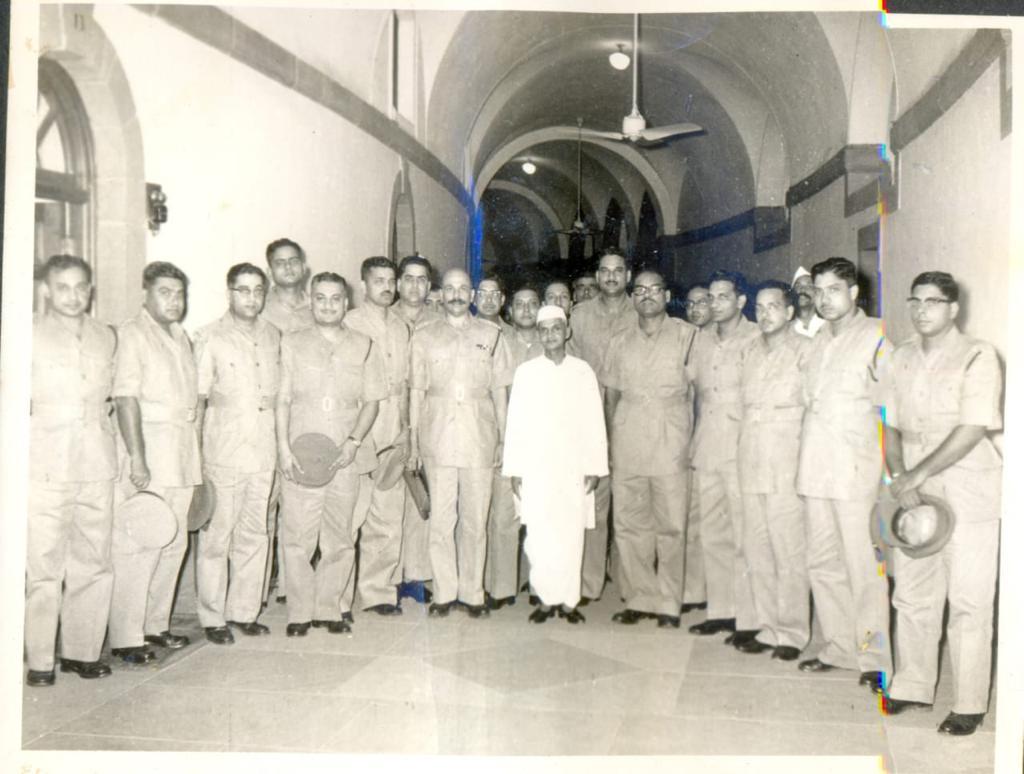
Prime Minister Lal Bahadur Shastri, who attended the 1964 centenary and called it "a happy day for The Pioneer"

The Pioneer remained primarily a Lucknow-based paper until 1990–91, when it was purchased by the Thapar Group under industrialist L. M. Thapar, who transformed it into a genuinely national newspaper for the first time, publishing it from Delhi, Lucknow, Bhubaneswar, Kochi, Bhopal, Chandigarh, Dehradun, and Ranchi. A Delhi edition was launched in December 1991 under the editorship of Vinod Mehta, one of India's most prominent journalists.

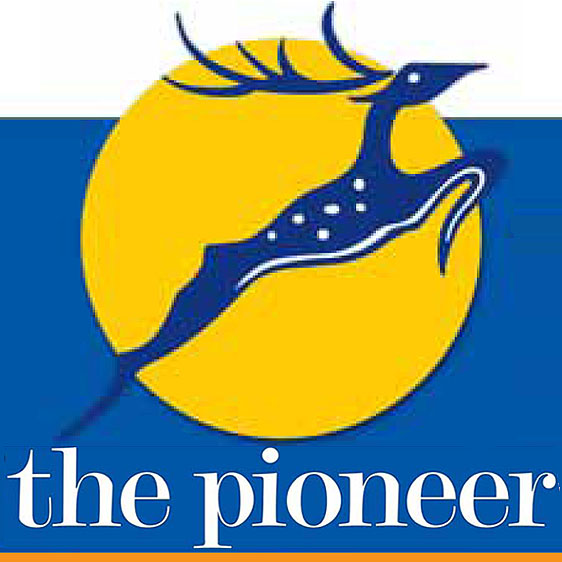
The Pioneer's logo (1998–2021)

Thapar sold the paper to its editor Chandan Mitra in 1998; at that time the paper had 484 employees. Mitra announced he intended to seek further investors rather than remain the sole owner.

=== The Mitra era (1998–2021) ===
Chandan Mitra (12 December 1954 – 1 September 2021) was educated at La Martiniere in Kolkata, St Stephen's College Delhi — where he and Shashi Tharoor became close friends and he served as campaign manager for Tharoor's successful run for college student union president — and Magdalen College, Oxford, where he completed a DPhil in history in 1984. Before joining The Pioneer he had worked at The Statesman, The Times of India, The Sunday Observer, and the Hindustan Times, where he was Executive Editor.

Under Mitra's ownership and editorship, The Pioneer was described as having been transformed "from a publication facing closure into a national newspaper known for its bold editorials." It developed a distinctive centre-right editorial identity, becoming one of the few major national papers to articulate a conservative viewpoint, and was known for its investigative reporting including on the 2G spectrum scam. Mitra was nominated to the Rajya Sabha by the BJP in 2003 and served until 2009; he was re-elected from Madhya Pradesh in 2010 and served until 2016. He left the BJP in 2018 and joined the All India Trinamool Congress.

Mitra was married to Shobori Ganguly, who is also a journalist and became editor of The Pioneer in December 2024. He died on 1 September 2021 at his home in Sainik Farm, Delhi, at the age of 66, after a prolonged illness. Prime Minister Narendra Modi said he "will be remembered for his intellect and insights" and that he had "distinguished himself in the world of media as well as politics."

=== Recent history (2021–present) ===
After Chandan Mitra's departure from the newspaper’s leadership in June 2021, The Pioneer entered a period of organisational transition and restructuring.

During this period, certain corporate and legal matters involving an entity associated with the newspaper came before the Delhi National Company Law Tribunal (NCLT) in 2021. These proceedings formed part of a broader phase of institutional challenges and subsequent efforts to stabilise the publication.

Kushan Mitra, Chandan Mitra's son and himself a journalist, subsequently worked to revive the newspaper, and restore its operations. He announced at his father's memorial lecture that The Pioneer was "back up and running after several years of legal struggle."

The newspaper subsequently continued its editorial and organisational development, maintaining its presence in India’s English-language print media landscape. In 2025, Deepak Kumar Jha assumed charge as Executive Editor.

On 17 October 2010, The Pioneer had launched a Hindi edition from Lucknow. In May 2012, a Raipur bureau was inaugurated, beginning the Chhattisgarh edition.

== Notable contributors ==
=== Rudyard Kipling ===
Rudyard Kipling (1865–1936) worked at The Pioneer's Allahabad office as assistant editor from November 1887 to March 1889. During this period he published six collections of short stories (41 stories in total) in a single year, reported as a special correspondent from Rajputana, and laid the foundations of his literary reputation. He described The Pioneer as "the leading paper in India." In 1907, he became the first English-language writer and the first journalist to receive the Nobel Prize in Literature.

=== Winston Churchill ===
Winston Churchill served as The Pioneer's war correspondent in 1897–1898. His dispatches to the Pioneer Mail and The Daily Telegraph from the Tirah Campaign formed the basis of his first book, The Story of the Malakand Field Force (1898). Churchill was awarded the Nobel Prize in Literature in 1953, making The Pioneer the only newspaper in Indian history to have employed two Nobel Literature Laureates.

=== George Orwell ===
George Orwell (1903–1950) was invited to join The Pioneer in Lucknow in November 1937 by editor Desmond Young, to work as a leader writer. Orwell, who was born in Motihari, Bihar, and had served in the Burmese Imperial Police (1922–1927), was drawn to the prospect of returning to the subcontinent. Tuberculosis in early 1938 prevented him from accepting the offer. He went on to write Animal Farm (1945) and Nineteen Eighty-Four (1949).

=== Desmond Young ===
Desmond Young edited The Pioneer from 1933 to 1940. He executed the paper's record-breaking 1933 relocation from Allahabad to Lucknow, invited George Orwell to join the paper, and oversaw the building of the paper's new Lucknow headquarters. Leaving the paper for active service in World War II, he served as a Brigadier in North Africa, was captured by Rommel's forces, and later wrote Rommel: The Desert Fox (1950), one of the bestselling military biographies of the twentieth century, which was adapted into a Hollywood film starring James Mason in 1951.

=== S.N. Ghosh — first Indian editor ===
Dr. S.N. Ghosh (1904–1995) joined The Pioneer as an apprentice in 1927 and became its first Indian editor in 1946, serving until 1972 — the paper's longest editorship. Under his leadership the paper earned the praise of Governor Sarojini Naidu for its independence and freedom from communal bias. In 1951, he was selected as one of three Indian editors to represent the World Press on a US Government tour.

=== Chandan Mitra ===
Chandan Mitra (1954–2021) edited The Pioneer from 1996 to 2021, and from 1998 was its owner, having purchased the paper from the Thapar Group when it was facing closure. Under his stewardship the paper became a national voice known for bold editorials and investigative reporting. A DPhil in history from Oxford University, he was also a two-term Rajya Sabha member (2003–2009 and 2010–2016). He is widely credited with having saved The Pioneer from extinction.

=== Other notable contributors ===
- Alfred Percy Sinnett — editor 1872–1888; leading Theosophist
- Vinod Mehta — editor 1991–1994; launched Delhi national edition
- Balbir Punj — political commentator
- K G Suresh — journalist
- KPS Gill — columnist; former Director General of Punjab Police

=== Cartoonists ===
- Sudhir Dar
- Shekhar Gurera
- Irfan Hussain
- R.C. Banerjee (1865–1989)

== Awards and recognition ==
- In 1951, under Dr. S.N. Ghosh's editorship, The Pioneer was selected as one of three Indian newspapers to represent the World Press on a US Government-sponsored tour of the United States.
- In 1983, The Pioneer received the Population Action Council Award for Media Excellence (Washington, D.C.), recognising it as the best developing-world daily newspaper for its coverage of population and development issues.
- In 1964, at the paper's centenary, President S. Radhakrishnan described The Pioneer as the only newspaper in India associated with two Nobel Laureates in Literature — Rudyard Kipling (1907) and Winston Churchill (1953).

== Firsts ==
- First British-owned and British-edited newspaper in northern India (1865)
- First national Indian newspaper to introduce colour editions
- First national Indian newspaper to introduce a separate Sunday edition
- Only newspaper in India associated with two Nobel Prize in Literature laureates — Kipling (1907) and Churchill (1953)
- The only newspaper whose editor (Desmond Young, 1933–1940) subsequently wrote one of the bestselling military biographies of the twentieth century (Rommel: The Desert Fox, 1950)

== Editions ==
The Pioneer is published simultaneously from the following cities:

- Bhopal
- Bhubaneswar
- Chandigarh
- Delhi
- Dehradun
- Hyderabad
- Lucknow
- Raipur
- Ranchi
- Trivandrum
- Vijayawada

The Lucknow edition encompasses four sub-editions covering Varanasi, Kanpur, Allahabad, and Lucknow itself.

== Editors ==
Editor	Tenure	Notes
Rev. Julian Robinson	1865–1872	First editor; paper founded as a thrice-weekly publication
A.P. Sinnett	1872–1888	Transformed paper into a major influence; later a leading Theosophist; co-authored The Mahatma Letters
Sir George Maclagan Chesney	1888–1915	
Maitland Park	January–March 1915	
Clive Rattigan	1915–1920	
John Evans Wollacott	1920–1926	
Edwin Haward	1926–1929	
F.W. Wilson	1929–1931	
J.S. Thornley	1931–1932	
H.W. Wouters	1932–1933	
Desmond Young	1933–1940	Executed the record Allahabad–Lucknow relocation (1933); invited George Orwell to join the paper (1937); later wrote Rommel: The Desert Fox (1950)
H.E.B. Catley	1941–1945	
Dr. S.N. Ghosh	1946–1972	First Indian editor; longest-serving editor; represented Indian press at US World Press tour (1951); joined paper as apprentice in 1927
Dr. K.P. Agarwal	1973–1983	Managing Editor
Amalendu Ghosh	February–September 1983	
R.D. Kwatra	1983–1985	
Adarsh Kumar Verma	1985–1986	
Somnath Sapru	1986–1991	
Vinod Mehta	1991–1994	Launched Delhi national edition (December 1991)
A.K. Bhattachree	1994–1996	
Ajoy Bose	January–February 1996	Acting editor
Chandan Mitra	1996–2021	Purchased paper from Thapar Group in 1998; Rajya Sabha member 2003–2009 and 2010–2016; died 1 September 2021; married to Shobori Ganguly
Shobori Ganguli	December 2024–present	Married to the late Chandan Mitra

== See also ==
- The Times of India
- Hindustan Times
- The Hindu
- Indian Express
- Civil and Military Gazette — The Pioneer's Lahore sister publication, where Kipling worked 1882–1887
- Rudyard Kipling
- Winston Churchill
- George Orwell
- Desmond Young
- Rommel: The Desert Fox
- Chandan Mitra
