= Kanoria foundation =

Victims' organization in India

- Formation: 2014
- Type: Trust
- Legal status: Foundation
- Headquarters: Kolkata
- Location: Kolkata, India
- Key people: H. P. Kanoria (Chairman); Hemant Kanoria (Trustee); Sunil Kanoria (Trustee)
- Website: https://kanoriafoundation.co.in/

Kanoria foundation is a trust organisation headquartered in Kolkata, India. It was founded in 2014. The foundation actively supports various social initiatives, including sponsoring students' education, organising spiritual conferences, and assisting survivors of acid attacks.

== Acid Survivors and Women Welfare Foundation (ASWWF) ==
Acid Survivors and Women Welfare Foundation (ASWWF) is a non-governmental organisation (NGO) formed and managed by the Kanoria foundation to support and promote the welfare of acid attack survivors. The foundation provides financial assistance to survivors for medical treatment and their overall rehabilitation.

ASWWF has expanded its operations to Odisha and Bihar to ensure that women affected by acid attacks receive advocacy, financial support, and assistance with rehabilitation.

== Education initiatives ==
The Kanoria foundation has established Srihari Global School, Asansol, with the aim of providing holistic development of children — enriching the body, mind, and soul. The school follows a pedagogical approach to teaching and is affiliated with the Central Board of Secondary Education (CBSE).

Approximately 700 underprivileged students benefit from scholarships, free meals, and education provided by Sarvodaya schools, which have been established by the Kanoria foundation to support the weaker sections of society. These two Sarvodaya schools are affiliated with the West Bengal Board of Secondary Education.

== Universal Spirituality and Humanity Foundation ==
The Universal Spirituality and Humanity Foundation, an initiative of the Kanoria foundation, has been organising the World Confluence of Humanity, Power and Spirituality over the years. The event brings together eminent speakers from around the world to share their views on humanity and spirituality.

Distinguished personalities such as the late Dr A. P. J. Abdul Kalam, former President of India, and the late Pranab Mukherjee, former President of India, have attended the confluence. The event has also received commendations from Shri Narendra Modi, Hon’ble Prime Minister of India; Shri Ram Nath Kovind, Hon’ble President of India; and Shri M. Venkaiah Naidu, Hon’ble Vice President of India.
