= New Delhi Institute of Management =

Business school in India

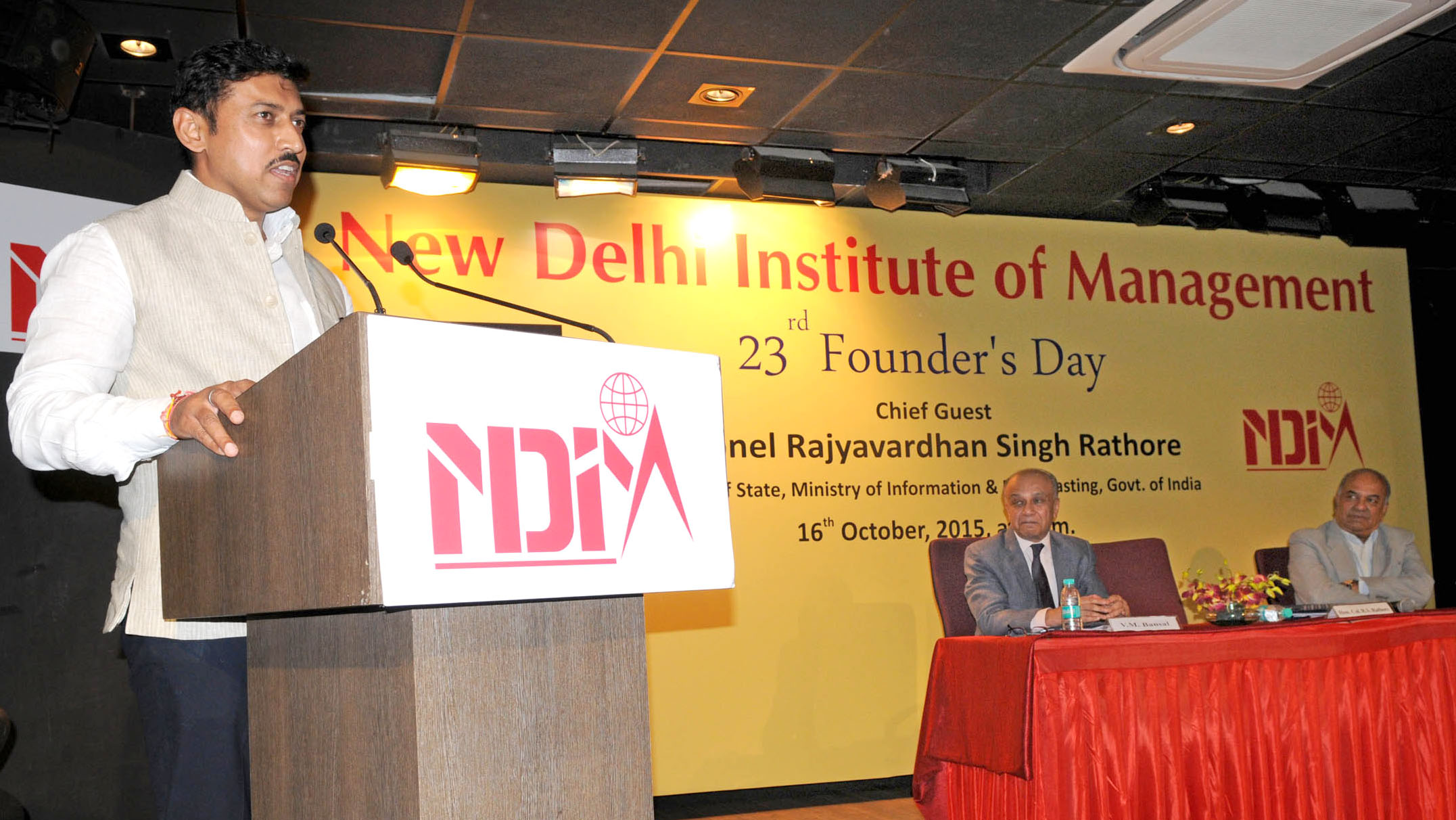
- The Minister of State for Information & Broadcasting, Col. Rajyavardhan Singh Rathore addressing at the 23rd Foundation Day of New Delhi Institute of Management (NDIM), in New Delhi on October 16, 2015
- Motto: Nurturing Business Leaders Since 1992
- Type: Education & Semi Private
- Established: 1992
- Founder: J. R. Bansal
- Affiliations: AICTE & AIU
- Chairman: V. M. Bansal
- Director: Dr. Gauri Modwel
- Faculty: Dr. Manab Adhikary; Dr. A. T. K. Raman; S. C. Kuchal
- Location: Delhi, New Delhi, India
- Campus: Urban
- Nickname: NDIM
- Website: www.ndimdelhi.org

The New Delhi Institute of Management (NDIM) is a state not-for-profit business school in Tughlakabad, New Delhi. Established in 1992, NDIM offers AICTE-approved 2-year full-time PGDM. The PGDM at NDIM is approved by the AICTE since 1996, declared equivalent to MBA by the AICTE in 2008, and is internationally accredited by ASIC, The UK with Premier College Status. The Nearest metro station is at Saket, Govindpuri, and GK-2.

== Programs ==
- Post Graduate Diploma in Management (PGDM)
- Post Graduate Diploma in Management-Marketing (PGDM Marketing)
- Post Graduate Diploma in Management-Finance (PGDM Finance)
- MBA with Dual Specialization in HR, Marketing, Finance, IT & Systems, Media Marketing & Communication, Digital Marketing, Business Analytics, Logistics-Supply Chain Management & Operations, International Business.

== Rankings and accreditation ==
NDIM was awarded by the AICTE-CII two years in a row (2017 & 2018) as the Best Industry Linked Management Institute of India.

The PGDM at NDIM is declared equivalent to MBA by the Association of Indian Universities (AIU) and accredited by the National Board of Accreditation (NBA). MBA at NDIM is internationally accredited by the International rating body, ASIC(UK), with Premier College Status. It is ranked amongst the Top 10 B-Schools and 7th amongst the Top Private B-Schools of India by Business World, June 2013. It is ranked as the 12th Best Private B-School in India and 3rd Best Private B-School in North India by AIMA-Business Standard, June 2015. NDIM's Industry Interface and Scale of Operations ranked as No.1 in India by AIMA-Business Standard, June 2015.

WCRC Leaders-Asia & KPMG ranked NDIM amongst the Fastest Growing B-Schools of Asia, January 2014.

== Board of Directors and Executive Council ==
NDIM Board is includes 7 former Chief Secretaries and Secretaries to the Govt. of India., eminent educationalists, industrialists, management consultants and former governors.

- Suresh Prabhu Union Minister of Commerce & Industry and Civil Aviation. Former Railway Minister of India
- T. K. A. Nair Secretary in the Prime Minister's Office
- S. P. Oswal Chairman & Managing Director of Vardhman Spinning & General Mills Ltd
- Tarlochan Singh MP, Rajya Sabha
- Padma shri Harshavardhan Neotia Chairman Ambuja Neotia Group
- Mahesh Gupta Chairman Kent RO Systems
- Sirajuddin Qureshi President, India Islamic Culture Centre
- [Tarun Vijay. MP Directorof the Dr. Syamaprasad Mookherjee Research Foundation, member of Rajya Sabha
- Hemant Kanoria Chairman, managing director of SERI Infrastructure Finance Ltd.
- Ashok Chandra IAS, Sec'y Govt. of India
- Major Gen. D.N. Khurana AVSM, Ex-Dir. General AIMA; Secretary General Asia Association of Management Associations
- I.K Rasgotra Sec'y Govt. of India (Retd.) Ministry of Personnel and Administrative Reforms
