= Delhi Institute of Heritage Research & Management =

Autonomous college in Delhi, India

- Type: Government Institute
- Affiliations: Guru Gobind Singh Indraprastha University
- Director: Amjad Tak
- Location: New Delhi, Delhi, India
- Campus: Qutub Institutional Area
- Website: dihrm.delhigovt.nic.in/

Delhi Institute of Heritage Research & Management (DIHRM), an autonomous college established by the Government of Delhi is affiliated with Guru Gobind Singh Indraprastha University and located in Qutub Institutional Area in New Delhi. Admission to DIHRM is through the Common Entrance Test (CET) conducted by Guru Gobind Singh Indraprastha University. The institute offers Master in Archaeology and Heritage Management and Master in Conservation, Preservation and Heritage Management courses.
