= K. G. Suresh =

Indian journalist (born 1968)

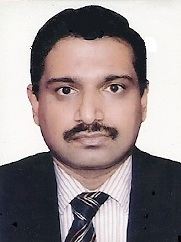

Personal details
- Born: 26 September 1968 (age 58)
- Education: University of Delhi; Bhartiya Vidya Bhawan; Kerala Education Society Senior Secondary School
- Occupation: Journalist

Prof. (Dr.) KG Suresh is a Academician, educationist, journalist and a political commentator. He currently serves as the director of India Habitat Centre.

Earlier, he had served as vice chancellor of Makhanlal Chaturvedi National University of Journalism & Communication, Bhopal and director general, Indian Institute of Mass Communication, founder dean, School of Modern Media, University of Petroleum & Energy Studies (UPES), Dehradun; senior fellow and editor with Delhi-based leading strategic think tank Vivekananda International Foundation.

He is also the founder president of the Global Media Education Council, the only India-driven international academic platform, and vice-president Indian Communication Congress.

In the industry, he has held leadership roles such as senior consulting editor with DD News, India's public broadcaster, editorial consultant with Asianet News Network, the leading satellite channel in Southern India; chief political correspondent with Press Trust of India, one the world's leading news agencies, and group media advisor to Dalmia Bharat Enterprises Ltd.

In his tenure at MCU included shifting the university to its three new campuses, implementation of National Education Policy 2020, Introduction of new Departments, Chairs, radio station, studio to courses, streamlining of academic activities including award of a record 36 PhDs and organisation of major events including National Short Film Festival and G20 University Connect; doubling of students and major enhancement of revenue generation.

As Director General of IIMC, he played pivotal role in the institute obtaining Deemed to be University status, establishment of permanent campuses in Jammu, Kerala, Mizoram and Maharashtra and launching of Indian language journalism programmes in Marathi, Malayalam, Sanstkrit, Hindi and Urdu besides initiatives such as Community Radio Empowerment Centre and National Media Faculty Development Centre.

He is a recipient of the prestigious Ganesh Shankar Vidyarthi Award for outstanding contribution to Journalism by the Kendriya Hindi Sansthan, Ministry of Education, Government of India. He was earlier designated Commonwealth Youth Ambassador for Peace by Commonwealth Youth Programme, Asia.

A TEDX Speaker & Henry Stewart Talks faculty, Prof Suresh had successfully completed an Experiential Course in Public Health Communication from the University of Oxford, United Kingdom.

He is a Member of University Grants Commission Expert Panels and Academic Councils and Boards of Studies of several universities and national institutions.

He has been on the jury of several prestigious awards and fellowships including UNAOC, National Film Awards, UNICEF India, Ramnath Goenka Awards, Laadli Media Awards, Press Council of India, MP State Awards, Election Commission of India and PRSI National Awards.

He has extensively travelled across India and the world including Afghanistan, Pakistan, China, Nepal, Sri Lanka, Indonesia, South Korea, Japan, United Kingdom, Switzerland, Austria, Hungary, Qatar, Mauritius, South Africa among others.

== Career ==
As DG, IIMC, Suresh gave a major push to Indian-language journalism at the institute, introducing Marathi and Malayalam journalism from its Amravati, Maharashtra and Kottayam, Kerala campus respectively, besides upgrading the certificate programme in Urdu at Delhi campus to a full-fledged postgraduate diploma programme. In collaboration with Shri Lal Bahadur Shastri Rashtriya Sanskrit Vidyapeeth, IIMC has now introduced a three-month Advanced Certificate Programme in Sanskrit journalism. He has also set up the Department of Indian Language Journalism apart from the Department of New Media.

His other major initiatives included the establishment of the Community Radio Empowerment & Resource Centre at IIMC with a view to promote Community Radio Stations in India and the National Media Faculty Development Centre for training and skill upgradation of media educators across India. He is also credited with reviving IIMC's peer-reviewed quarterly journal 'Communicator' and its Hindi version 'Sanchar Madhyam' as also the publication wing of the institute besides co-hosting the prestigious 15th Asia Media Summit in New Delhi & hosting the 17th Indian Science Communication Congress at IIMC in December 2017 and first ever inter-University youth festival 'Media Mahakumbh' at IIMC in Feb 2018.

In his time with Doordarshan News as Senior Consulting Editor, they introduced programs including Speed News, Vaartavali- The world's first Sanskrit Television News Magazine, Good News India – positive news from across the country, India First – A strategy and defence based program and 'Do Touk' – a political debating platform, besides DD's first android enabled Mobile App.

Serving PTI in different capacities for over a decade including as Chief Crime Reporter, Deputy Chief Reporter, Special Correspondent and Chief Political Correspondent, Suresh has travelled across India and the world to cover developments including the Royal Palace Massacre in Nepal, BJP leader L K Advani's controversial visit to Pakistan, the post Taliban situation in Afghanistan, the cyclone, earthquake and violence in Gujarat, militancy in Kashmir apart from Lok Sabha and State Assembly elections. He has also covered both Houses of Parliament extensively.

A media educator for the last two decades, Prof Suresh is visiting professor and course in charge for communication skills at the Special Centre for Disaster Research at Jawaharlal Nehru University, adjunct professor with the Academy of Scientific & Innovative Research, an institution of National Importance established by an act of Parliament. He has also served as adjunct professor at the Makhanlal Chaturvedi National University of Journalism and visiting professor with the Delhi Institute of Heritage Research & Management, run by Govt of NCT Delhi. He is a resource person for the Training Programmes at Indian Institute of Public Administration; Consortium for Educational Communication, UGC; Centre for Professional Development in Higher Education, University of Delhi; National Institute of Disaster Management, National Academy of Broadcasting and Multimedia (Prasar Bharati), Indira Gandhi National Forest Academy, Indian Aviation Academy & Research and Information System for Developing Countries (RIS), a think tank of the Ministry of External Affairs, Government of India. He is a visiting faculty at the Sardar Patel College of Communications & Management, Bharatiya Vidya Bhavan, New Delhi.

== Achievement ==
Suresh was designated Commonwealth Youth Ambassador for Peace by Commonwealth Youth Programme, Asia.

With a professional cross-media experience of about three decades, Suresh is the recipient of Prem Bhatia Fellowship for Research in Media by Young Journalists. A post-Graduate in Mass Communications, Mr Suresh successfully completed a Public Health Journalism Experiential Course at the University of Oxford, United Kingdom.

In December 2017, Prof Suresh was conferred with the PRSI Leadership Award, the highest Award for outstanding contribution to the Public Relations profession, at the 39th All India Public Relations Conference at Visakhapatnam, Andhra Pradesh. He has also been honoured with the Visionary Leader in Media Education Award instituted by Business World Magazine & Exchange4media in November 2018; the first Khwaja Gareeb Nawaz Award for Unity, Brotherhood & Communal Harmony & Lifetime Achievement Award for contribution in the field of Media Education by NISCORT Media School & Eureka Publications

In December 2017, Suresh was conferred with the PRSI Leadership Award, the highest Award for outstanding contribution to the Public Relations profession, at the 39th All India Public Relations Conference at Visakhapatnam, Andhra Pradesh. He has also been honoured with the Visionary Leader in Media Education Award instituted by Business World Magazine & Exchange4media in November 2018; the first Khwaja Gareeb Nawaz Award for Unity, Brotherhood & Communal Harmony & Lifetime Achievement Award for contribution in the field of Media Education by NISCORT Media School & Eureka Publications

A TEDx Speaker, Suresh was a member of the prestigious feature film jury and non-fiction jury of Indian Panorama 2018 & 2017 respectively for the International Film Festival of India, headed by well-known filmmakers Rahul Rawail & Sudhir Mishra, Feature film section of National Film Awards Jury 2017 headed by noted filmmaker Priyadarshan and the chairman of its Northern Regional Jury. He was editor-in-chief and member of the international jury for the Media Colloquium at the prestigious Delhi Sustainable Development Summit -2015, and the only journalist to represent India at the World Media Conference in Seoul in March 2015, organized by leading US daily, The Washington Times. Suresh was on the international jury for the Plural+ International Youth Video Festival 2012, organised by the United Nations Alliance of Civilizations and the International Organisation for Migration. He was the first Indian to be nominated as a jury since the inception of the festival in 2009.

He has served as chairman, review committee for the 10th edition of National Science Film Festival of India (NSFFI) scheduled at Agartala, Tripura in February, 2020 & Chairman (Environment category), Prakriti film festival 2020 organized by Consortium for Educational Communication, UGC, Govt of India.

Suresh chaired the international jury of the 4th Woodpecker International Film Festival-2016, India's premier festival focusing on issue-based cinema and the jury of the 13th edition of the We Care International Film Festival on disability issues 2016. He was on the jury of the National Media Award 2016 instituted by Election Commission of India, CMS-UNICEF Media Fellowship-2016, the National Awards for Excellence in Journalism instituted by the Press Council of India, the UNICEF Radio4child awards 2016, Public Relations Society of India National Awards-2016 & the prestigious Laadli Media and Advertising Award for Gender Sensitivity 2014-15, organized by Population First and SCOPE Corporate Communication Excellence Awards 2017 & 2019.

Suresh has addressed national and international conferences, including the prestigious Jhabarmal Annual Lecture organized by Rajasthan Patrika and the Sat Paul Sahni Memorial Lecture organized by the Indian Institute of Public Administration in January 2017, the Anna Endowment Lecture at Anna University, Chennai, in January 2019; Indian Youth Parliament, Jaipur 2017 and Jaipur Youth Festival 2018, International Co-Production Conference at Seoul, South Korea, June 2018, organized by the Korea Communication Commission, the 3rd National Teachers' Congress at MIT World Peace University, Pune, in January 2019, keynote address on human rights at the LAWASIA International Conference in New Delhi, the Battle of Ideas panel discussion organized by the UK-based Institute of Ideas and the British Council, India, the India-Japan Global Partnership Summit in Tokyo, September 2011, the Fourth Forum of the UN Alliance of Civilizations (UNAOC) at Doha, Qatar in December 2011, the Fifth Forum of UNAOC at Vienna, Austria, Asian Youth Leaders' Summit, New Delhi, October 2013, 16th World Sanskrit Conference, Bangkok, June 2015 & World Hindi Conference, Mauritius 2018 besides chairing the session on 'Public Policy and Well Being' under the aegis of Indian Council of Social Science Research and University of Lausanne at Basel, Switzerland, September 2017.
