= Hemant Kanoria =

Indian businessman

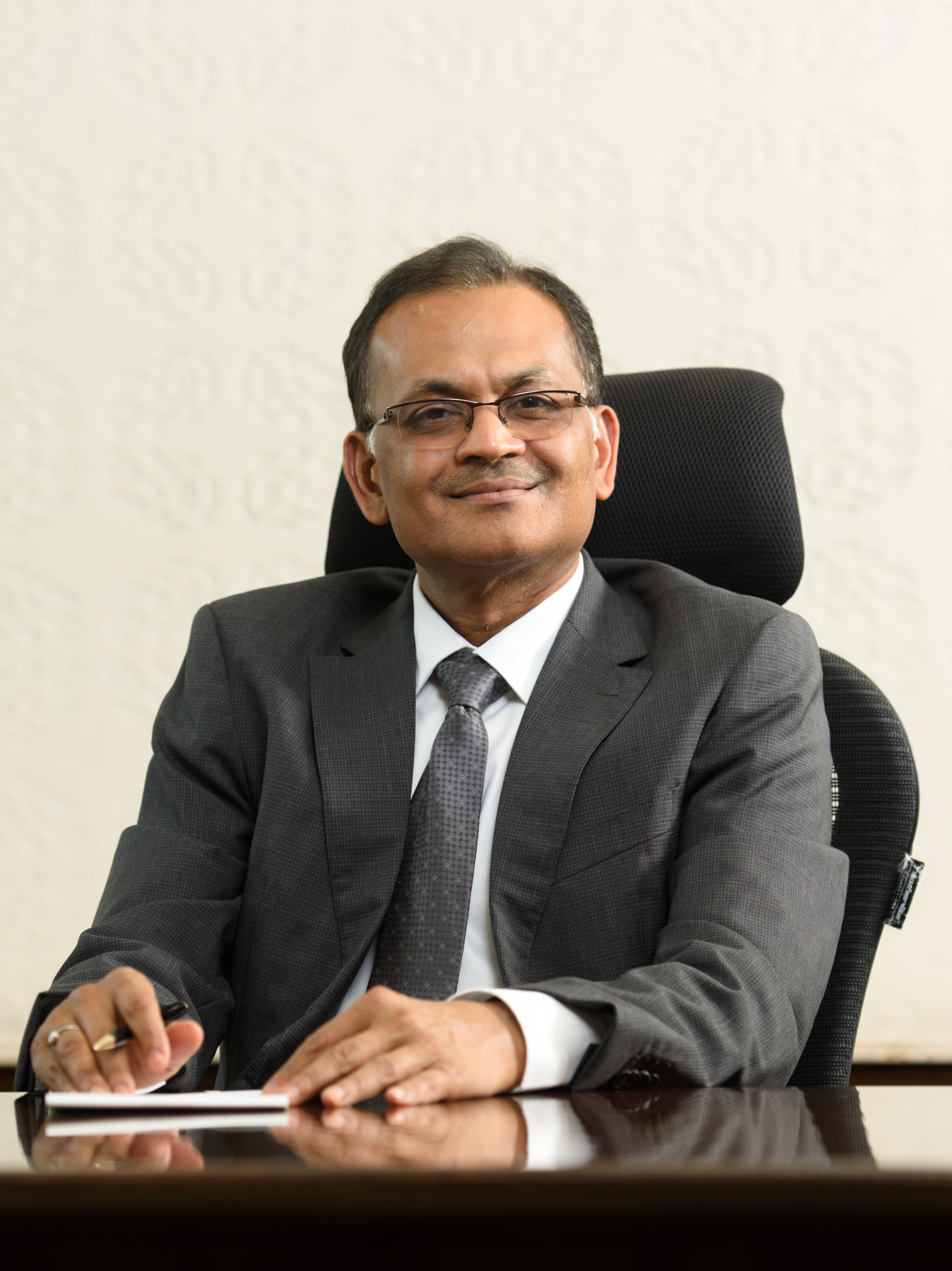
- Occupations: Entrepreneur & Philanthropist
- Spouse: Madhulika Kanoria

Hemant Kanoria is an Indian entrepreneur. He was the founder of Calcutta based finance company Srei Infrastructure Finance. He served as the Vice President of the Calcutta Chamber of Commerce. He also served as a Chairman of the FICCI National Committee on Infrastructure. He is a Vice President of All India Management Association. He has also served on the Board of Governors of Indian Institute of Management Calcutta and as a former Board Member in the Indian Institute of Information Technology, Guwahati, New Delhi Institute of Management and Neotia University.

== Early life and career ==
Kanoria operated two family-owned flour mills in West Bengal. After the family's exit from the business, he established a financing company for the construction sector, partnering with his brother, Sunil Kanoria.

He is a former member of the Advisory Council at the US-India Business Council and holds membership in the India-Russia CEOs Council and India-Singapore CEOs Forum. Additionally, he served as a G20 Advisory Council Member within the International Chamber of Commerce. He is currently council member of the Indo-German Chamber of Commerce. He has been a Member of Regional Direct Taxes Advisory Committee, Government of India.

== Social work ==
In 2014, Hemant Kanoria established the Kanoria foundation as a philanthropic trust to provide sustainable initiatives to the underprivileged. It aids underprivileged children through Suryodaya schools that offer holistic education and vocational training. The foundation also established the Acid Survivors and Women Welfare Foundation to provide treatment and rehabilitation for acid victims in India. Additionally, it organizes the largest World Confluence that focuses on humanity, power, and spirituality through the Universal Spirituality & Humanity Foundation. This event gathers global leaders to engage in discussions about the importance of humanity and spirituality.
