= Sunil Kanoria =

Indian businessman

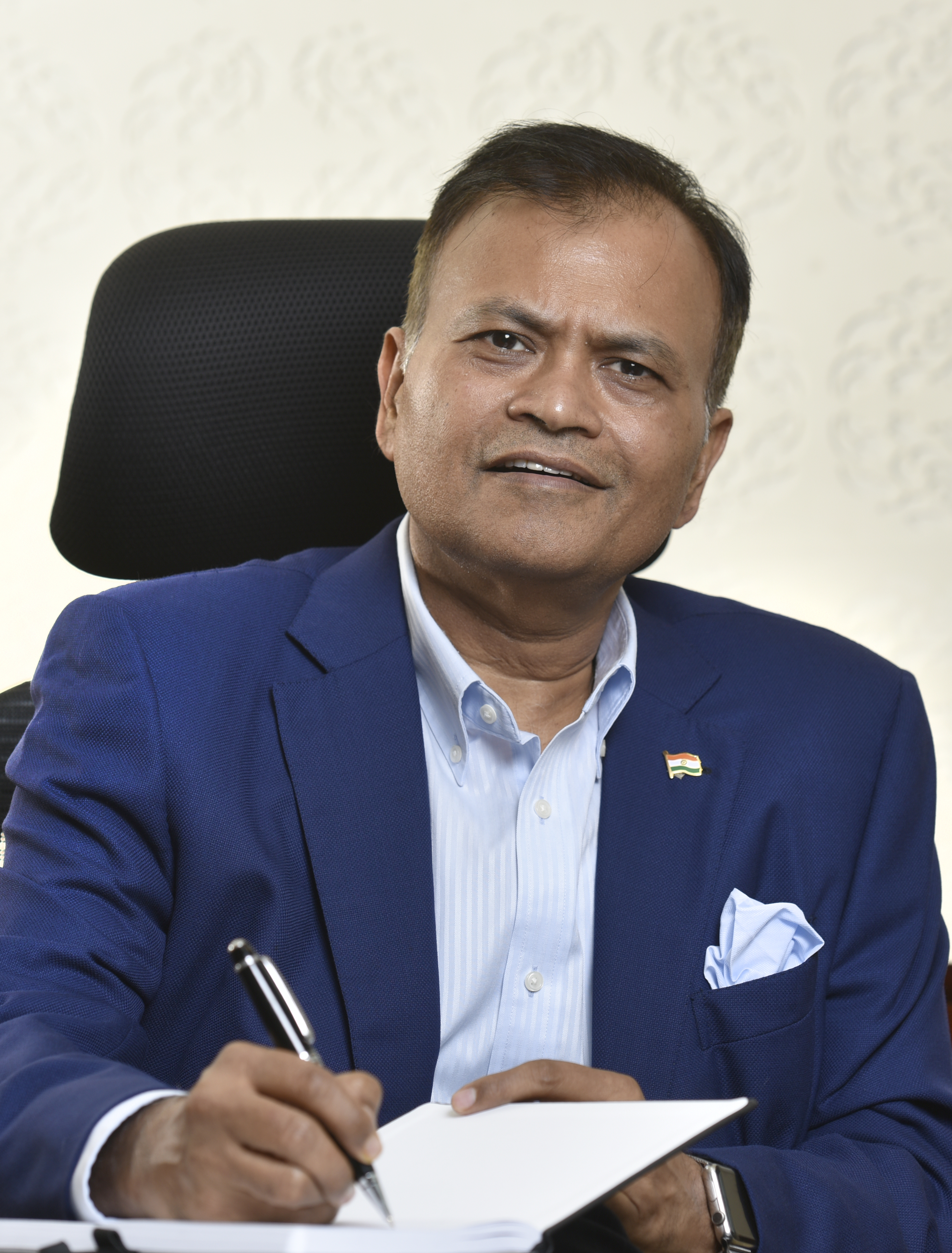
- Born: 4 May 1965 (age 60)
- Occupations: Entrepreneur & Philanthropist
- Spouse: Sunita Kanoria

Sunil Kanoria is a Kolkata-based Indian businessman. He was the co-founder of Srei Infrastructure Finance. He has served as the president of ASSOCHAM and as the Honorary Consul of Spain in Kolkata. He has held the position of a Member in the Construction Sector during the tenth Five-Year Plan as part of the Planning Commission within the Government of India. In a nomination by the Government of India, he served as a Council Member at the Institute of Chartered Accountants of India. He is the former President of the Agri Horticultural Society of India.

== Personal life ==
Sunil Kanoria was born on May 4, 1965, in Kolkata, India, into a Marwari Hindu family. He is the son of Hari Prasad Kanoria and Champa Devi Kanoria and is the third of five siblings.

== Career ==
Sunil co-founded Srei Infrastructure Finance Ltd. in 1989, in collaboration with his brother Hemant Kanoria. According to The Hindu report, Srei Infrastructure Finance Ltd. has established itself as an infrastructure equipment finance company in India, holding a market share of over 30% over the years. In 2007 had a key role in establishing a 50:50 joint venture with BNP Paribas, focusing on the leasing and financing of infrastructure equipment and projects. Additionally, in 2009, he formed a joint venture with Tata Teleservices, resulting in the formation of Viom Networks, a telecom tower company. Subsequently, in 2016, Srei's stake in Viom Networks was acquired by the American Tower Corporation.

== Philanthropic ==
Sunil has been instrumental in founding the Kanoria foundation, dedicated to child education, women's empowerment, and spirituality. The foundation supports education from nursery to higher levels, focusing on sustainable environments, moral values, violence prevention, and skill development. The Suryodaya Schools, a core initiative, provide underprivileged children with comprehensive education and vocational training. The foundation also aids acid attack survivors through collaboration with Acid Survivors and Women Welfare Foundation. The Kanoria Foundation organizes global events known as "Confluences" dedicated to addressing essential themes such as Humanity, Power, and Spirituality. Since its inception in 2009, the Foundation has hosted 13 of these gatherings.
