= War crimes of the Wehrmacht =

Violations by German forces in World War II

- Part of World War II
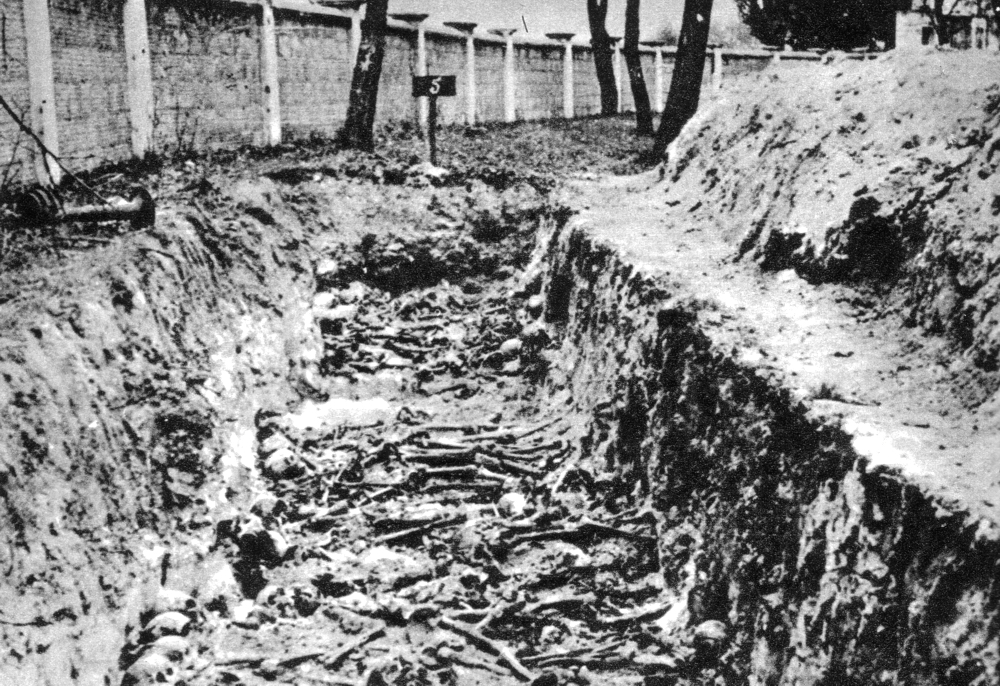
- Mass grave of Soviet prisoners of war. Soviet POWs were often subjected to forced marches without adequate food or water and commonly shot.
- Location: Europe and North Africa
- Date: 1939–1945
- Attack type: War crimes, mass murder, mass rape, genocide, ethnic cleansing, reprisals, mass shooting, starvation
- Perpetrator: Wehrmacht
- Motive: Nazi racism, Scientific racism, Germanisation, Lebensraum, Anti-Slavism, Ultranationalism
- Convictions: Nuremberg trials

During World War II, the German Wehrmacht (combined armed forces – Heer, Kriegsmarine, and Luftwaffe) committed systematic war crimes, including massacres, mass rape, looting, the exploitation of forced labour, the murder of three million Soviet prisoners of war, and participated in the extermination of Jews. While the Nazi Party's own SS forces (in particular the SS-Totenkopfverbände, Einsatzgruppen and Waffen-SS) was the organization most responsible for the Holocaust, the regular armed forces of the Wehrmacht committed many war crimes of their own (as well as assisting the SS in theirs), particularly on the Eastern Front.

Estimates of the percentage of Wehrmacht soldiers who committed war crimes vary greatly, from the single digits to the vast majority. Historians Alex J. Kay and David Stahel argue that, including crimes such as rape, forced labour, wanton destruction, and looting in addition to murder, "it would be reasonable to conclude that a substantial majority of the ten million Wehrmacht soldiers deployed at one time or another in the German-Soviet War were involved or complicit in criminal conduct". The German Wehrmacht is regarded as being a "crucial factor in the most horrendous crime perpetrated by any nation in modern history" in regard to genocides committed by the regime.

== Creation of the Wehrmacht ==
When the Nazi Party came to power, this was welcomed by almost the entire officer corps of the Reichswehr because of the Nazis' support for Wiederwehrhaftmachung (remilitarization) of Germany, the German rearmament and the total militarization of German society in order to ensure that Germany did not lose the next war. As such, what both the Nazi Regime and the German Army wanted to see was a totally militarized Volksgemeinschaft (people's community) that would be purged of perceived internal enemies like the Jews, who many believed had "stabbed Germany in the back" in 1918. The Wehrmacht was created by Adolf Hitler in 1935 with the passing of a law introducing conscription. It was composed of both volunteers and conscripts.

Many officers therefore willingly embraced Nazi ideology in the 1930s. Acting on his own initiative, the Defence Minister Werner von Blomberg had purged the Army of all its Jewish personnel in February 1934.

On December 8, 1938, the Army leadership instructed all officers to be thoroughly versed in National Socialism and to apply its values in all situations. Starting in February 1939, pamphlets were issued that were made required reading in the Army. The content can be gauged by the titles: "The Officer and Politics", "Hitler's World Historical Mission", "The Army in the Third Reich", "The Battle for German Living Space", "Hands off Danzig!", and "The Final Solution of the Jewish Question in the Third Reich". The latter essay proclaimed:

The defensive battle against Jewry will continue, even if the last Jew has left Germany. Two big and important tasks remain: 1) the eradication of all Jewish influence, above all in the economy and in culture; 2) the battle against World Jewry, which tries to incite all people in the world against Germany.

Attitudes like these colored all of the instructions that came to Wehrmacht troops in the summer of 1939 as a way of preparing for the attack on Poland.

== Criminal orders ==
During the planning for the invasion of the Soviet Union, a number of orders were devised by the Wehrmacht leadership. The orders contravened international law and established codes of conduct and became known collectively as "Criminal Orders". The orders were essentially a declaration of war against the civilian population.

In November 1935, the psychological war laboratory of the Reich Ministry of War submitted a study about how best to undermine Red Army morale should a German-Soviet war break out. Working closely with the émigré Russian Fascist Party based in Harbin, the German psychological warfare unit created a series of pamphlets written in Russian for distribution in the Soviet Union. Much of it was designed to play on Russian antisemitism, with one pamphlet calling the "Gentlemen commissars and party functionaries" a group of "mostly filthy Jews". The pamphlet ended with the call for "brother soldiers" of the Red Army to rise up and kill all of the "Jewish commissars".

Although this material was not used at the time, later in 1941 the material the psychological war laboratory had developed in 1935 was dusted off, and served as the basis not only for propaganda in the Soviet Union but also for propaganda within the Wehrmacht. Before Operation Barbarossa, German troops were exposed to violent antisemitic and anti-Slavic indoctrination via movies, radio, lectures, books and leaflets. The lectures were delivered by "National Socialist Leadership Officers", who were appointed for that purpose, and by their junior officers. German Army propaganda portrayed the Soviet enemy in the most dehumanized terms, depicting the Red Army as a force of Slavic Untermenschen (sub-humans) and "Asiatic" savages engaging in "barbaric Asiatic fighting methods" commanded by evil Jewish commissars to whom German troops were to grant no mercy.

British historian Richard J. Evans wrote that junior officers tended to be especially zealous National Socialists, with a third of them being Nazi Party members in 1941. The Wehrmacht did not just obey Hitler's criminal orders for Barbarossa because of obedience, but rather because they shared Hitler's belief that the Soviet Union was run by Jews, and that it was necessary for Germany to completely destroy "Judeo-Bolshevism".

=== Commissar Order ===
The Guidelines for the Treatment of Political Commissars cast the war against the Soviet Union as one of ideological and racial differences, and it provided for the immediate liquidation of political commissars in the Red Army. The order was formulated in 1941 with the participation of the Army High Command (the OKH) and issued by the Wehrmacht High Command (the OKW). General Franz Halder welcomed it, writing that "Troops must participate in the ideological battle in the Eastern campaign to the end".

On 17 July 1941, the OKW declared that the Wehrmacht was to:

[F]ree itself from all elements among the prisoners of war considered Bolshevik driving forces. The special situation of the Eastern Campaign therefore demands special measures [a euphemism for killing] which are to be carried out free from bureaucratic and administrative influence and with a willingness to accept responsibility. While so far the regulations and orders concerning prisoners of war were based solely on military considerations, now the political objective must be attained, which is to protect the German nation from Bolshevik inciters and forthwith take the occupied territory strictly in hand.

As such, all Soviet POWs considered to be commissars together with all Jewish POWs were to be handed over to the Einsatzgruppen to be shot. The OKW attached great importance to the killings of POWs believed to be commissars as it was believed that if the captured commissars reached POW camps in Germany that they would stage another German Stab-in-the-back like that believed to have caused Germany's defeat in World War I. Between July–October 1941, between 580,000 and 600,000 POWs in Wehrmacht custody were turned over to the SS to be killed. In September 1941, both Helmuth James von Moltke and Admiral Wilhelm Canaris wrote memos pointing out to the OKW that the order of July 17, 1941 was illegal under international law.

In particular, both Moltke and Admiral Canaris noted that the German claim that Soviet POWs had no rights because the Soviet Union had not ratified the Geneva Convention was invalid, as Germany had ratified the Geneva Convention and thus under international law was obliged to provide humane treatment for the POWs in its care. In response, Field-Marshal Wilhelm Keitel wrote: "These scruples accord with the soldierly concepts of a chivalrous war! Here we are concerned with the extermination of an ideology. That is why I approve and defend this measure".

In the summer of 1942, there was an illusory liberalization of the treatment of captured political officers. On 10 June, the Gestapo chief Heinrich Müller issued an order on the segregation of prisoners and ordered that commissars be isolated from the rest of the prisoners and sent to Mauthausen-Gusen concentration camp. However, this did not change the plight of commissars much, as Mauthausen was one of the worst Nazi concentration camps where they usually waited for a slow death. On 20 October 1942, Müller again ordered commissars captured in battle to be shot on the spot. Only those commissars who were identified as deserters were sent to Mauthausen. In the following months, reports continued to be filed regarding the executions of Soviet commissars. The last known account of the liquidation of a political officer came from units of Army Group South in July 1943.

The historian Jürgen Förster wrote that the majority of Wehrmacht officers sincerely believed that most Red Army commissars were Jews and that the best way to defeat the Soviet Union was to kill all of the commissars so as to deprive the Soviet soldiers of their Jewish leaders.

=== Barbarossa Decree ===
The background behind the Barbarossa Decree was laid out by Hitler during a high-level meeting with military officials on 30 March 1941, where he declared that war against Soviet Russia would be a war of extermination, in which both the political and intellectual elites of Russia would be eradicated by German forces, in order to ensure a long-lasting German victory. Hitler underlined that executions would not be a matter for military courts, but for the organised action of the military.

The decree, issued by Field Marshal Keitel a few weeks before Operation Barbarossa, exempted punishable offenses committed by enemy civilians (in Russia) from the jurisdiction of military justice. Suspects were to be brought before an officer who would decide if they were to be shot.

The order specified:

- "The partisans are to be ruthlessly eliminated in battle or during attempts to escape", and all attacks by the civilian population against Wehrmacht soldiers are to be "suppressed by the army on the spot by using extreme measures, till [the] annihilation of the attackers;
- "Every officer in the German occupation in the East of the future will be entitled to perform execution(s) without trial, without any formalities, on any person suspected of having a hostile attitude towards the Germans", (the same applied to prisoners of war);
- "If you have not managed to identify and punish the perpetrators of anti-German acts, you are allowed to apply the principle of collective responsibility. 'Collective measures' against residents of the area where the attack occurred can then be applied after approval by the battalion commander or higher level of command";
- German soldiers who commit crimes against humanity, the USSR and prisoners of war are to be exempted from criminal responsibility, even if they commit acts punishable according to German law.

Contrary to what was claimed after the war, the Wehrmacht generals such as Heinz Guderian, did not intend to mitigate the records of the jurisdiction of an order, or in any way violate Hitler's intentions. His command was intended solely to prevent individual excesses which could damage discipline within army ranks, without changing the extermination intentions of the order. As part of the policy of harshness towards Slavic "sub-humans" and to prevent any tendency towards seeing the enemy as human, German troops were ordered to go out of their way to mistreat women and children in Russia.

=== Guidelines for the Conduct of the Troops in Russia ===
The "Guidelines for the Conduct of the Troops in Russia" issued by the OKW on 19 May 1941 declared "Judeo-Bolshevism" to be the most deadly enemy of the German nation, and that "It is against this destructive ideology and its adherents that Germany is waging war". The guidelines went on to demand "ruthless and vigorous measures against Bolshevik inciters, guerrillas, saboteurs, Jews, and the complete elimination of all active and passive resistance." Influenced by the guidelines, in a directive sent out to the troops under his command, General Erich Hoepner of the Panzer Group 4 stated:

The war against Russia is an important chapter in the German nation's struggle for existence. It is the old battle of the Germanic against the Slavic people, of the defence of European culture against Muscovite-Asiatic inundation and of the repulse of Jewish Bolshevism. The objective of this battle must be the demolition of present-day Russia and must therefore be conducted with unprecedented severity. Every military action must be guided in planning and execution by an iron resolution to exterminate the enemy remorselessly and totally. In particular, no adherents of the contemporary Russian Bolshevik system are to be spared.

=== Other orders ===
In the same spirit, General Müller, who was the Wehrmacht's senior liaison officer for legal matters, in a lecture to military judges on June 11, 1941, advised the judges present that "...in the operation to come, feelings of justice must in certain situations give way to military exigencies and then revert to old habits of warfare ... One of the two adversaries must be finished off. Adherents of the hostile attitude are not to be conserved, but liquidated". General Müller declared that, in the war against the Soviet Union, any Soviet civilian who was felt to be hindering the German war effort was to be regarded as a "guerrilla" and shot on the spot. The Army's Chief of Staff, General Franz Halder, declared in a directive that in the event of guerrilla attacks, German troops were to impose "collective measures of force" by massacring villages.

Typical of the German Army propaganda was the following passage from a pamphlet issued in June 1941:

Anyone who has ever looked into the face of a Red commissar knows what the Bolsheviks are. There is no need here for theoretical reflections. It would be an insult to animals if one were to call the features of these, largely Jewish, tormentors of people beasts. They are the embodiment of the infernal, of the personified insane hatred of everything that is noble in humanity. In the shape of these commissars we witness the revolt of the subhuman against noble blood. The masses whom they are driving to their deaths with every means of icy terror and lunatic incitement would have brought about an end of all meaningful life, had the incursion not been prevented at the last moment;" [the last statement is a reference to the "preventive war" that Barbarossa was alleged to be].

German Army propaganda often gave extracts in newsletters concerning the missions for German troops in the East: "It is necessary to eliminate the red subhumans, along with their Kremlin dictators. German people will have a great task to perform, the biggest in its history, and the world will hear more about that this task will be completed till the end.

As a result of this propaganda, the majority of the Wehrmacht Heer officers and soldiers tended to regard the war in Nazi terms, seeing their Soviet opponents as “subhuman”. One German soldier wrote home to his father on 4 August 1941 that:

The pitiful hordes on the other side are nothing but felons who are driven by alcohol and the [commissars'] threat of pistols at their heads ... They are nothing but a bunch of assholes! ... Having encountered these Bolshevik hordes and having seen how they live has made a lasting impression on me. Everyone, even the last doubter, knows today that the battle against these sub-humans, who've been whipped into a frenzy by the Jews, was not only necessary but came in the nick of time. Our Führer has saved Europe from certain chaos.

The order was in line with the interests of the German High Command, which was eager to secure logistical facilities and routes behind the front line for the divisions on the Eastern Front.

In October 1941, the commander of the 12th Infantry Division sent out a directive saying "the carrying of information is mostly done by youngsters in the ages of 11–14" and that "as the Russian is more afraid of the truncheon than of weapons, flogging is the most advisable measure for interrogation". The Nazis at the beginning of the war banned sexual relations between Germans and foreign slave workers. In accordance to these new racial laws issued by the Nazis; in November 1941, the commander of the 18th Panzer Division warned his soldiers not to have sex with "sub-human" Russian women, and ordered that any Russian women found having sex with a German soldier was to be handed over to the SS to be executed at once.

A decree ordered on 20 February 1942 declared that sexual intercourse between a German woman and a Russian worker or prisoner of war would result in the latter being punished by the death penalty. During the war, hundreds of Polish and Russian men were found guilty of "race defilement" for their relations with German women and were executed.

The Night and Fog Decree, issued by Hitler in 1941 and disseminated along with a directive from Keitel, was operated within the conquered territories in the West (Belgium, France, Luxembourg, Norway, Denmark and the Netherlands). The decree allowed those "endangering German security" to be seized and made to disappear without trace. Keitel's directive stated that "efficient intimidation can only be achieved either by capital punishment or by measures by which the relatives of the criminal and the population do not know his fate."

== Poland ==
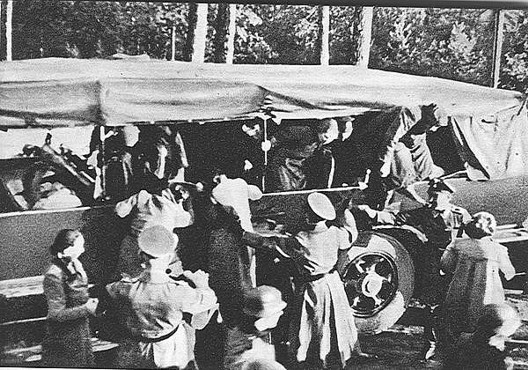
The Nazi Security Police rounding up Polish intelligentsia at Palmiry near Warsaw in 1940

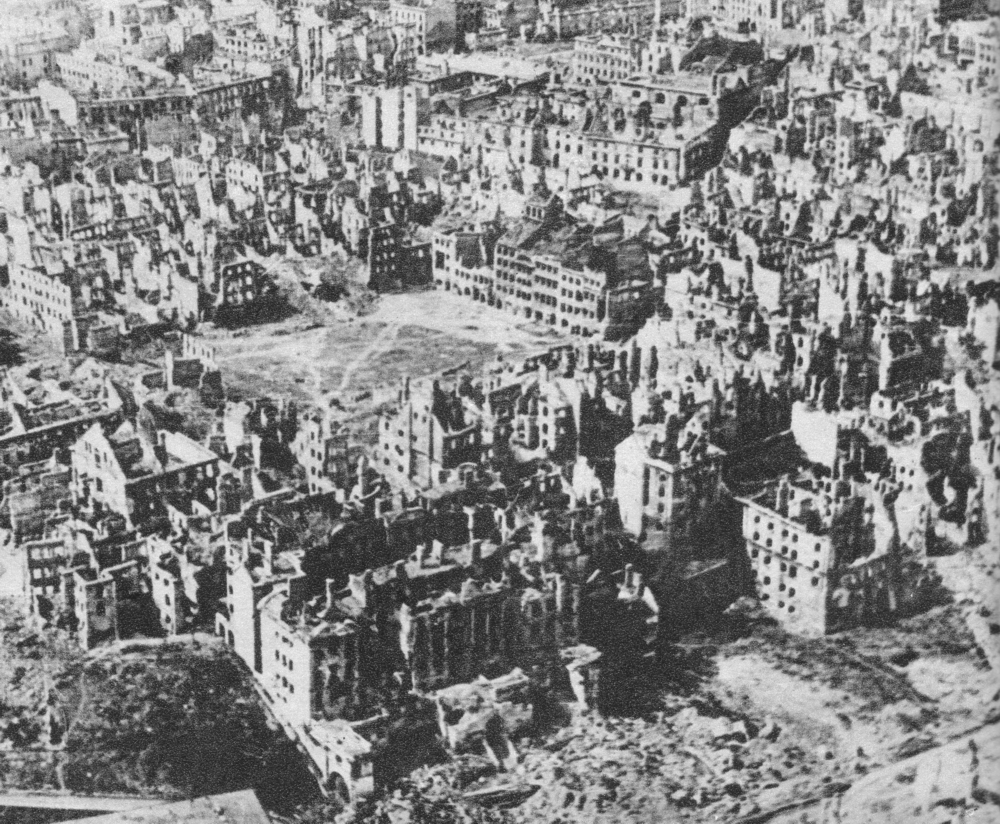
During World War II 85% of buildings in Warsaw were destroyed by German troops.

Wehrmacht attitudes towards Poles were a combination of contempt, fear, and a belief that violence was the best way to deal with them.

=== Mass murder of Polish civilians ===
The Wehrmacht responded brutally to acts by alleged insurgents during the invasion of Poland in 1939 and was responsible for indiscriminate shootings of prisoners of war and civilians. Any act of defiance was met with the most ruthless violence, although the Army leadership did seek to discourage so-called "wild" shootings where Wehrmacht troops would shoot civilians on their own initiative or participate in murders conducted by the SS. Court-martial proceedings were begun against some of the junior officers who had led these shootings, but this was nullified on 4 October 1939, when Hitler pardoned all military personnel who had been involved in war crimes in Poland. After the end of hostilities, during the Wehrmacht's administration of Poland, which went on until 25 October 1939, 531 towns and villages were burned; the Wehrmacht carried out 714 mass executions, alongside many incidents of plunder, banditry and murder. Altogether, it is estimated that 16,376 Poles fell victim to these atrocities. Approximately 60% of these crimes were committed by the Wehrmacht. Wehrmacht soldiers frequently engaged in the massacre of Jews on their own, rather than just assisting in rounding them up for the SS.

In the summer of 1940, Reinhard Heydrich, the chief of the Reich Security Main Office (including the Gestapo), noted that: "...compared to the crimes, robberies and excesses committed by the army [part of the Wehrmacht], the SS and the police don't look all that bad". Even when the German Army was not involved in war crimes, all of the top military leaders were aware of what was happening in Poland. None objected on moral principles; the few who did object did so due to concerns about discipline. Moreover, the general who objected the loudest to war crimes in Poland, General Johannes Blaskowitz, was opposed to the Army committing war crimes with the SS, not the idea of atrocities against Poland. The Israeli historian Omer Bartov wrote that Blaskowitz was actually "legitimizing murder" by expressing approval of SS massacres while demanding that the Army be kept out of discipline damaging decimation; Bartov reported that once officers and troops saw that murder was "legitimate" in Poland, the effect was that the Army tended to copy the SS.

Up to 13,000 soldiers and between 120,000 and 200,000 civilians were killed by German-led forces during the Warsaw Uprising. At least 5,000 German regular soldiers assisted the SS in crushing Polish resistance, most of them reserve units. Human shields were used by German forces during the fighting.

Throughout the campaign the Wehrmacht engaged in widespread theft and plunder of Polish citizens' property. Until 3 November 1939 the Wehrmacht sent to Nazi Germany 10,000 train wagons with stolen property including agricultural machinery, furniture and food.

In one of the Germany military's first acts of World War II, the German air force, the Luftwaffe, bombed the Polish town of Wieluń and later went on to bomb cities across the country, including Warsaw, Frampol and various other cities. Collectively the bombings killed tens of thousands of Polish civilians. However, no positive or specific customary international humanitarian law with respect to aerial warfare existed prior to and during World War II which means that at the time, strategic bombings were not officially war crimes. For this reason, no German officers were prosecuted at the post-World War II Allied war crime trials for aerial raids.

=== Massacres of Polish POWs ===
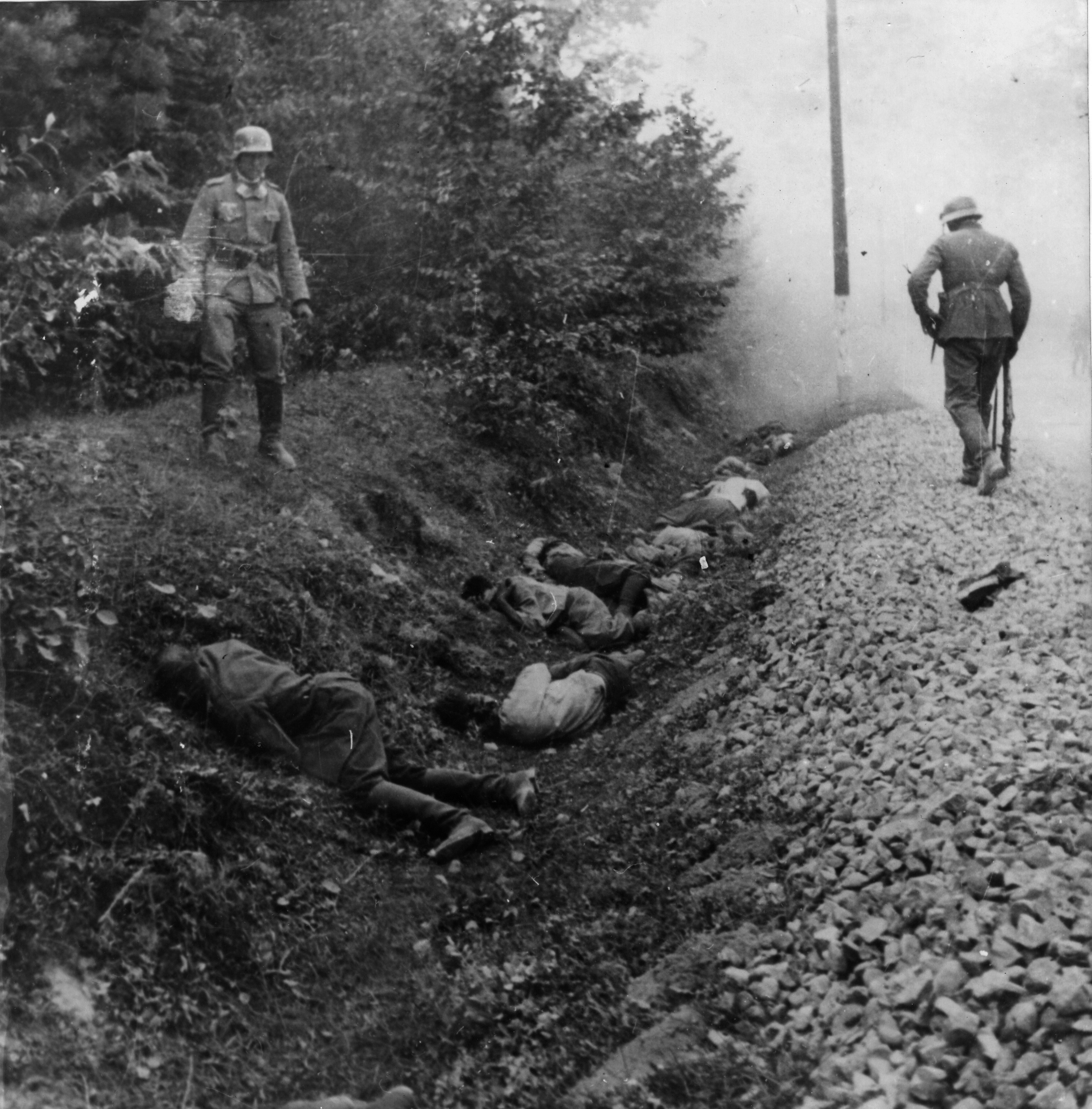
About 300 Polish POWs executed by the soldiers of the German 15th motorized infantry regiment in Ciepielów on September 9, 1939

Numerous examples exist in which Polish soldiers were killed after capture; for instance, at Śladów (the Śladów massacre), where 252 prisoners of war (POW)s were shot or drowned, at Ciepielów, where some 300 POWs were killed (the Ciepielów massacre), and at Zambrów, where a further 200 were killed (the Zambrów massacre). Polish POWs of Jewish origin were routinely selected and shot on the spot.

The prisoners in the temporary POW camp in Żyrardów, captured after the Battle of the Bzura, were denied any food and starved for ten days. In some cases Polish POWs were burned alive. Units of the Polish 7th Infantry Division were massacred after being captured in several individual acts of revenge for their resistance in combat. On September 11, Wehrmacht soldiers threw hand grenades into a school building where they kept Polish POWs. According to German historian Jochen Böhler, the Wehrmacht mass murdered at least 3,000 Polish POWs during the campaign.

The killing of POWs by Wehrmacht soldiers started during the September 1939 Poland campaign. In many cases large groups of Polish soldiers were murdered after capture. Hitler's Commando Order, issued in 1942, provided "justification" for the shooting of enemy commandos, whether uniformed or not.

== Belgium ==
Between 25 and 28 May 1940, the Wehrmacht committed several war crimes in and near the small Belgian village of Vinkt. Hostages were taken and used as human shields. As the Belgian Army continued to resist, farms were searched and looted, and more hostages were taken. In all, eighty-six civilians were executed. Besides Vinkt, other massacres and shootings happened with estimates of 600 victims.

== France ==
In the course of fighting in the north of France in May 1940, Wehrmacht troops of the 267th Infantry Division killed 124 civilians in the Oignies and Courrières massacre. An estimated 500 civilians are believed to have been murdered by German forces in the Nord-Pas de Calais region.

During the rout of the French Army, in June 1940, the Großdeutschland Regiment massacred African soldiers and their European officers it had taken prisoner near the Bois d'Eraine. Ten more African Frenchmen were murdered near Lyon.

The same month, 9th Infantry Division combatants massacred African soldiers of the 4th North African Infantry Division they had captured near Erquivillers. A German officer is cited in French reports as explaining "an inferior race does not deserve to do battle with a civilized race such as the Germans."

On 20 June 1940, 50 African soldiers were executed outside of Lyon in the Chasselay massacre.

In September 1944, during the retreat from France, the garrison of Brest executed civilians and looted and destroyed civilian property during the Battle for Brest. The commander of the garrison, Generalleutnant Hermann-Bernhard Ramcke, was convicted of war crimes relating to these actions in 1951.

The massacres include that of at least 1500 African French POWs of West African origin and was preceded by propaganda depicting the Africans as savages. From October 1942 onwards, the Wehrmacht carried out the 'Commando Order' calling for the summary execution of all captured commandos, even if in uniform. After the Italian armistice in 1943, many POWs were executed on several occasions when Italian troops resisted their forcible disarmament by the Germans. The massacre of the Acqui Division at Kefalonia is the most infamous.

== The Balkans ==
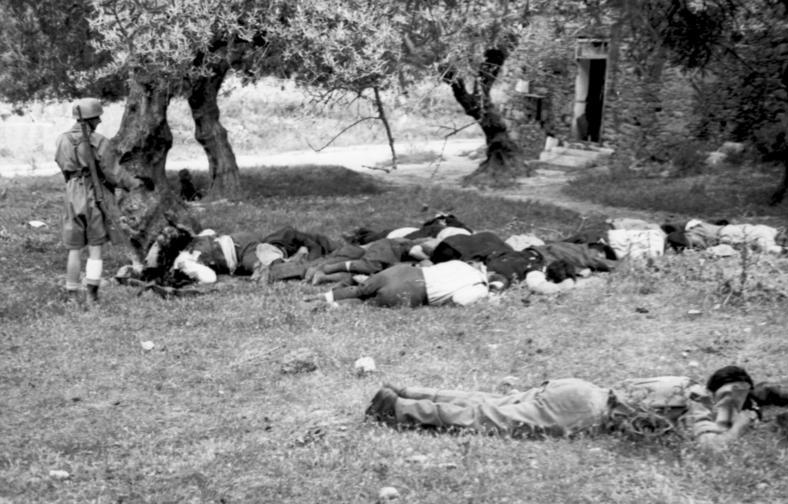
The murder of Greek civilians in Kondomari, Crete by German paratroopers 1941

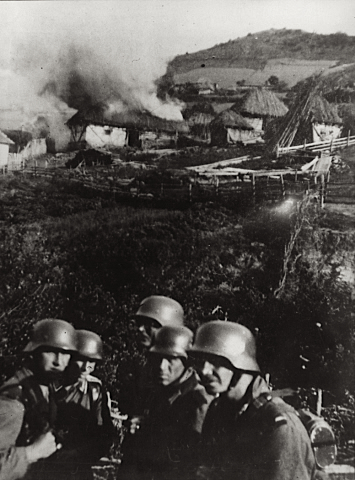
Germans set fire to a Serbian village near Kosovska Mitrovica.

Following the Yugoslav coup d'état on 27 March 1941, Hitler considered this act to be a personal insult and called for the immediate destruction of Yugoslavia via Führer Directive No. 25. Commencing on 6 April 1941, the directive was enacted with a large scale German bombing of Belgrade occurring in the early hours of the invasion. Indiscriminate bombing of civilian targets lead to the deaths of between 1,500 and 17,000 civilians. Following the end of the war, Generaloberst Alexander Löhr was found guilty of war crimes including his part in the bombing of Belgrade. He was executed in 1948.

In Serbia and Greece, many villages were razed and their inhabitants murdered during anti-partisan operations. Examples in Greece include Alikianos, Chortiatis, Kaisariani, Kalavryta, Kali Sykia, Kallikratis, Kleisoura, Kondomari, Kommeno, Lyngiades, Malathyros, Mesovouno, Missiria, Mousiotitsa, Paramythia and Skourvoula; the razings of Kandanos, Anogeia and Vorizia; the Viannos massacres; and numerous incidents of smaller scale.

More than 2,700 Serbian civilians were killed by the Wehrmacht in the Kragujevac massacre of October 1941. An additional 2,000 were killed in the Kraljevo massacre around the same time. By December 1941, between 20,000 and 30,000 civilians had been shot in German reprisal shootings in Serbia.

== Italy ==
On 26 March 1944, 15 uniformed US Army officers and men were shot without trial at La Spezia, in Italy, after orders of the commander of the German 75th Army Corps, General Anton Dostler, despite the opposition of his subordinates of the 135th Fortress Brigade. Dostler was sentenced to death by an American military tribunal and executed by firing squad in December 1945.

Whilst commanding the 65th Infantry Division, Lieutenant General Gustav Heistermann von Ziehlberg ordered the illegal executions of four SAS men between September and October 1943. On one occasion, he also took 34 Italian civilians hostage and requested permission to execute them in reprisal for suspected partisan attacks, which was denied. Von Ziehlberg was executed in February 1945, for allowing a conspirator in the 20 July plot to escape.

== Soviet Union ==
Some German officers had considered Communism in the Soviet Union to be a Jewish plot even before the Third Reich. In 1918, Karl von Bothmer, the German Army's plenipotentiary in Moscow, called the Bolsheviks "a gang of Jews" and expressed the desire "to see a few hundred of these louts hanging on the Kremlin wall". Evaluations of the Red Army by the visiting Reichswehr officers during the period of German-Soviet co-operation in the 1920s often show antisemitism with comments about the "Jewish slyness" of General Lev Snitman or the "Jewish blood" of General Leonid Vajner being very typical.

In 1932, Ewald Banse, a leading German professor and a member of the National Association for the Military Sciences (a group secretly financed by the Reichswehr) wrote in a pamphlet calling for "intellectual world domination" by Germany wrote that the Soviet leadership was mostly Jewish who dominated the apathetic and mindless Russian masses. In 1935, Colonel Carl-Heinrich von Stülpnagel in a report about the military capacity of the Red Army wrote that the commissars were "mostly of the Jewish race".

=== Reprisals and the Holocaust ===
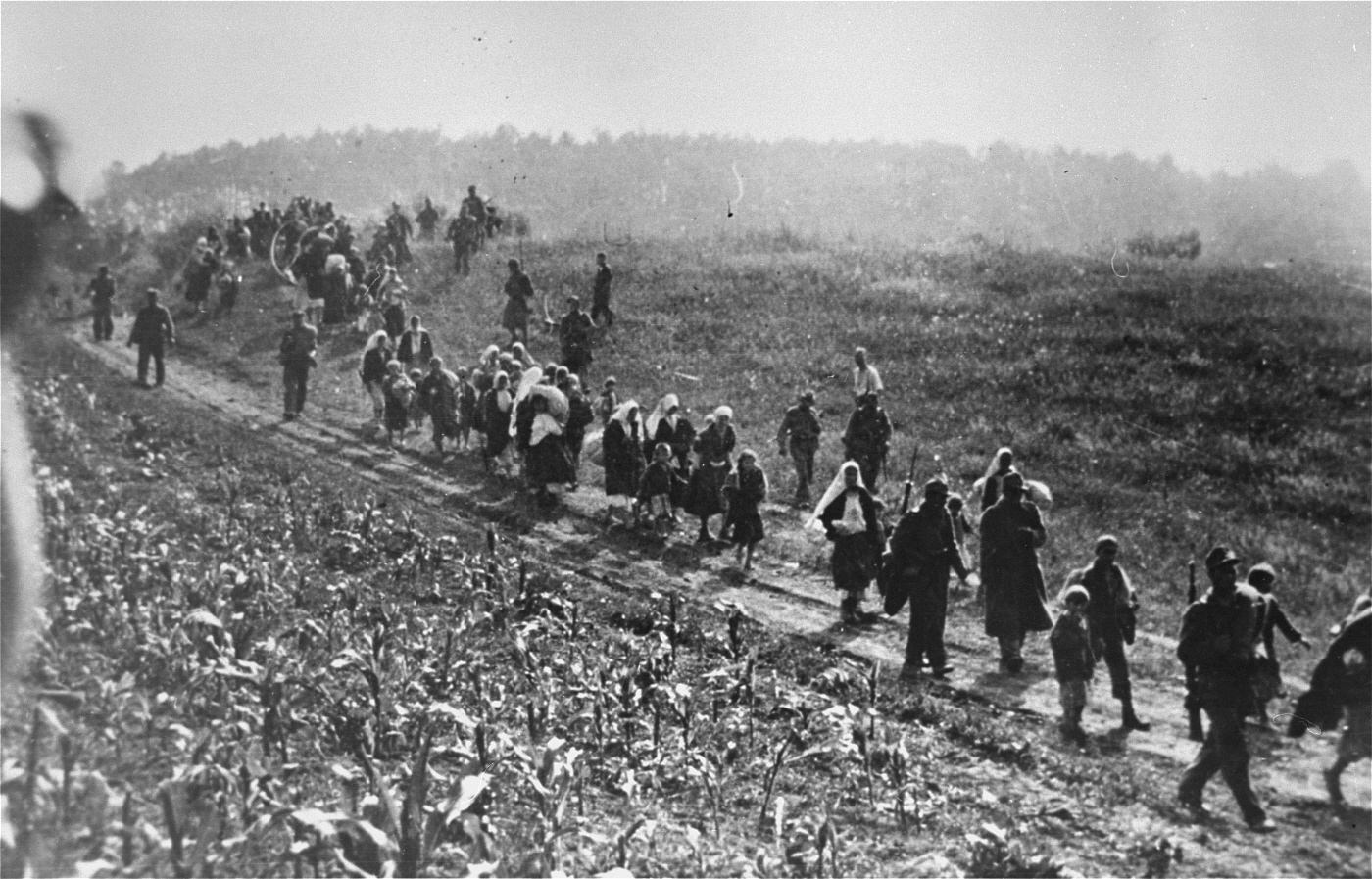
German forces and Ustaše collaborators lead a column of Serbs to the Šabac internment camp during anti-partisan "cleansing" operations.

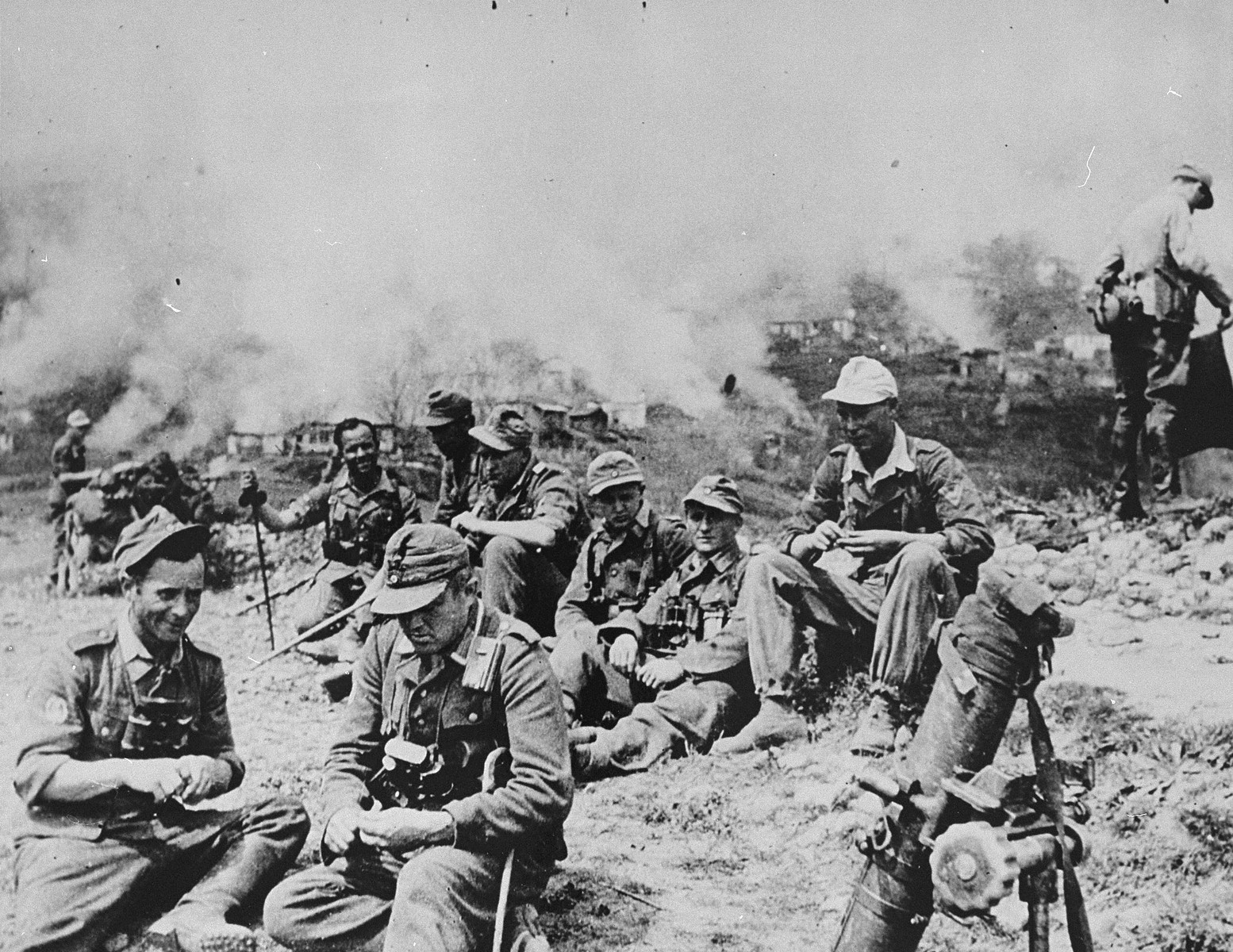
German soldiers relax after destroying a village in Epirus, Greece.

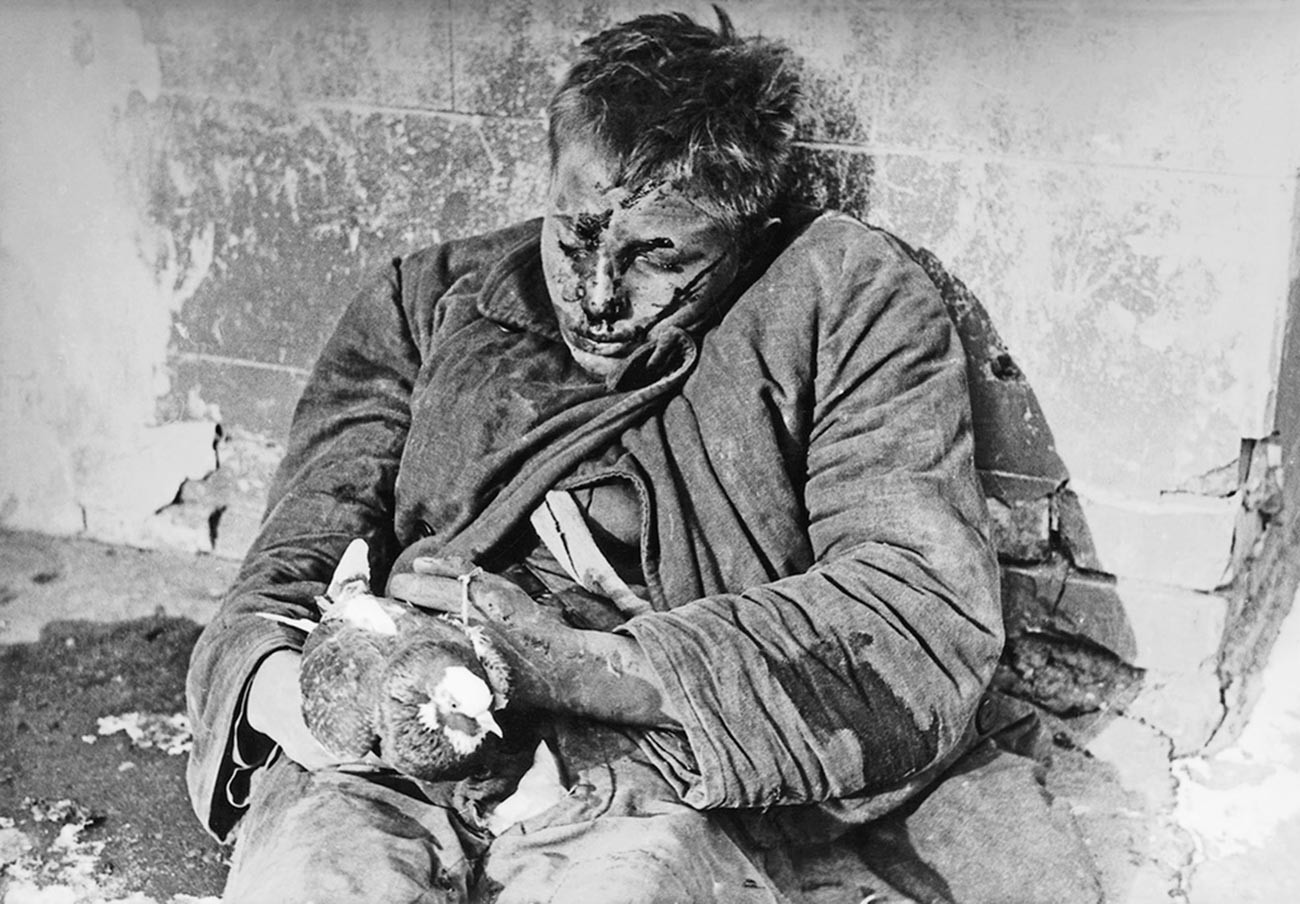
Viktor Cherevichkin, a Soviet teenager killed by German troops occupying Rostov for keeping pigeons

In the spring of 1941, Heydrich and General Eduard Wagner successfully completed negotiations for co-operation between the Einsatzgruppen and the German Army to allow the implementation of "special tasks". Following the Heydrich-Wagner agreement on 28 April 1941, Field Marshal Walther von Brauchitsch ordered when Operation Barbarossa began that all German Army commanders were to identify and register all Jews in the occupied areas in the Soviet Union at once and to co-operate fully with the Einsatzgruppen. Each Einsatzgruppe, in its area of operations, was under the control of the Higher SS and Police Leaders. In a further agreement between the Army and the SS concluded in May 1941 by General Wagner and Walter Schellenberg, it was agreed that the Einsatzgruppen in front-line areas were to operate under Army command while the Army would provide the Einsatzgruppen with all necessary logistical support. Under the guise of "anti-bandit" (Bandenbekämpfung) operations, the Wehrmacht in the Soviet Union massacred Jews and other civilians. Co-operation with the SS in reprisals and anti-Jewish operations was close and intensive.

In August 1941, following the protests by two Lutheran chaplains about the massacre of a group of Jewish women and children at Byelaya Tserkov, General von Reichenau wrote:

The conclusion of the report in question contains the following sentence, "In the case in question, measures against women and children were undertaken which in no way differ from atrocities carried out by the enemy about which the troops are continually being informed".
I have to describe this assessment as incorrect, inappropriate and impertinent in the extreme. Moreover, this comment was written in an open communication which passes through many hands. It would have been far better if the report had not been written at all.

One SS man who saw the killings at Byelaya Tserkov described them as follows:

I went to the woods alone. The Wehrmacht had already dug a grave. The children were brought along in a tractor. I had nothing to do with this technical procedure. The Ukrainians were standing around trembling. The children were taken down from the tractor. They were lined up along the top of the grave and shot so that they fell into it. The Ukrainians did not aim at any particular part of the body. They fell into the grave. The wailing was indescribable. I shall never forget the scene throughout my life. I find it very hard to bear. I particularly remember a small fair-haired girl who took me by the hand. She too was shot later ... The grave was near some woods. It was not near the rifle-range. The execution must had taken place in the afternoon at about 3.30 or 4.00. It took place the day after the discussions at the Feldkommandanten...Many children were hit four or five times before they died.

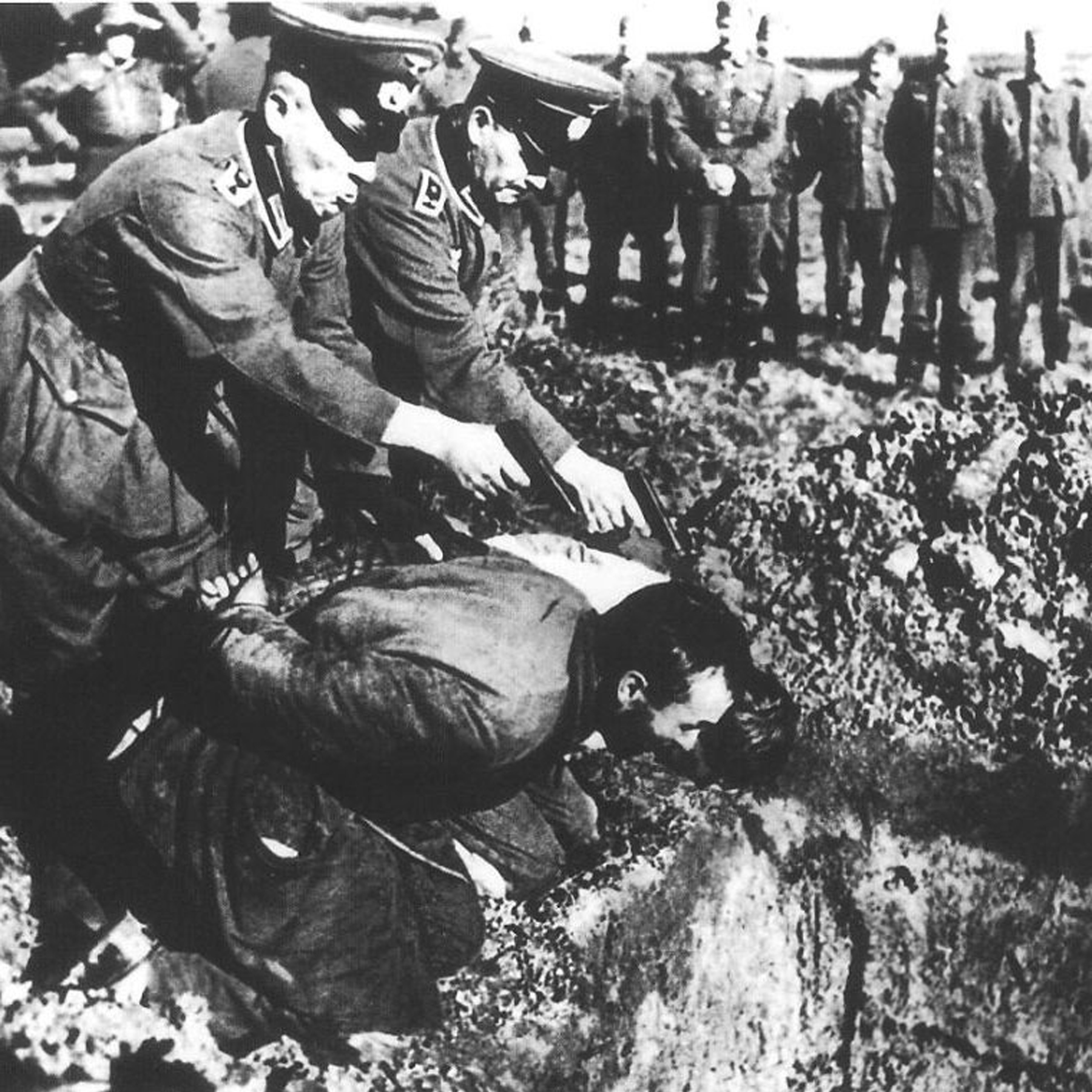
German officers of the 16th Army executing Soviet civilians, 1943

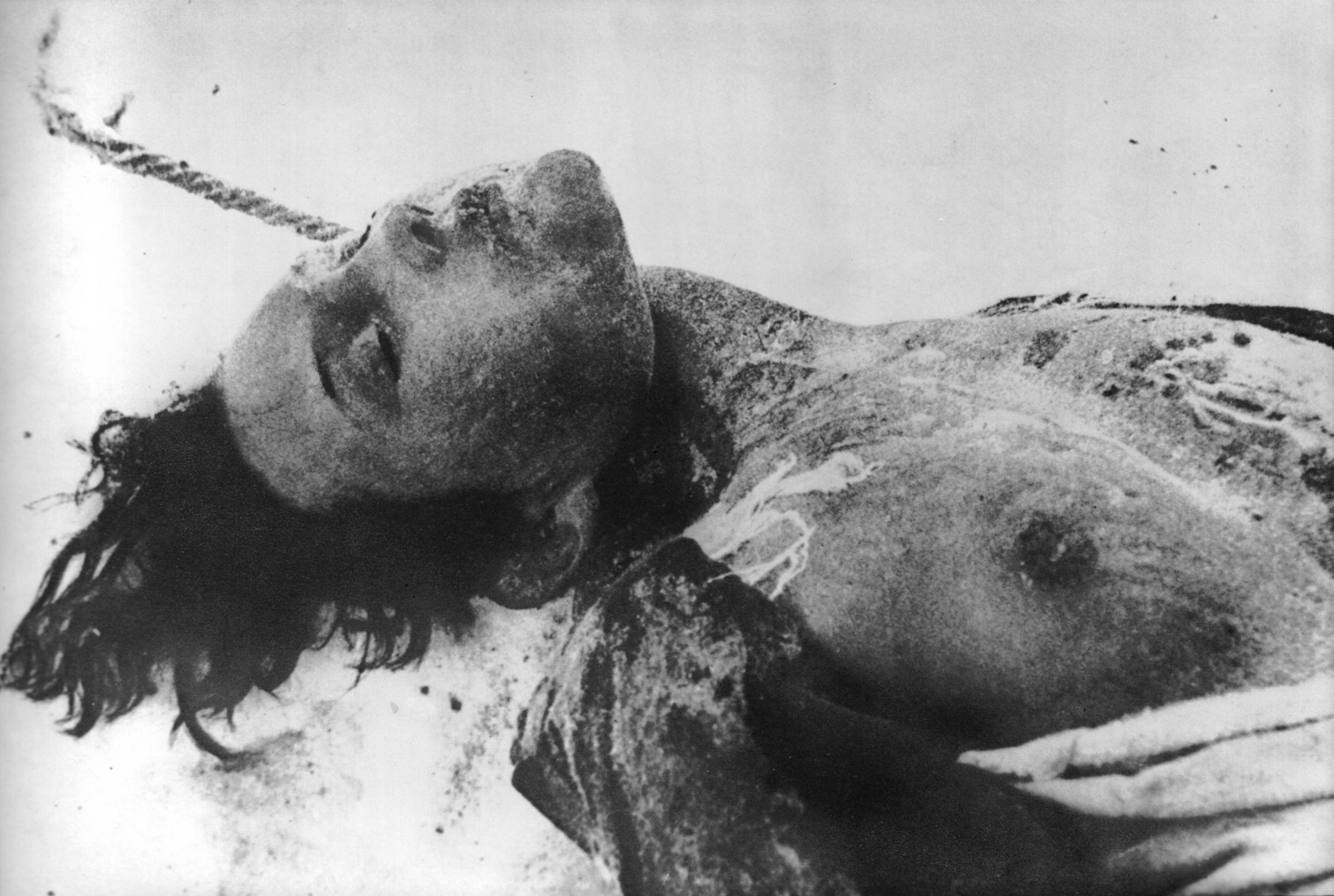
Zoya Kosmodemyanskaya, hanged as a partisan by German troops

In the summer of 1941, the SS Cavalry Brigade commanded by Hermann Fegelein during the course of "anti-partisan" operations in the Pripyat Marshes killed 699 Red Army soldiers, 1,100 partisans and 14,178 Jews. Before the operation, Fegelein had been ordered to shoot all adult Jews while driving the women and children into the marshes. After the operation, General Max von Schenckendorff, who commanded the Army Group Centre Rear Area ordered on 10 August 1941 that all Wehrmacht security divisions when on anti-partisan duty were to emulate Fegelein's example and organized between 24 and 26 September 1941 in Mogilev, a joint SS-Police-Wehrmacht training event on how best to murder "partisans", and by extension, Jews. The seminar, which became known as the Mogilev Conference, ended with the 7th Company of Police Battalion 322 of the Order Police shooting 32 Jews at a village called Knjashizy before the assembled officers as an example of how to "screen" the population for partisans. As the war diary of the Battalion 322 read:

The action, first scheduled as a training exercise was carried out under real-life conditions (ernstfallmässig) in the village itself. Suspicious strangers, especially partisans, could not be found. The screening of the population, however, resulted in 13 Jews, 27 Jewish women and 11 Jewish children, of which 13 Jews and 19 Jewish women were shot in co-operation with the Security Service.

Based on what they had learned during the Mogilev Conference, one Wehrmacht officer told his men "Where the partisan is, there is the Jew and where the Jew is, there is the partisan". The 707th Infantry Division of the Wehrmacht put this principle into practice during an "anti-partisan" sweep that saw the division shoot 10,431 people out of the 19,940 it had detained during the sweep while suffering only two dead and five wounded in the process.

In Order No. 24 dated 24 November 1941, the commander of the 707th Division declared:

5. Jews and Gypsies: ... As already has been ordered, the Jews have to vanish from the flat country and the Gypsies have to be annihilated too. The carrying out of larger Jewish actions is not the task of the divisional units. They are carried out by civilian or police authorities, if necessary ordered by the commandant of White Ruthenia, if he has special units at his disposal, or for security reasons and in the case of collective punishments. When smaller or larger groups of Jews are met in the flat country, they can be liquidated by divisional units or be massed in the ghettos near bigger villages designated for that purpose, where they can be handed over to the civilian authority or the SD.

At Mirgorod, the 62nd Infantry Division executed "the entire Jewish population (168 people) for associating with partisans". At Novomoskovsk, the 444th Security Division reported that they had killed "305 bandits, 6 women with rifles (Flintenweiber), 39 prisoners-of-war and 136 Jews". In revenge for a partisan attack that had killed one German soldier, the Ersatz-Brigade 202 "as an act of retaliation shot 20 Jews from the villages of Bobosjanka and Gornostajewka and burnt down 5 Jew-houses". Even more extreme was the case in Serbia, where the majority of the Jews there were murdered by the Wehrmacht, not the SS.

Soviet officer Hersh Gurewicz recounts the horrors he witnessed while in the army. At the town of Rudnia, while active as a partisan, he described the body of a woman, "The body of a woman lay in the street. She was blonde, young, and must have been pretty, but her arms, extended upward, had no hands, and her legs had been cut off above the knees. Someone had slit her torso from navel to crotch with a bayonet or knife."

At Šabac in Dulag 183, a German transit camp for POWs in World War II Serbia, which opened in September 1941 (and closed in September 1944), Partisan POWs and members of their families were held. It is estimated that more than 5,000 persons were executed, not counting Jews and Roma people. "Central European Jewish refugees, mostly Austrians, were shot by troops of predominantly Austrian origin in retaliation for casualties inflicted by Serbian partisans on the German Army". The orders issued by Field Marshal Wilhelm Keitel in September 1941 called for the German Army to shoot 100 Serbs for every German soldier killed by the Serb guerrillas and did not call for Jews to be singled out. Due to rampant antisemitism in the German officer corps, Serbian Jews were scapegoated and targeted for mass retaliatory shootings. German historian Jürgen Förster, a leading expert on the subject of Wehrmacht war crimes, argued the Wehrmacht played a key role in the Holocaust and it is wrong to ascribe the Shoah as solely the work of the SS while the Wehrmacht were a more or less passive and disapproving bystander.

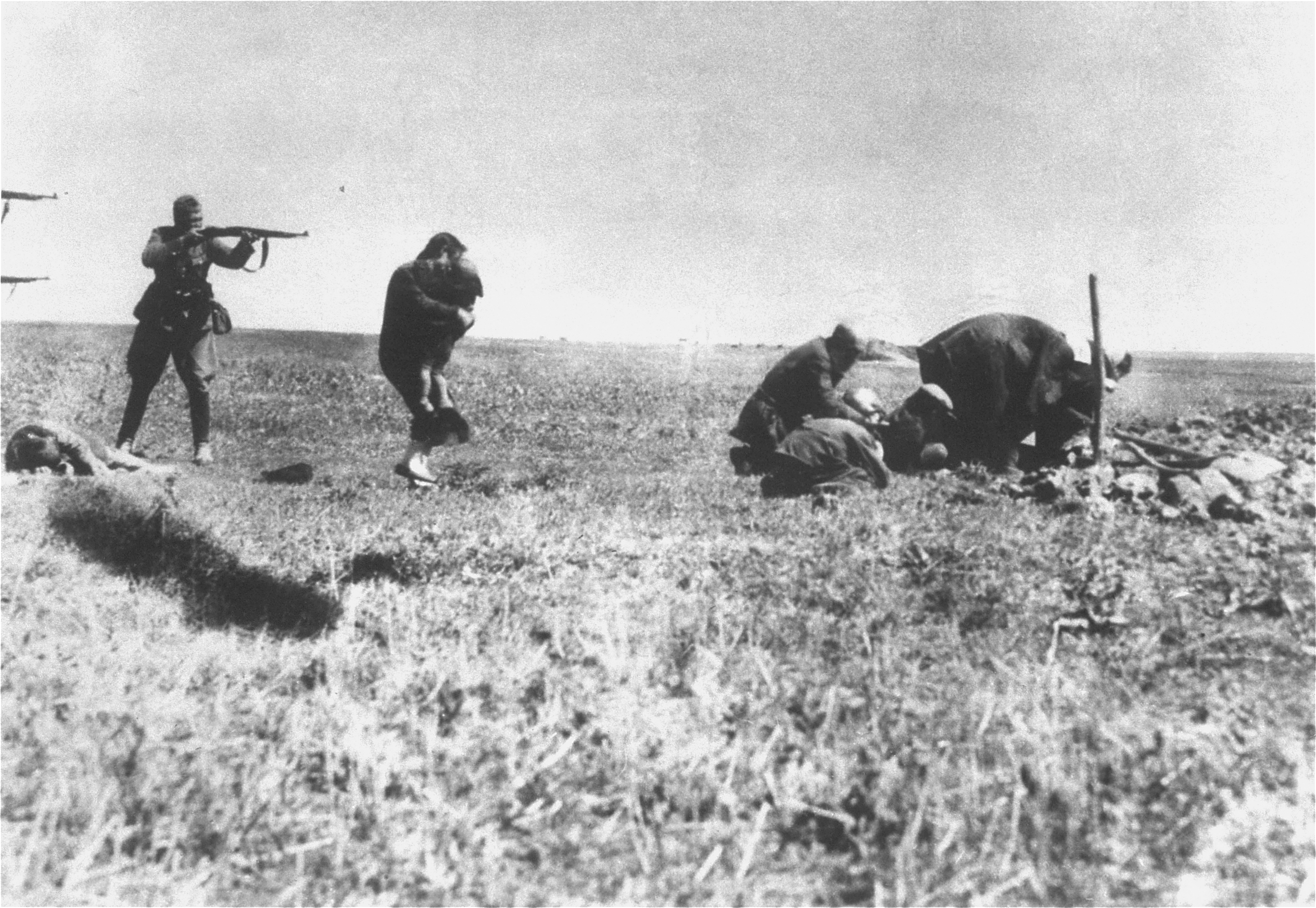
Einsatzgruppen murder Jews in Ivanhorod, Ukraine, 1942.

The Wehrmacht also worked very closely with the Einsatzgruppen in murdering members of the Jewish population of the Soviet Union. On October 10, 1941, General Walther von Reichenau drafted an order to be read to the troops under his command stating that: "the soldier must achieve full understanding of the necessity for a harsh but just vengeance against Jewish subhumanity." Upon hearing of Reichenau's Severity Order, Field Marshal Gerd von Rundstedt, the commander of Army Group South announced his "complete agreement" with it, and sent out a circular to all of the Army generals under his command urging them to send out their own versions of the Severity Order, which would impress upon the troops the need to exterminate Jews.

General Erich von Manstein, in an order to his troops on 20 November 1941 stated:

Jewry is the middleman between the enemy at our rear and the still fighting remnants of the Red Army and the Red leadership; more than in Europe, it [Jewry] occupies all key posts of the political leadership and administration, of trade and crafts and forms the nucleus for all disquiet and possible revolts. The Jewish-Bolshevist system must be exterminated once and for all.

On 6 July 1941 Einsatzkommando 4b of Einsatzgruppe C – which was operating in Tarnopol at the time – sent a report which noted "Armed forces surprisingly welcome hostility against the Jews". On 8 September 1941 Einsatzgruppe D reported that relations with the German Army were "excellent". Franz Walter Stahlecker of Einsatzgruppe A wrote in September 1941 that Army Group North had been exemplary in co-operating with his men in murdering Jews and that relations with the Fourth Panzer Army commanded by General Erich Hoepner were "very close, almost cordial".

=== Crimes against Soviet POWs ===
The Geneva Convention relative to the Treatment of Prisoners of War had been signed by Germany and most other countries in 1929, while the USSR and Japan did not sign until after the war (the final version of the Third Geneva Convention of 1949). This meant that Germany was legally obliged to treat all POWs according to it, while in turn, Germans captured by the Red Army could not expect to be treated in such a manner. The Soviet Union and Japan did not treat prisoners of war in accordance with the Geneva Convention. While the Wehrmacht's prisoner-of-war camps for inmates from the west generally satisfied the humanitarian requirement prescribed by international law, prisoners from Poland (which never capitulated) and the USSR were incarcerated under significantly worse conditions.

By December 1941, more than 2.4 million Soviet Red Army troops had been taken prisoner. These men suffered from malnutrition and diseases such as typhus that resulted from the Wehrmacht's failure to provide sufficient food, shelter, proper sanitation and medical care. Prisoners were regularly subject to summary execution, torture, mutilation, beatings and humiliation. All Jews, commissars, "intellectuals" and Muslims serving in the Red Army were either executed by the Wehrmacht or handed over to the SS to be shot.

The Muslim POWs were shot because they were circumcised, and therefore might be Jewish; it was felt to be safer to simply shoot all circumcised POWs rather run the risk that a Jewish POW might escape execution by claiming to be a Muslim. Reflecting the close co-operation between the Wehrmacht and the SS was an Einsatzgruppen report, which read:

In Borispol, following a demand by the Commandant of the local P/W camp, a platoon of Sonderkommando 4 shot 752 Jewish prisoners of war on 14 October and 356 on 16 October 1941 including several commissars and 78 wounded Jews handed over by the camp medical officer.

According to a RHSA report of 5 December 1941, the Wehrmacht had, since 22 June, handed over to the Einsatzgruppen 16,000 Soviet POWs to be liquidated.

Between the launching of Operation Barbarossa in the summer of 1941 and the following spring, 2.8 million of the 3.2 million prisoners taken died while in German hands. The German failure to attain their anticipated victory in the East led to significant shortages of labor for German war production and, beginning in 1942, prisoners of war in the eastern POW camps – primarily Soviets – were seen as a source of slave labor to keep Germany's wartime economy running.

On 6 August 1941, the OKW declared that Soviet POWs capable of work were to receive 2,200 calories/day and those not capable of work 2,040 calories/day. On 21 October 1941, the OKW ordered a huge reduction in the food rations for Soviet POWs, with POWs incapable of work henceforth to receive only 1,490 calories/day. In a meeting of senior generals called at Orša on 13 November 1941, the Army's First quarter-master General Eduard Wagner stated "Non-working prisoners of war in the camps are to starve".

5.7 million Soviet soldiers were taken prisoner during the war, of whom at least 3.3 million (58 percent of the total) died in captivity.

According to the Encyclopedia of Camps and Ghettos, it was typical for camps devoted to armaments production to be run by the branch of the Wehrmacht that used the products. Many places used Luftwaffe guards in concentration camps. In 1944, many Wehrmacht soldiers were transferred to the SS-Totenkopfverbände to alleviate personnel shortages in concentration camps.

In numerous documented instances, captured Soviet soldiers were subjected to torture and mutilation. They were branded with red-hot irons, had body parts such as eyes, ears, hands, fingers, and tongues cut out, their stomachs ripped open, were repeatedly bayoneted while alive, torn apart after being tied to tanks, and burned or buried alive.

== North Africa ==
Newer research has exposed Wehrmacht war crimes in North Africa. This opposes the term "War without hate" which is used by some authors to describe the North African Campaign.

Giordana Terracina writes that: "On April 3, the Italians recaptured Benghazi and a few months later the Afrika Korps led by Rommel was sent to Libya and began the deportation of the Jews of Cyrenaica in the concentration camp of Giado and other smaller towns in Tripolitania. This measure was accompanied by shooting, also in Benghazi, of some Jews guilty of having welcomed the British troops, on their arrival, treating them as liberators."

Jews from all around Cyrenaica and Benghazi were deported into Italy for forced labour. At the Giado concentration camp, a survivor by the name of Sion Burbea testifies that he witnessed Erwin Rommel inspecting their work at the camp.

Some historians directly connect Rommel with the war crimes of the Wehrmacht in North Africa. According to German historian Wolfgang Proske, Rommel forbade his soldiers from buying anything from the Jewish population of Tripoli, used Jewish slave labour and commanded Jews to clear out minefields by walking on them ahead of his forces. Proske also claims that Jews in Tripoli were later sent to Concentration Camps.

The Wehrmacht's persecution of Jews continued into 1942. According to the publication Jewish Communities of the World edited by Anthony Lerman, in 1942 during the German occupation, the Benghazi quarter that housed the Jewish population was plundered and 2000 Jews were deported across the desert, out of which approximately one fifth had perished. Jews in Benghazi were also victims of a pogrom in 1942. The Moment Magazine reports: "on orders from the German military commander, the Axis forces, in 1942, plundered Jewish shops and deported 2,600 Benghazi Jews to Giado".

Robert Satloff writes in his book Among the Righteous: Lost Stories from the Holocaust's Long Reach into Arab Lands that as the German and Italian forces retreated across Libya towards Tunisia, the Jewish population became victims upon which they released their anger and frustration. According to Satloff, Afrika Korps soldiers plundered Jewish property all along the Libyan coast. This violence and persecution only came to an end with the arrival of General Montgomery in Tripoli on January 23, 1943. German historian Clemens Vollnhals writes that the use of Jews by Afrika Korps as forced labour is barely known, but it did happen alongside persecution of Jewish population (although on smaller scale than in Europe) and some of the labourers were worked to death.

The persecution of Jews by the Wehrmacht continued into Tunisia. According to several historians, allegations and stories that associate Rommel and the Afrika Korps with the harassing and plundering of Jewish gold and property in Tunisia are usually known under the name "Rommel's treasure" or "Rommel's gold". Other historians, however, state that Rommel had nothing to do with the treasure, and that "Rauff's treasure" would be a more appropriate name. When the Wehrmacht entered Tunisia, they ordered the establishment of a Judenrat and Jews were subject to forced labour. 2,000 Jewish men were forcefully conscripted, and a few thousand more would be conscripted later on. This forced labour was used in extremely dangerous situations near targets of bombing raids, facing hunger and violence.

== Rape ==
=== Eastern Front ===
German soldiers used to brand the bodies of captured partisan women – and other women as well – with the words "Whore for Hitler's troops" and rape them. Following their capture some German soldiers vividly bragged about committing rape and rape-homicide. Susan Brownmiller argues that rape played a pivotal role in the Nazis' aim to conquer and destroy people they considered inferior, such as Jews, Russians, and Poles. An extensive list of rapes committed by German soldiers was compiled in the so-called "Molotov Note" in 1942. Brownmiller points out that Nazis used rape as a weapon of terror.

Sexual violence against Soviet women by German soldiers was widespread on the Eastern Front. In some occupied localities, nearly all women were raped by German soldiers, and in several instances, entire military units participated in extreme acts of sexual violence. In early August 1941, the command of the German Ninth Army reported a notable increase in incidents of plundering and rape, even within the combat zone.

Examples of mass rapes in Soviet Union committed by German soldiers include:

- Borisov: German soldiers raped and brutally murdered more than 36 women and girls. Among the victims was a 16-year-old girl named L. I. Melchukova, who was raped, tortured, and killed by having her breasts cut off and being nailed to boards.
- Smolensk: German command opened a brothel for officers in which hundreds of women and girls were driven by force, often by arms and hair.
- Lviv: 32 women working in a garment factory were raped and murdered by German soldiers, in a public park. A priest trying to stop the atrocity was murdered.
- Lviv: German soldiers raped Jewish girls, who were murdered after getting pregnant.

It is estimated that over a million children were born to Soviet women, fathered by German soldiers.

Author Ursula Schele, estimated in the Journal "Zur Debatte um die Ausstellung Vernichtungskrieg. Verbrechen der Wehrmacht 1941–1944" that one in ten women raped by German soldiers would have become pregnant, and therefore it is probable that up to ten million women in the Soviet Union could have been raped by the Wehrmacht.

Other sources estimate that rapes of Soviet women by the Wehrmacht range up to 10,000,000 incidents, with between 750,000 and 1,000,000 children being born as a result.

In German-occupied Russia, rapes were only a concern of the occupying authorities if they undermined military discipline. Since 1941, rape was theoretically punishable with the death sentence, although rapes were rarely prosecuted in practice and rapes by Germans of non-German women were not taken seriously, nor was it punishable by death, especially in the eastern European territories. In October 1940 the laws on rape were changed, making it a "petitioned crime" – that is a crime for which punishment had to be requested. Historian Christa Paul writes that this resulted in "a nearly complete absence of prosecution and punishment for rape". There were rape cases in the east where the perpetrators were sentenced if the rape were highly visible, damaging to the image of the German Army and the courts were willing to pass a condemning verdict against the accused.

According to the historian Regina Mühlhäuser, the Wehrmacht also used sexual violence and undressing in numerous cases of interrogations. Mühlhäuser adds that the number of illegitimate children born in the occupied regions did not exceed the prewar time. She comes to the conclusion that rapes on the Eastern front were not singular cases but has to admit that the state of source material is very poor.

There were rapes committed by soldiers of the Wehrmacht forces against Jewish women and girls during the Invasion of Poland. Rapes were also committed against Polish women and girls during mass executions carried out primarily by the Volksdeutscher Selbstschutz, which were accompanied by Wehrmacht soldiers and on territory under the administration of the German military, the rapes were carried out before shooting the female captives.

Only one case of rape was prosecuted by a German court during the military campaign in Poland, the case of gang rape committed by three soldiers against women of the Jewish Kaufmann family in Busko-Zdrój; however, the German judge sentenced the guilty for Rassenschande – shame against the [German] race as defined by the racial policy of Nazi Germany – and not rape.

According to the historian Maren Röger, members of the Wehrmacht, alongside SS and police units, frequently committed rapes against local Polish and Jewish women during the 1939 invasion of Poland. Although Nazi military leadership officially forbade sexual violence to maintain discipline and prevent propaganda damage, military courts and officers rarely prosecuted offenders, often dismissing or minimizing reported incidents. Analysis of soldiers' field post letters (Feldpostbriefe) from the initial phase of the occupation indicates widespread disciplinary breakdowns, including documented cases of harassment, rape, and the exploitation of Polish and Jewish women assigned to forced labor.

Sites of arrest, including prisons, camps, and Jewish ghettos, served as primary "spaces of violence" where Wehrmacht and occupation authorities committed acts of rape and sexual blackmail. Historian Maren Röger notes that Jewish women were particularly vulnerable to unpunished sexual violence because they were stripped of basic rights, creating a legal environment of total impunity for German perpetrators. Furthermore, low-ranking officials frequently used unauthorized searches, seizures, and uniform-based authority to extort sexual favors from Polish civilians in exchange for documents, employment, or protection from deportation.

According to the State Commission for Investigation of Crimes Committed by the Occupation Forces and their Collaborators German soldiers committed 772 recorded acts of rape during the Axis occupation of Serbia.

=== Western Front ===
Rape, while officially forbidden, was allowed in practice by the German military in eastern and southeastern Europe, while northern and western countries were relatively spared.

Though not on the same scale as the rapes committed by German soldiers on the Eastern Front, rape still occurred in Western and Northern countries. A Dutch woman testified that she witnessed a Dutch girl being raped by a German soldier during the German occupation of the Netherlands.

According to professors of Regional State Archives in Hamar, following the German invasion of Norway and during the German occupation of Norway, German soldiers committed numerous rapes against Norwegian women at gunpoint with impunity, while the local police ignored the reports of the rapes.

During the Battle of the Bulge, a German soldier from the 2nd Panzer Division raped a fifteen-year-old Belgian girl in the small town of Hargimont, brutally suppressing her resistance with a helmet, while other soldiers committed murder in the same town.

In his book Sex Crimes Under the Wehrmacht, author David Raub Snyder stated that a large number of Italian, French, and even German women were raped by Wehrmacht soldiers during the war. He argued that there is no evidence to suggest that non-Slavic women were spared from rape by German soldiers any more than Slavic women.

In France, there were some rapes in 1940 immediately after the invasion and then very few cases until 1944, when the number of cases spiked. The German command initially worked to reduce the number of rapes committed, because rapes during World War I had harmed the reputation of the German army. In 1944 the rapes were increasingly tolerated by the German hierarchy and occurred alongside massacres and looting, typically during anti-partisan operations. A photograph of a woman being gang-raped was included in the "Hitler's Crimes" exhibit displayed in Paris in 1945.

During the German occupation of the British Channel Islands, some German soldiers were charged with rape.

=== Military justice ===
Birgit Beck, in her work Rape: The Military Trials of Sexual Crimes Committed by Soldiers in the Wehrmacht, 1939–1944, describes the leniency in punishing sex crimes by German authorities in the East, at the same time pointing out heavy punishments applied in the West. If a soldier who committed a rape was subsequently convicted by a court-martial, he would usually be sentenced to four years in prison. The German penal code was also valid for soldiers in war. Until 1944, 5,349 soldiers of the Wehrmacht on all fronts were sentenced because of indecency offence "Sittlichkeitsvergehen" or rape "Notzucht". Historian Mühlhäuser believed that sexual assault was not an exception but common, and that the actual number of rapes committed by German soldiers are without question much greater. Snyder noted that the lenient sentences imposed on German soldiers charged with rape were not unique to Eastern Front, as many courts also handed down light punishments in cases involving the rape of non-Slavic women, including French, Italian, and German women.

Although surviving German military and court records document specific prosecutions in occupied Poland, historians emphasize that the vast majority of rapes went unreported. Victims rarely came forward due to social stigma, fear of invasive medical examinations, and a deep distrust of the German judicial system, which routinely imposed extreme punishments on Polish civilians for minor infractions. In court, German soldiers frequently avoided severe penalties by blaming alcohol intoxication or discrediting Polish accusers as anti-German provocateurs. German courts primarily prosecuted sexual violence only when public awareness threatened military discipline or the reputation of the occupation forces, while imposing significantly lighter sentences on German offenders compared to non-German populations.

=== Wehrmacht brothel system ===
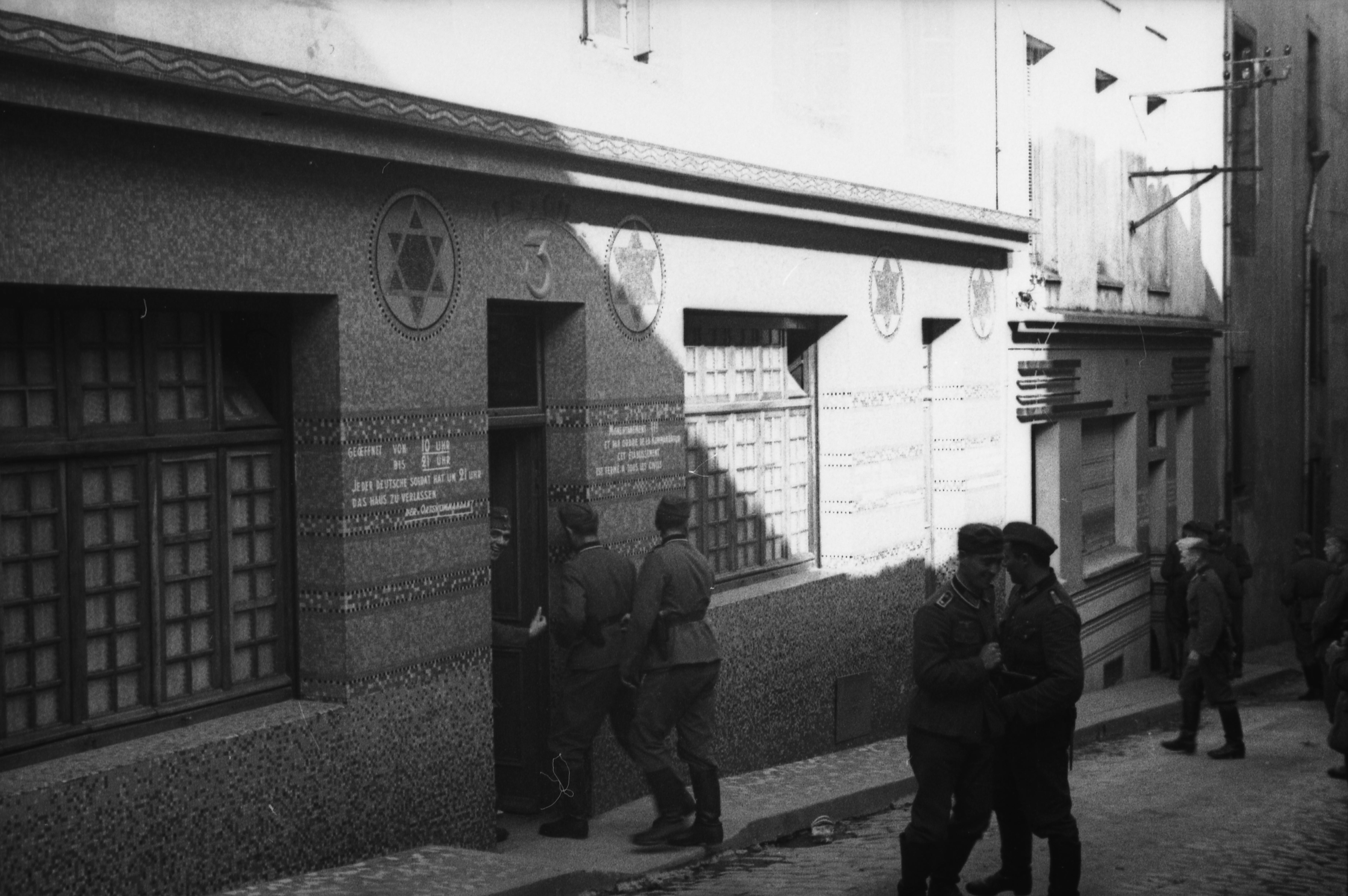
A military brothel (Soldatenbordell) in Brest, France, housed in what had been a synagogue

Under the German occupation, a widespread system of sexual slavery (forced prostitution) was instituted. The Wehrmacht also ran brothels where women were forced to work. The reason for establishing these brothels was the German officials' fear of venereal disease and onanism (masturbation). The Oberfeldarzt der Wehrmacht (Chief Field Doctor of the Wehrmacht) drew attention to "the danger of [the] spread of homosexualism".

On 3 May 1941, the Foreign Ministry of the Polish Government in Exile in London issued a document describing the mass raids carried out in Polish cities with the aim of capturing young women, who were later forced to work in brothels attended by German officers and soldiers.

In the Soviet Union women were kidnapped by German forces for prostitution; one report by the International Military Tribunal stated that "in the city of Smolensk the German Command opened a brothel for officers in one of the hotels into which hundreds of women and girls were driven; they were mercilessly dragged down the street by their arms and hair."

Yugoslavian women were reportedly placed into brothels, and a 1941 document from the Osijek archives discussing plans for multiple brothels in Osijek, as well as the required sanitation procedures, has also been found.

=== Trials ===
The Nuremberg trials did not prosecute anyone for rape or other sexual violence; rape was defined as a crime against humanity, but prosecutors deemed that such crimes had "no nexus to war".

== Human experimentation ==
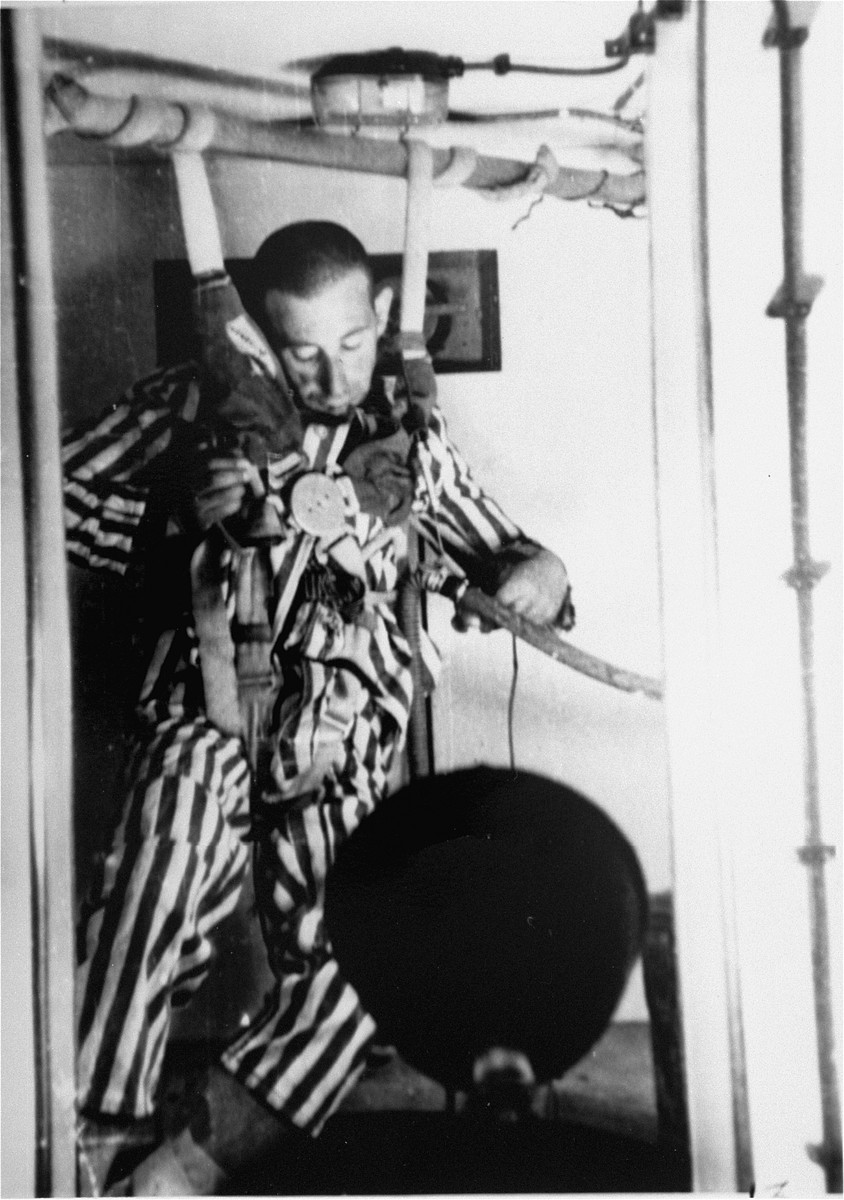
A victim loses consciousness during a depressurization experiment at Dachau by Luftwaffe doctor Sigmund Rascher, 1942

Throughout the war Germany engaged in numerous experiments on human prisoners and POWs. The Wehrmacht had full knowledge of those experiments, and performed some of its own. It provided assistance regarding:

- High altitude tests
- Drinking seawater
- Freezing of the human body
- Typhus research.

In many cases the test subjects, even if they survived, were murdered afterwards to study any changes within their bodies that happened during the experiment.

Examples of experiments conducted by the Wehrmacht include:

- Experiments on homosexuals: Wehrmacht doctors wanted to "cure" homosexuality by hormone treatments and putting homosexuals into battle.
- Experiments on prisoners at Auschwitz-Birkenau by doctor Emil Kaschub. Kaschub came from Upper Silesia and was an ensign in the Wehrmacht (he was not a member of the SS). He performed experiments on the limbs of middle-aged and young prisoners; they would deliberately be infected with various toxic substances, which caused sores, abscesses and pain. The condition of the patients would be photographed by Kaschub every few days and liquid from their wounds collected. The probable motive for those experiments was to find out how soldiers made themselves sick in order to escape service in the Wehrmacht.
- In August 1941, the staff doctor assigned to the Sixth Army, Gerhart Panning, learned about captured Soviet dumdum bullets by using Jewish POWs. To determine the effects of this type of ammunition on German soldiers, he decided to test them on other human beings after asking SS-Standartenführer (Colonel) and a member of the SD Paul Blobel for some "guinea pigs", (Jewish POWs).

== Biological warfare ==
During the war members of the Wehrmacht attempted to influence Hitler's decision to study biological warfare only regarding defense. The head of the Science Division of the Wehrmacht, Erich Schumann, urged the Führer that "America must be attacked simultaneously with various human and animal epidemic pathogens, as well as plant pests." Laboratory tests were prepared for the use of plague, anthrax, cholera and typhoid. The possibility of using foot and mouth disease against Britain was also studied.

== Postwar views ==
=== Evolving analysis ===
High-ranking Wehrmacht officers stood trial for war crimes. The Oberkommando der Wehrmacht (OKW) commander-in-chief, Field Marshal Wilhelm Keitel, and chief of operations staff Alfred Jodl were both indicted and tried for war crimes by the International Military Tribunal at Nuremberg through 1945–1946. They were convicted of all charges, sentenced to death and executed by hanging, although Jodl was acquitted post-mortem seven years later. While the tribunal declared that the Gestapo, SD and SS (including the Waffen-SS) were inherently criminal organizations, the court did not reach the same conclusion with the Wehrmacht General Staff and High Command.

The Nuremberg Trials at the end of World War II initially considered whether the Wehrmacht high command structure should be tried. However, the Oberkommando der Wehrmacht (OKW – High Command of the Armed Forces) was judged not to be a criminal organization under the legal grounds that because of very poor co-ordination between the German Army, Navy and Air Force high commands, which operated as more or less separate entities during the war, the OKW did not constitute an "organization" as defined by Article 9 of the constitution of the International Military Tribunal (IMT) which conducted the Nuremberg trials. This matter of legal definition has been misconstrued by German World War II veterans and others to mean that the IMT ruled that the OKW was not a "criminal organization" because the Wehrmacht committed no war crimes.

The prosecution of war crimes lost momentum during the 1950s as the Cold War intensified; both German states needed to establish armed forces and could not do so without trained officers and soldiers that had served in the Wehrmacht. German historiography in the 1950s viewed war crimes by German soldiers as exceptional rather than ordinary; soldiers were seen as victims of the Nazi regime. Traces of this attitude can still be seen in some German works today, which minimize the number of soldiers who took part in Nazi crimes. This was especially the case as the German public in the immediate post-war period were more interested in seeing themselves rather than others as victims. Thus the subject of Red Army atrocities against German civilians in 1944–45 received vastly more popular and historical interest in the 1950s than did the subject of Wehrmacht atrocities against Soviet civilians in 1941–44.

Beyond that, Operation Barbarossa had been portrayed in Germany as a "preventive war" forced on Germany by Soviet attack alleged to be planned for July 1941. This claim was widely believed in the Reich during the war, and indeed was so popular that as late as the 1950s some West German historians were still arguing Operation Barbarossa was a "preventive war". As a result of this view of Operation Barbarossa, for many Germans, violence inflicted by the Wehrmacht on Soviet civilians and POWs was seen as something that the Soviets had brought down on themselves, hence the absence of any guilt on the part of many Germans. Cold War priorities and taboos about revisiting the most unpleasant aspects of World War II meant that the Wehrmacht's role in war crimes was not seriously re-examined until the early 1980s.

In their memoirs, German Army generals claimed that the war had been a "clean war" on their part with the Army fighting because of the noble Prussian-German traditions, patriotism and a deep sense of honour and duty and that National Socialism had virtually no influence on the Army. In this version, almost all German war crimes were the work of the SS and any "excesses" committed by the Army were only the product of a long and bitter war and were no different from Allied war crimes. Very typical were the claims of one Infantry commander, who stated in his memoirs that all of the battles fought by his men were "always fairly conducted, though tough and bitter." Such claims were widely believed not only in Germany but abroad, with the British military historian Captain Basil Liddell Hart writing that "the German Army in the field on the whole observed the rules of war better than in 1914–18".

On 11 December 1979, the West German television show Report aired a documentary entitled "Crimes of the Wehrmacht in World War Two". The public's reaction was almost overwhelmingly negative, with World War II veterans leading a campaign to have the producer of Report fired for the "defamation" of German soldiers. This despite the fact – as the German historian Jürgen Förster was to write in 1989 – that the producers of the documentary had gone out of their way to be fair and unbiased.

In 1986, the German historian Hans Mommsen wrote about the role of the Wehrmacht under National Socialism:

The leadership of the Wehrmacht rather willingly made themselves into accomplices in the policy of extermination. It did this by generating the "criminal orders" and implementing them. By no means did they merely passively support the implementation of their concept, although there was a certain reluctance for reasons of military discipline and a few isolated protests. To construct a "causal nexus" over all this amounts in fact to steering away from the decisive responsibility of the military leadership and the bureaucratic elites.

British historian Ian Kershaw wrote that the genocide and extreme brutality used by the Nazis was their way of ensuring the Lebensraum ("living space") for the people who met the strict requirements of being part of Hitler's Aryan Herrenvolk ("Aryan master race") and the elimination of the Slavic people:

The Nazi revolution was broader than just the Holocaust. Its second goal was to eliminate Slavs from central and eastern Europe and to create a Lebensraum for Aryans. ... As Bartov (The Eastern Front; Hitler's Army) shows, it barbarised the German armies on the eastern front. Most of their three million men, from generals to ordinary soldiers, helped exterminate captured Slav soldiers and civilians. This was sometimes cold and deliberate murder of individuals (as with Jews), sometimes generalised brutality and neglect. ... German soldiers' letters and memoirs reveal their terrible reasoning: Slavs were 'the Asiatic-Bolshevik' horde, an inferior but threatening race.

In 1989, the British historian Richard J. Evans wrote that right from the beginning of the war against the Soviet Union, the Wehrmacht fought a genocidal war of "extreme brutality and barbarism". Evans noted that the Wehrmacht officers regarded the Russians as "sub-human", were from the time of the invasion of Poland in 1939 telling their troops that war was caused by "Jewish vermin", and explained to the troops that the war against the Soviet Union was a war to wipe out what were variously called "Jewish Bolshevik subhumans", the "Mongol hordes", the "Asiatic flood" and the "red beast".

Such views helped to explain why 3,300,000 of the 5,700,000 Soviet POWs taken by the Germans died in captivity. In 1992, Omer Bartov noted that the three leaders of the "new revisionism" in German history that sparked the Historikerstreit of the late 1980s were all in some ways seeking to promote the image of the Wehrmacht as a force for the good, and seeking to portray the Wehrmacht as a victim of the Allies rather the victimizer of the peoples of Europe, writing of "the bizarre inversion of the Wehrmacht's roles proposed by all three exponents of the new revisionism, whereby overtly or by implication the Army is transformed from culprit to saviour, from an object of hatred and fear to one of empathy and pity, from victimizer to victim". Specifically, Bartov noted that:

- Michael Stürmer's geographical interpretation of German history meant that Germany's "mission" in Central Europe was to serve as a bulwark against the Slavic menace from the East in both World Wars.
- Ernst Nolte's argument about a "causal nexus" with the National Socialist genocide as a logical, if extreme response to the horrors of Communism led to Wehrmacht crimes in the Soviet Union being portrayed as essentially justified. This was even more the case as Nolte insisted that Operation Barbarossa was as Hitler claimed a "preventive war", which meant that for Nolte, Wehrmacht war crimes were portrayed as a defensive response to the threat posed to Germany by the "Asiatic hordes".
- Andreas Hillgruber's call for historians to "identity" and "empathize" with German troops fighting on the Eastern Front in 1944–45 implicitly devalued the lives of those suffering and dying in the Holocaust, which was allowed to continue in part because the German troops held out for so long.

Bartov wrote that all three historians had in varying ways sought to justify and excuse Wehrmacht war crimes by depicting the Wehrmacht as engaging in a heroic battle for Western civilization, often using the same language as the Nazis such as referring to the Red Army as the "Asiatic hordes". Bartov ended that these sorts of arguments reflected a broader unwillingness of the part of some Germans to admit to what their Army did during the war. In 1998, the historian Jürgen Förster wrote that for too long most people have accepted at face value the self-serving claims made by generals like Erich von Manstein and Siegfried Westphal whose memoirs promoted the myth of the clean Wehrmacht, the notion the Wehrmacht had been a highly professional, apolitical force and its generals were victims of Adolf Hitler rather than his followers.

In reality, the Wehrmacht played a key role in the Holocaust in Eastern Europe and other war crimes. The claims promoted after the war that the Wehrmacht had been an "untarnished shield" with the Army somehow standing apart from the regime it served so loyally was a myth that no serious historian had taken seriously since the 1980s.

In 2019 the historian David W. Wildermuth noted that while the myth of the "clean Wehrmacht" has been largely dispelled among historians, it retains a following with the general public. He suggested that a reason for this is that few case studies have been published which identify specific units which were involved in war crimes.

=== Portrayal on film ===
In his 2004 essay "Celluloid Soldiers" about post-war German films, the Israeli historian Omer Bartov wrote that German films of the 1950s showed the average German soldier as a heroic victim: noble, tough, brave, honourable and patriotic, while fighting hard in a senseless war for a regime that he did not care for. The 08/15 film trilogy of 1954–55 concerns a sensitive young German soldier named Asch (Joachim Fuchsberger). No mention is ever made of the genocidal aspects of Germany's war in the East with instead the German soldiers being shown as the victims of a war that they can not fathom the reasons for. Bartov commented that given the intense indoctrination in the Wehrmacht about how the war against the Soviet Union was a war to destroy "Judeo-Bolshevism" that Asch would most definitely have known what they were fighting for.

The war on the Eastern Front was portrayed in a manner that suggested that all who fought in the war were equally victims, but since the focus in the 08/15 films is on the unit commanded by Asch inevitably the impression is given that it was German soldiers who were the primary victims of the war. The term 08/15 refers to a type of German machine gun used in World War I that was manufactured in such quantities that "08/15" (German: Nullachtfünfzehn) became German Army slang for anything was standard issue, which implied that Asch and the soldiers under his command were Everyman characters of the war on the Eastern Front. In Der Arzt von Stalingrad (The Doctor from Stalingrad) of 1958, dealing with German POWs in the Soviet Union, the Germans are portrayed as more civilized, humane and intelligent than the Soviets, who are shown for the most part as Mongol savages who brutalized the German prisoners.

Bartov wrote that the portrayal of the Soviet guards as mostly Asian shows disturbing affinities to war-time Nazi propaganda, where the Red Army was often described as "the Asiatic horde". A recurring theme in Der Arzt von Stalingrad was that the German soldiers were being punished for crimes that they had not committed. In the 1959 film Hunde, wolt ihr ewig leben? (Dogs, do you want to live forever?), which deals with the Battle of Stalingrad, the focus is on celebrating the heroism of the German soldiers in that battle, who are shown as valiantly holding out against overwhelming odds with no mention at all of what those soldiers were fighting for, namely National Socialist ideology or the Holocaust. Bartov noted that the clear impression that these films give is that the average German soldier who fought on the Eastern Front was a hero worthy of the highest admiration.

This period also saw a number of films that depicted the military resistance to Hitler. In Des Teufels General (The Devil's General) of 1954, Bartov commented that in this film, the German officer corps is shown as a group of fundamentally noble and honourable men who happened to be serving an evil regime made up of a small gang of gangsterish misfits totally unrepresentative of German society, which served to exculpate both the officer corps and by extension German society.

Bartov also wrote that German film-makers liked to show the heroic last stand of the 6th Army at Stalingrad, but none has so far showed the 6th Army's massive co-operation with the Einsatzgruppen in murdering Soviet Jews in 1941 during its march across Ukraine. Likewise, Bartov commented that German films tended to dwell on the suffering of the 6th Army during the Battle of Stalingrad and its aftermath without reflecting on the fact that it was the Germans who invaded the Soviet Union and that the Russians were fighting to defend their country.

Only with Jenseits des Krieges (released in the US as East of War) in 1996, a documentary directed by Ruth Beckermann dealing with the public's reaction to the exhibition "War of Extermination" in Vienna in 1995, did a German film admit to Wehrmacht war crimes being commonplace instead of an exception to the rule. Some veterans in Jenseits des Krieges denied that the German Army committed any war crimes at all while others express relief at long last that the truth has been told. One critic wrote of the veterans in Jenseits des Krieges that "Some are sorry for their brutality, while others rationalize such acts as shooting POWs, raping women and butchering Jewish people as part of what soldiers were expected to do".

=== Wehrmachtsausstellung ===
The Wehrmachtsausstellung (German: German Army exhibition) was the name for two exhibitions focusing on war crimes of the Wehrmacht committed on the Eastern Front from 1941 to 1944. They ran from 1995 to 1999 in the original form, and 2001 to 2004 in a revised form. The exhibitions were arranged by Hannes Heer and travelled to over 33 German and Austrian cities. They were instrumental in breaking down the Myth of the clean Wehrmacht in Germany.

=== Exhibition about the Wehrmacht in Poland in 1939 ===
The Wehrmachtsausstellung only covered the German presence in the Soviet Union between 1941 and 1945 and excluded the German occupation of Poland after September 1939. The Polish exhibition "Größte Härte ... Verbrechen der Wehrmacht in Polen September/Oktober 1939", a cooperative effort of the Polish Institute of National Remembrance and the German Historical Institute Warsaw was presented on 1 September 2004, in Poland. A German version was presented in 2005. It was scheduled to be shown in Nuremberg at the Documentation Center of the Nazi Party Rallying Grounds from 1 September 2007 to early 2008.

== Analysis of photos and letters ==
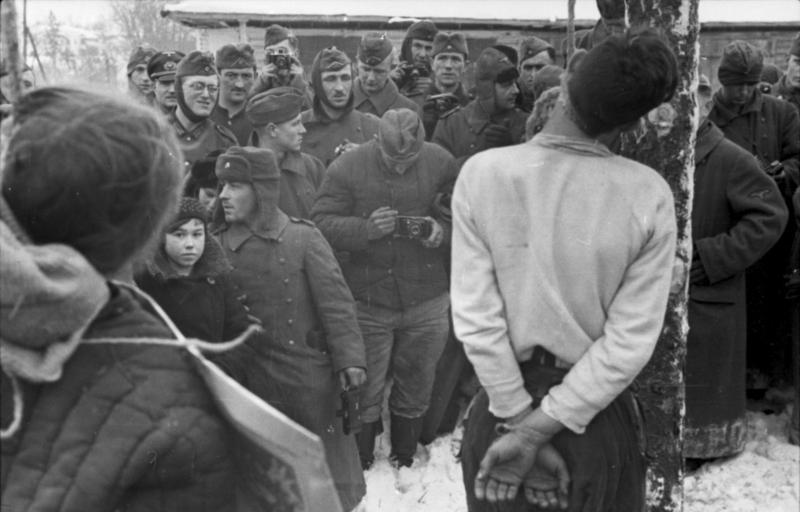
German soldiers photographing the hanging of USSR citizens accused of being partisans

The attitude of German soldiers towards atrocities committed on Jews and Poles in World War II was also studied using photographs and correspondence left after the war. Photographs serve as a valuable source of knowledge; taking them and making albums about the persecution of Jews was a popular custom among German soldiers. These pictures are not the official propaganda of the German state but represent personal experience. Their overall attitude is antisemitic.

German soldiers as well as police members took pictures of Jewish executions, deportations, humiliation and the abuse to which they were also subjected. According to researchers, pictures indicate the consent of the photographers to the abuses and murders committed. "This consent is the result of several factors, including the anti-Semitic ideology and prolonged, intensive indoctrination". Archival evidence as to the reaction to policies of racial extermination can also be traced in various letters that survived the war. Many of these archived letters from Wehrmacht soldiers often reflect the intensive indoctrination soldiers underwent. The following quote is from a letter written by a noncommissioned officer in the Wehrmacht who wrote home from the Eastern front in 1941:

The German people is deeply indebted to the Fuehrer, because if these animals, our enemies here, had reached Germany, murders of a nature not yet witnessed in the world would have occurred ... No newspaper can describe what we have seen. It verges on the unbelievable, and even the Middle Ages do not compare with what has transpired here. Reading Der Stuermer and observing its photos give only a limited impression of what we have seen here and of the crimes committed here by the Jews.

Judith Levin and Daniel Uziel state that this type of writing and opinion was very common in correspondence left by German soldiers, especially on the Eastern Front. Other samples of German soldiers' letters were sent home and copied during the war by a special Polish Home Army cell that infiltrated the German postal system. These letters have been analyzed by historians and the picture they paint is similar to views expressed by Levin and Uziel. Many soldiers wrote openly about the extermination of Jews and were proud of it. Support for "untermensch" and "master race" concepts were also part of the attitude expressed by German soldiers. Presented examples reflecting this trend include samples such as:

I'm one of those who are decreasing [the] number of partisans. I put them against the wall and everyone gets a bullet in his head, [a] very merry and interesting job. ...My point of view: this nation deserves only the knaut, only by it can they be educated; a part of them already experienced that; others still try to resist. Yesterday I had [the] possibility to see 40 partisans, something like that I had never encountered before. I became convinced that we are the masters, others are untermenschen.

Much more evidence of such trends and thoughts among Wehrmacht soldiers exists and is subject to research by historians.

The historians responsible for the exhibition assume that the anti-Semitic climate and propaganda in Nazi Germany had an immense impact on the entire population and emphasize the importance of the indoctrination.

== See also ==
- Chronicles of Terror
- Clean Wehrmacht myth
- Command responsibility
- German war crimes
- Genocide of the Soviet people
- Nazi crime
- Nazi concentration camps
- List of Axis personnel indicted for war crimes
- List of major perpetrators of the Holocaust
- List of Wehrmacht and Waffen-SS divisions that committed war crimes in Italy
- Soviet war crimes
- Allied war crimes
