= 267th Infantry Division =

- 267. Infanterie-Division
- Divisional insignia
- Active: August 1939 – August 1944
- Country: Nazi Germany
- Branch: Army
- Type: Infantry
- Size: Division
- Nickname: Horse's Head Division
- Engagements: World War II

The 267th Infantry Division (German: 267. Infanterie-Division) was a German division in World War II. Called the 'Horsehead' division because of its emblem, it took part in the Invasion of France in 1940, and Operation Barbarossa in 1941. The division was encircled and destroyed in July 1944.

== Operational history ==
The division was formed on 26 August 1939 in Hanover. After mobilisation it was posted to the Westwall on the border with France. It took part in the invasion of France in 1940, advancing through Belgium. On 28 May 1940 soldiers of the division carried out the Oignies massacre; the 487th Infantry Regiment used civilians as human shields during fighting near the village of Oignies in Nord Pas-de-Calais, then rounded up and shot 80 French civilians in front of the town hall, as well as captured British, French, and Moroccan troops who were too severely wounded to march to the rear. The incident is one of several war crimes committed by the Wehrmacht during the 1940 campaign.

From July 1940 to May 1941, it was responsible for guarding a part of the English Channel coast. In June 1941 it was a part of Operation Barbarossa, as part of Army Group Centre. It remained with this Army Group until it was encircled and destroyed in July 1944. Shortly afterwards it was officially dissolved.

== Commanding officers ==
- General der Panzertruppe Ernst Feßmann, 26 August 1939 – 1 June 1941;
- Generalmajor Friedrich-Karl von Wachter, 1 June 1941 – 10 November 1941;
- General der Artillerie Robert Martinek, 10 November 1941 – 1 January 1942;
- Generalmajor Karl Fischer, 1 January 1942 – 24 January 1942;
- Generalleutnant Friedrich Stephan, 24 January 1942 – 26 February 1942;
- Generalmajor Karl Fischer, 26 February 1942 – 31 March 1942 †;
- Generalleutnant Friedrich Stephan, 31 March 1942 – 8 June 1943;
- Generalleutnant Otto Drescher, 8 June 1943 – 13 August 1944 †.
