= Oignies and Courrières massacre =

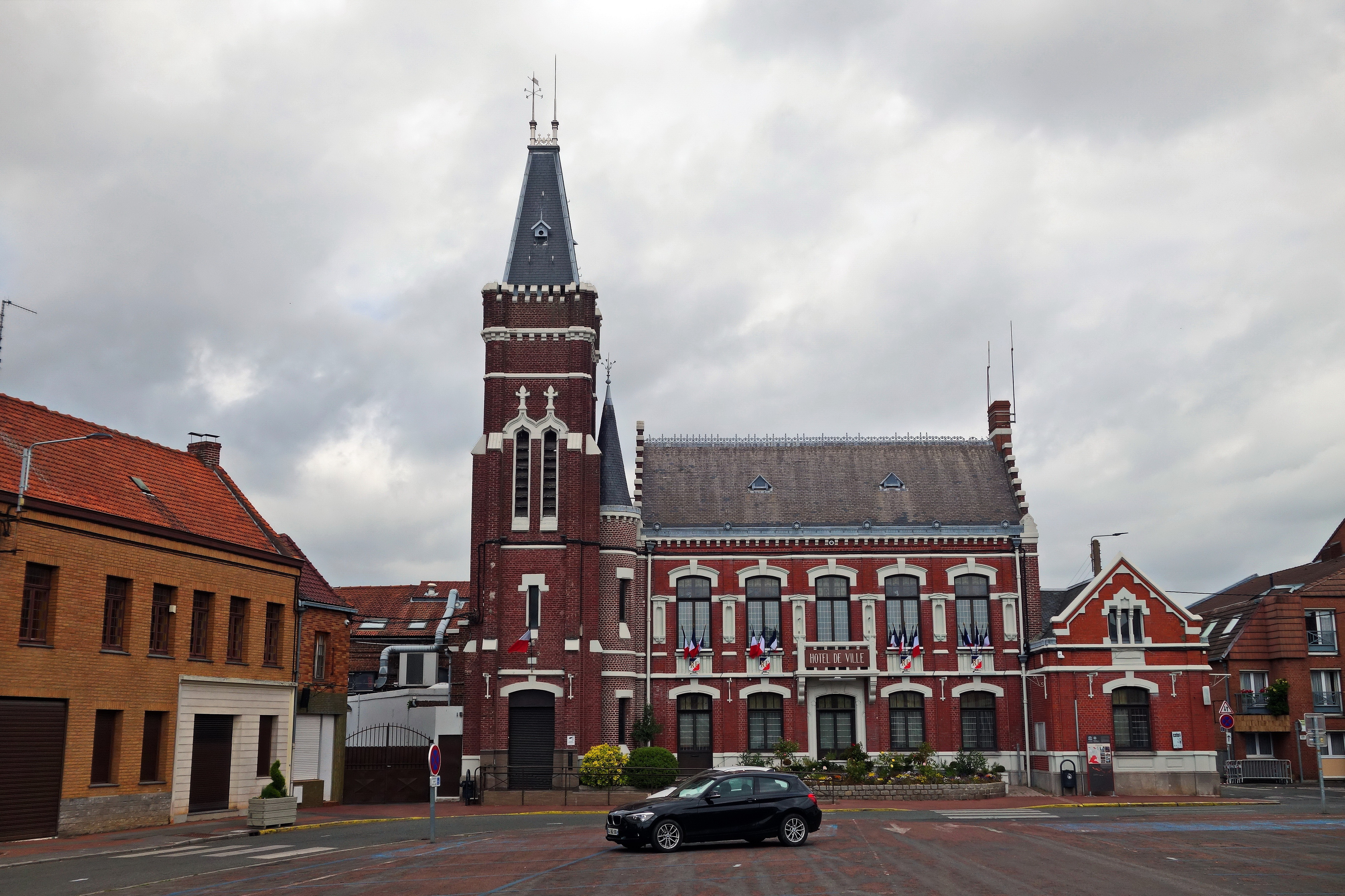
Modern-day view of the town hall in Oignies

Occurring amid the Battle of France, the Oignies and Courrières massacre involved mass killings of French civilians in the adjacent towns of Oignies and Courrières in Nord-Pas de Calais on 27–28 May 1940. The number of victims is reckoned between 114 or 124. The 487th Infantry Regiment of the 267th Infantry Division in the Wehrmacht was responsible for the atrocity. The massacre was one of the largest to occur during the Battle of France. Altogether, it is thought a total of 500 French civilians were murdered by German forces in Nord-Pas de Calais in May 1940.

== Background ==
Map showing German operations in Northern France in late May and early June

In response to the German invasion of Poland, France and the United Kingdom declared war on Nazi Germany in September 1939. The Polish campaign was accompanied by widespread atrocities against civilians including numerous large-scale massacres of civilians including both ethnic Poles and Jews.

After a period of relative inaction on the Western Front, German forces launched a major offensive against France on 10 May 1940 with a simultaneous attack through neutral Belgium, Luxembourg, and the Netherlands. French forces supported by the small British Expeditionary Force (BEF) surged into Northern and Central Belgium as prescribed by the Dyle Plan to halt the German advance. Although fighting some successful engagements, they were soon outflanked as a result of an unexpected German breakthrough to the south and forced to retreat westwards back into France. As early as 21 May, German forces reached the North Sea coast near Abbeville cutting off a large proportion of French, British, and Belgian forces in a shrinking pocket along the coast. On the southern side of the pocket, German forces began to push north-eastwards towards the major city of Lille through the region around the towns of Arras, Lens, Béthune, and Douai.

Courrières and Oignies were two small towns situated in the important coal mining basin approximately 20 kilometres (12 mi) south-east of Lille. A short distance apart, they were separated by the Deûle canal with Oignies on its western bank and Courrières a short distance on the east. (Note: Courrières was best known in France at the time as the location of a massive 1906 mining disaster in which 1,200 miners had been killed.) The coal mining industry had drawn on immigrant workers in the interwar period including from Poland and French Algeria.

== Massacre ==
=== Courrières, 27-28 May 1940 ===
German forces reached Courrières on 24 May as they moved towards Lille. They attempted to cross the Deûle canal across the only intact bridge known locally as the Pont de la Batterie. This was defended by French troops predominantly from North and West Africa serving with the 106th Colonial Infantry Regiment and 11th Zouaves Regiment as well as the BEF's 2/5 Battalion, Sherwood Foresters. Several attempted crossings were successfully repelled on 24 and 26 May. Unable to achieve a crossing, the German units instead concluded that their failure was caused by civilians at Courrières passing information to the French and the possible involvement of francs-tireurs.

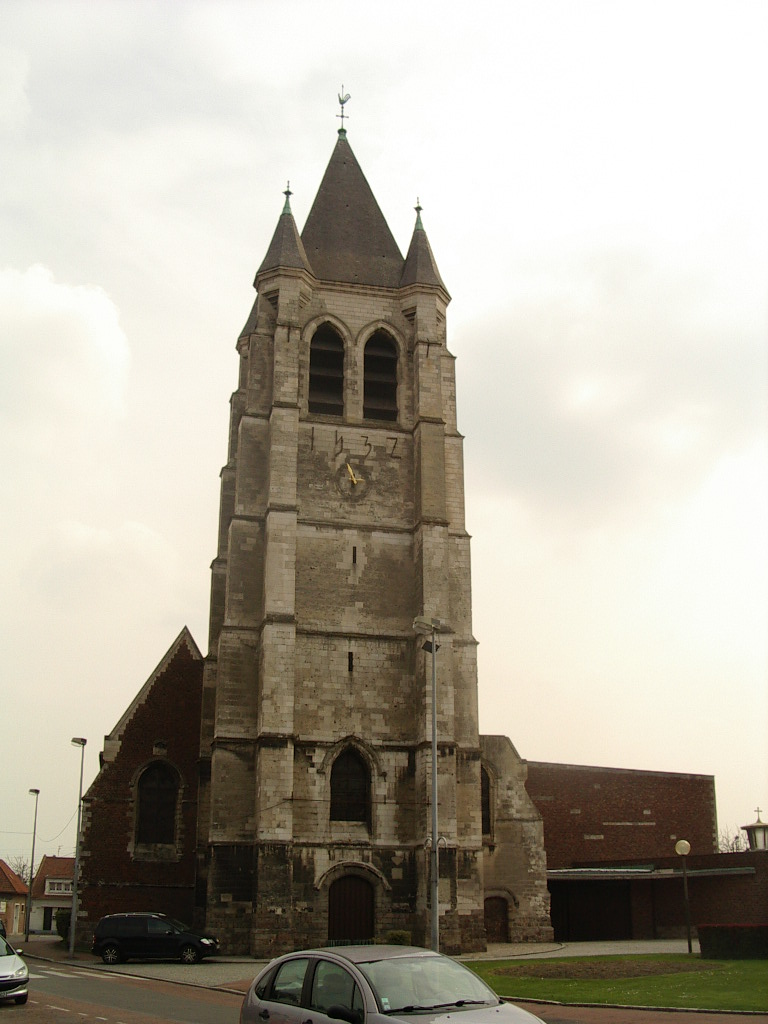
Modern-day view of the Église Saint-Piat in Courrières, dating to 1534. The bell tower alone survived the burning in May 1940.

Most of the civilian population in Courrières had sought shelter from the fighting in cellars and basements. German soldiers nonetheless massacred four local civilians on the street on 27 May. Early the following morning, they took roughly a dozen civilians hostage and attempted to use them as human shields to protect German artillery pieces near the bridge. They also systematically began to burn the town. The historian Jean-Marie Fossier wrote that soldiers went "street to street" throwing incendiary grenades into houses as they passed. According to post-war estimates, 951 buildings were totally destroyed and 220 partially destroyed out of a pre-war total of 1,605. Three schools, the town hall, several other civic buildings, and the historic local church were among the buildings destroyed. Several more civilians were shot, bayonetted, or died in the fire. Fossier noted that "In one courtyard, nearly 20 men were gathered. Several were retirees. One had been wounded by a bullet. There were also several Algerians. They were made to dig a large pit after a pretend judgment." They were then killed with machine-gun fire and buried. Later excavation suggested that some had been buried alive.

Altogether, between 38 and 46 civilians were killed by German forces in Courrières. 22 of these were inhabitants of the town, while the remainder were refugees caught up in the Exodus.

=== Oignies, 28 May 1940 ===
As soon as they entered Oignies on 28 May, German forces continued the atrocities begun in Courrières. The historian Fabrice Virgili writes that "as soon as the German soldiers surrounded the area, executions, pillaging, and destruction followed. Eighty inhabitants, including ten women, were killed, shot for the most part, and the village was practically destroyed." A number of women were raped. Among those killed were the Polish priest Jean Chodura and several Polish mineworkers in Oignies and nearby Ostricourt. Many of the dead were aged and invalids. The historian Jean-Marie Fossier write: "In each street, the same scenes were repeated. Houses were gone through from top to bottom, the people thrown violently into the streets, beaten with blows. The men were sometimes machine-gunned or bayonetted in front of the horrified eyes of women and children; others were taken and everywhere were found tortured corpses." A few captured Moroccan and Senegalese soldiers were also killed, with some found decapitated.

The victims at Oignies were largely local residents who accounted for 70 of the dead. Aside from four unknown individuals and some refugees from the surrounding region, there were also a number of prisoners of war. 400 buildings were burnt at Oignies.

== Commemoration ==
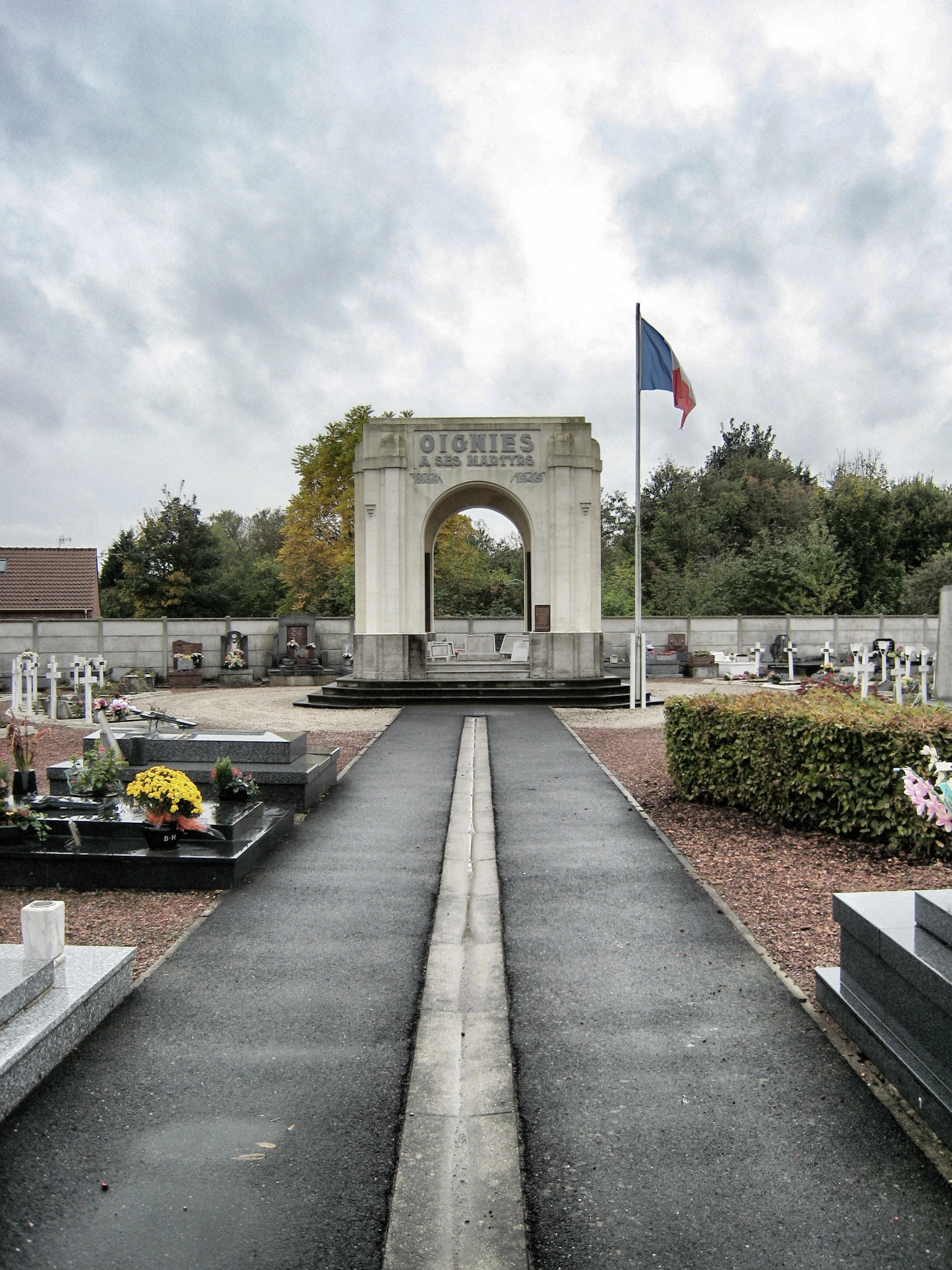
Modern-day view of the mausoleum at Oignies

=== Aftermath ===
The atrocities at Oignies and Courrières were not the only massacres of French and Belgian civilians committed in the course of the campaign in May and June 1940. Across Nord-Pas de Calais, the SS Panzer Division Totenkopf perpetrated a number of massacres of 92 people at Aubigny-en-Artois and 45 at Vandelicourt both on 22 May, and a further 48 at Beuvry on 24 May. Across the Belgian frontier at Vinkt, Wehrmacht troops of the 225th Infantry Division murdered 86 civilians on 27 May.

The victims in Oignies are commemorated by a mausoleum inaugurated in 1947 by the French President Vincent Auriol who also declared it a "martyr town" (ville martyre). A major road was renamed rue des 80 fusiliés. Courrières was awarded the Croix de Guerre with Palms in 1948 and a memorial was inaugurated in 1964.

=== Trials ===
The officer accused of instigating the massacre was Hauptmann Horst Kolrep. He was brought before the Tribunal at Metz in October 1950. Three other men, Ferdinand Holscher, Hans Kurt Höcker, and Paul Hemmers, were tried in absentia. All four individuals were convicted and Kolrep was sentenced to death. Holscher and Höcker were both sentenced to death, while Hemmers received a 20-year sentence. Kolrep was executed on 1 June 1951.

== See also ==
- Siege of Lille (1940)
- Vinkt massacre - massacre of Belgian civilians (26-28 May 1940)
- Le Paradis massacre - massacre of British prisoners of war (27 May 1940)
- Wormhoudt massacre - massacre of British and French prisoners of war (28 May 1940)
- Polish immigration to the Nord-Pas-de-Calais coalfield
