= Ernst Feßmann =

German general (1881–1962)

- Born: 6 January 1881; Pfersee, Bavaria
- Died: 25 October 1962 (aged 81); Pullach, Bavaria
- Military career
- Allegiance: German Empire; Weimar Republic; Nazi Germany
- Branch: German Army
- Service years: 1900–1937, 1939–1943
- Rank: General der Panzertruppe
- Commands: 3rd Panzer Division
- Conflicts: World War I World War II

Ernst Feßmann (6 January 1881 – 25 October 1962) was a German general of the Heer (German Army) who led the 267th Infantry Division in the early stages of World War II. Prior to the war, he was also notable for commanding one of the first Panzer Divisions.

== Biography ==
A Bavarian born in 1881, Feßmann joined the Bavarian Army in 1900 as an Fahnen-junker (officer cadet) and was commissioned as a leutnant (lieutenant) in the cavalry. After service in the German Imperial Army during World War I, he was retained in the postwar Reichswehr (Imperial Defence). After a two-year period on the staff of the 7th Kraftfahr Battalion (motorcycle battalion), he was appointed its commander in 1924. Two years later, he was given command of the 17th Cavalry Regiment.

From 1931 to early 1933, Feßmann led the motorised battalion of the 2nd Artillery Regiment, before a period in the Soviet Union at the Reichswehr's secret Panzertruppenschule (armoured training school) at Kazan. Following Adolf Hitler's disbandment of the school in late 1933, Feßmann was made commander of the Kraftfahrlehrkommando (Motor Vehicle Training Command) at Zossen. He later commanded the Panzer Lehr Brigade.

In March 1935, the Reichswehr was reorganised as the Wehrmacht (Defence Force) and the Heer (Army) branch began a significant expansion which extended to the creation of the Panzerwaffe (Armoured Force). Feßman was appointed commander of the 3rd Panzer Division in Berlin on 15 October 1935, with the rank of generalleutnant (equivalent to the rank of major general in the United States Army). His new command was one of the first three panzer divisions to be created. The other two were the 1st Panzer Division formed in Weimar and commanded by Maximilian von Weichs and the 2nd Panzer Division formed in Würzburg and commanded by Heinz Guderian.

The 3rd Panzer Division was known as the Bear Division, after its divisional symbol and its 1st Panzer Regiment was drawn largely from Feßmann's previous command, the Kraftfahrlehrkommando. Most of its panzer companies, which initially each consisted of only eight tanks, began equipping and training with Panzerkampfwagen I (armored fighting vehicle mark I). Feßmann retired from the Wehrmacht in September 1937 as a general der panzertruppe (General of Panzer Troops) but returned to active service at the outbreak of World War II.

Appointed commander of the newly formed 267th Infantry Division on 26 August 1939, Feßmann served on the Western Front and took part in the invasions of Belgium and France. After the fall of France in May 1940, his division garrisoned a sector along the English Channel for a year, before being transferred east for Operation Barbarossa. Before the invasion of the Soviet Union began, he was replaced as divisional commander by Generalmajor Friedrich-Karl von Wachter (generalmajor is equivalent in rank to a brigadier general in the United States Army). He took up a staff post at Frankfurt and served here until he retired again in 1942. He was officially discharged from the Wehrmacht the following year. Settling in Pullach after the war, he died on 25 October 1962.

== Notes ==
Military offices
Preceded by none	Commander of 3rd Panzer Division; Creation in 1935 – 1 September 1939	Succeeded by Generalleutnant Leo Geyr von Schweppenburg
Preceded by none	Commander of 267th Infantry Division; 1 September 1939 – 1 June 1941	Succeeded by Generalmajor Friedrich-Karl von Wachter
