= Meigem =

Village in Belgium

Coordinates: 51°01′00″N 3°32′26″E

Location of Meigem

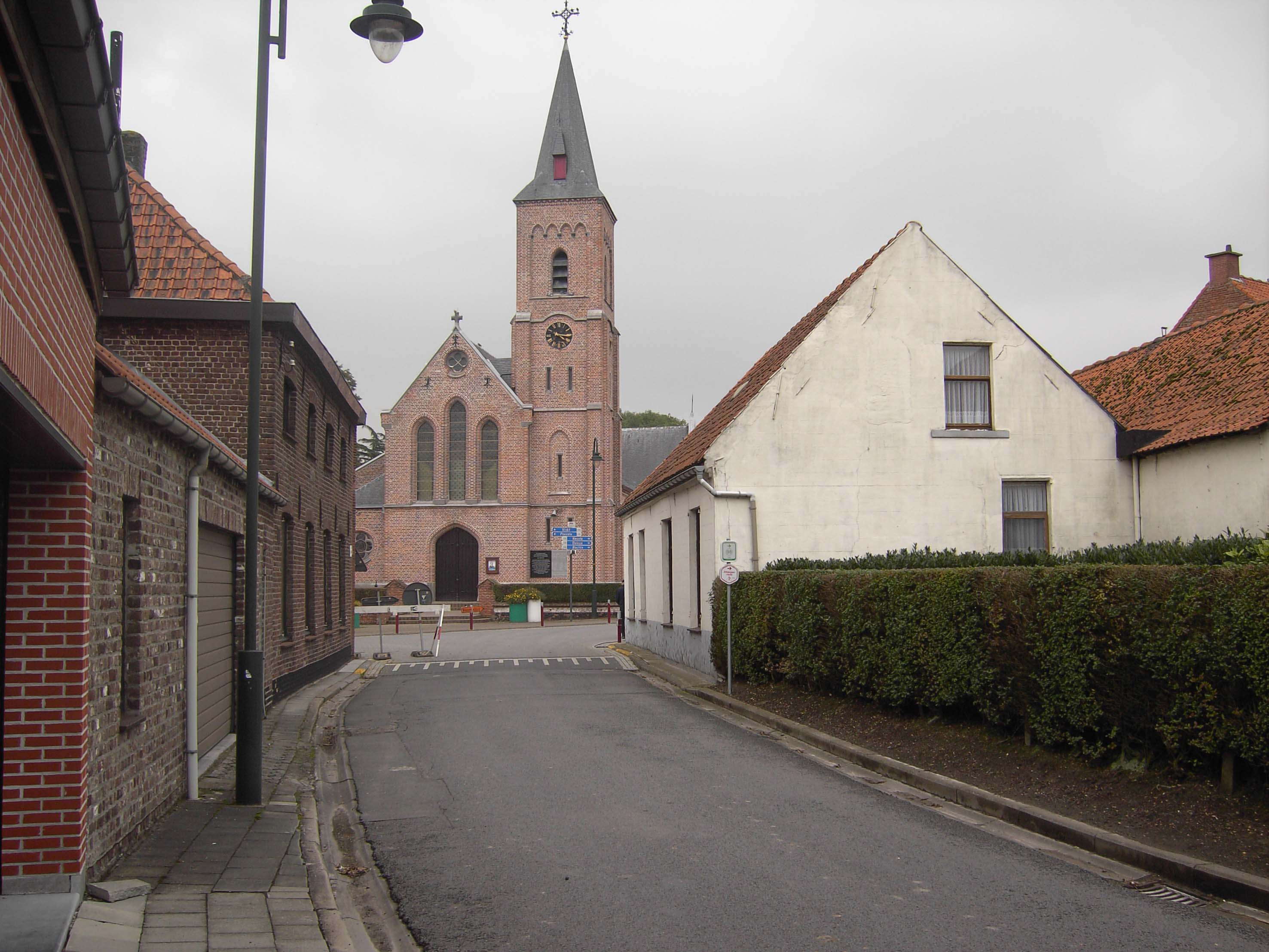
The village centre with the St. Nicholas Church (2007)

Meigem is a village in the Belgian province of East Flanders and is a submunicipality of Deinze. It was an independent municipality until the municipal reorganization of 1977. The village is located on the Schipdonk Canal, just south of the Poekebeek. The village had 662 inhabitants in 1981.

The oldest mention of Grimmine is from 1121. Its name is said to be derived from the old Germanic grimminja. It was part of the lordship of Nevele. In 1724, the first mention was made of a Holy Blood Procession in Meigem. In 1945, this procession was reinstated.

The oldest evidence of the St. Nicholas Church is from 1218, but it could be even older.

During World War II a war crime committed by German soldiers in the villages of Vinkt and Meigem on 26–28 May 1940 during the Battle of the Lys known as the Vinkt massacre.
