= Vinkt massacre =

1940 German war crime in Belgium

Coordinates: 50°59′12″N 3°31′16.7″E

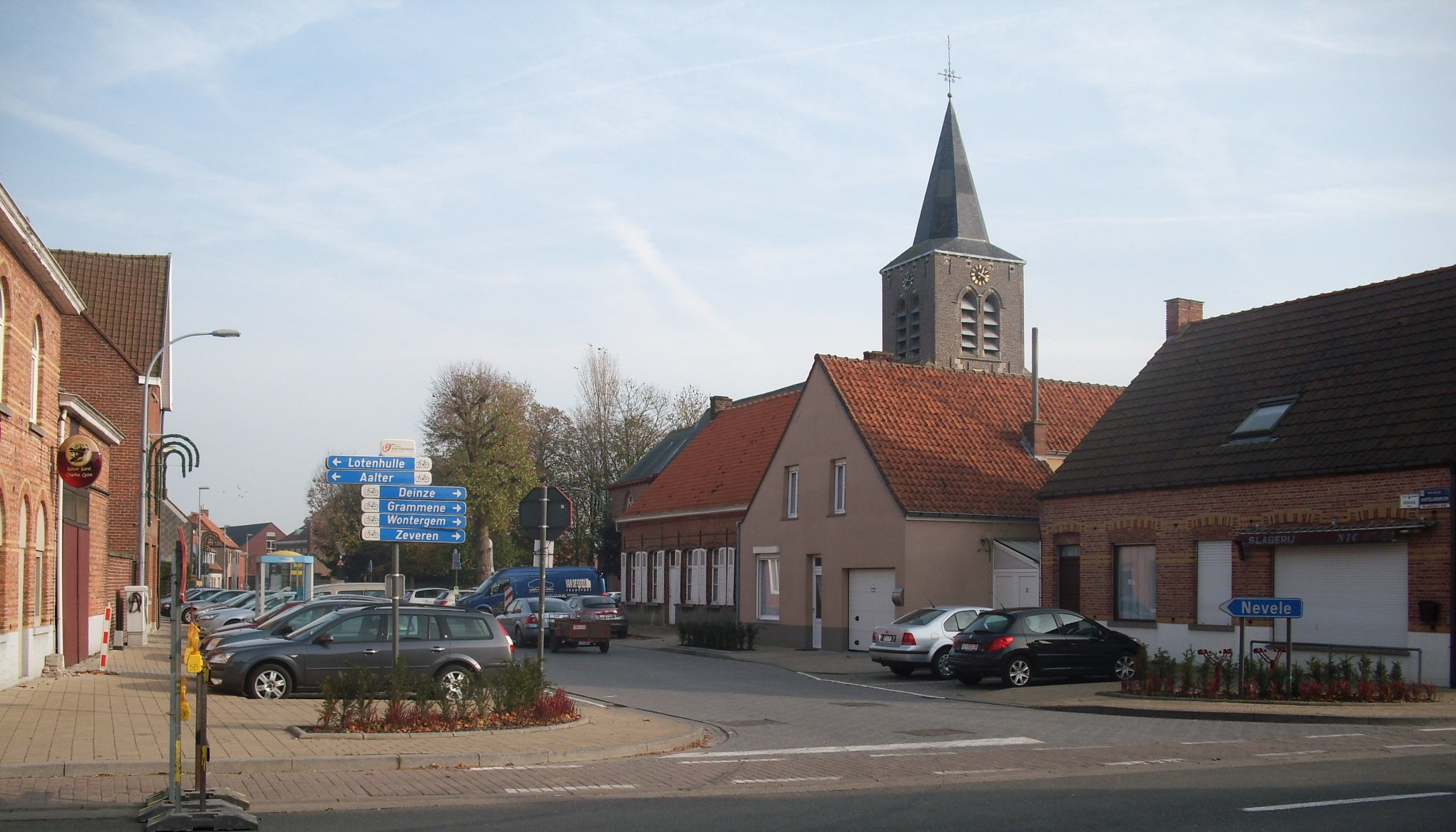
Modern-day view of the village of Vinkt where the massacre occurred

The Vinkt massacre (Dutch: Bloedbad van Vinkt) was a war crime committed by German soldiers in the villages of Vinkt and Meigem in East Flanders on 26–28 May 1940 during the Battle of the Lys. Between 86 and 140 civilians were deliberately killed by Wehrmacht troops from the 377th Infantry Regiment of the 225th Infantry Division, supposedly in retaliation for the Belgian Army's resistance in the village.

== Background ==
As the German Army continued to advance west and pushed back both the British Expeditionary Force (trying to escape to Dunkirk) and the Belgian Army, the village of Vinkt became an important target, as it lay both on the road south from Ghent to Lille and astride the Schipdonk Canal, which blocked the German advance to the west. However, on May 25, both sides already knew the outcome of the Battle of France in which the French Army had collapsed, and the Belgian Army had been reduced to prolonging the war for the sole purpose of protecting the British retreat.

The bridge over the Schipdonk Canal was being guarded by the 1st Belgian Division of Chasseurs Ardennais, which in the Belgian Army of the day meant one regiment of tanks out of five regiments in a division, the rest being motor riders and cyclists. Coincidentally, the division turned out to be one of the most motivated in the Belgian Army. The Belgian command decided not to destroy but to guard the bridge to help as many British stragglers as possible on their way west and as many Belgian refugees as possible on their way south. More than one million Belgians, most of them on foot, as cars and horses had been requisitioned by the different armies, had become refugees. News of what happened at Vinkt would cause an additional one million to flee south or even west. By the middle of June, according to Red Cross figures, 30% of the Belgian population had left the country.

== Massacres ==
=== 25 May ===
Arriving near the bridge on May 25, the German 225th Infantry Division, consisting mostly of badly-trained soldiers from Itzehoe, in the north of the Hamburg area, found it impossible to cross. They took 140 civilians hostage and used them as human shields. As the Chasseurs ardennais continued to harass the German positions, and crossing remained impossible, a grenade exploded among the hostages and killed 27.

=== 26 May ===
On Sunday, the Germans took hostages at the Meigem and the Vinkt churches and at various farms in the neighbourhood. Some hostages were killed on the spot. At the Meigem church, an explosion killed 27 hostages.

=== 27 May ===
Adolf Hitler, on the German radio, demanded Belgium's immediate and unconditional surrender. King Leopold III of Belgium announced to his government that he would use his authority as commander-in-chief to lay down arms.

The Chasseurs ardennais, unaware of the developments, were still holding and defending the bridge against vastly superior odds. For unclear reasons, the 225th Division now started to execute their hostages. Refugees were taken out at random from the columns on the trek south and promptly executed. Only four managed to escape; one, a priest, survived by being buried under two dead colleagues.

=== 28 May ===
Leopold III and the Belgian Army capitulated in the early morning (4 am, 5 am German time).

That did not stop the killings in Vinkt. Nine hostages were shot after the capitulation. The last five victims had been forced to dig their own grave.

== Total number of victims ==
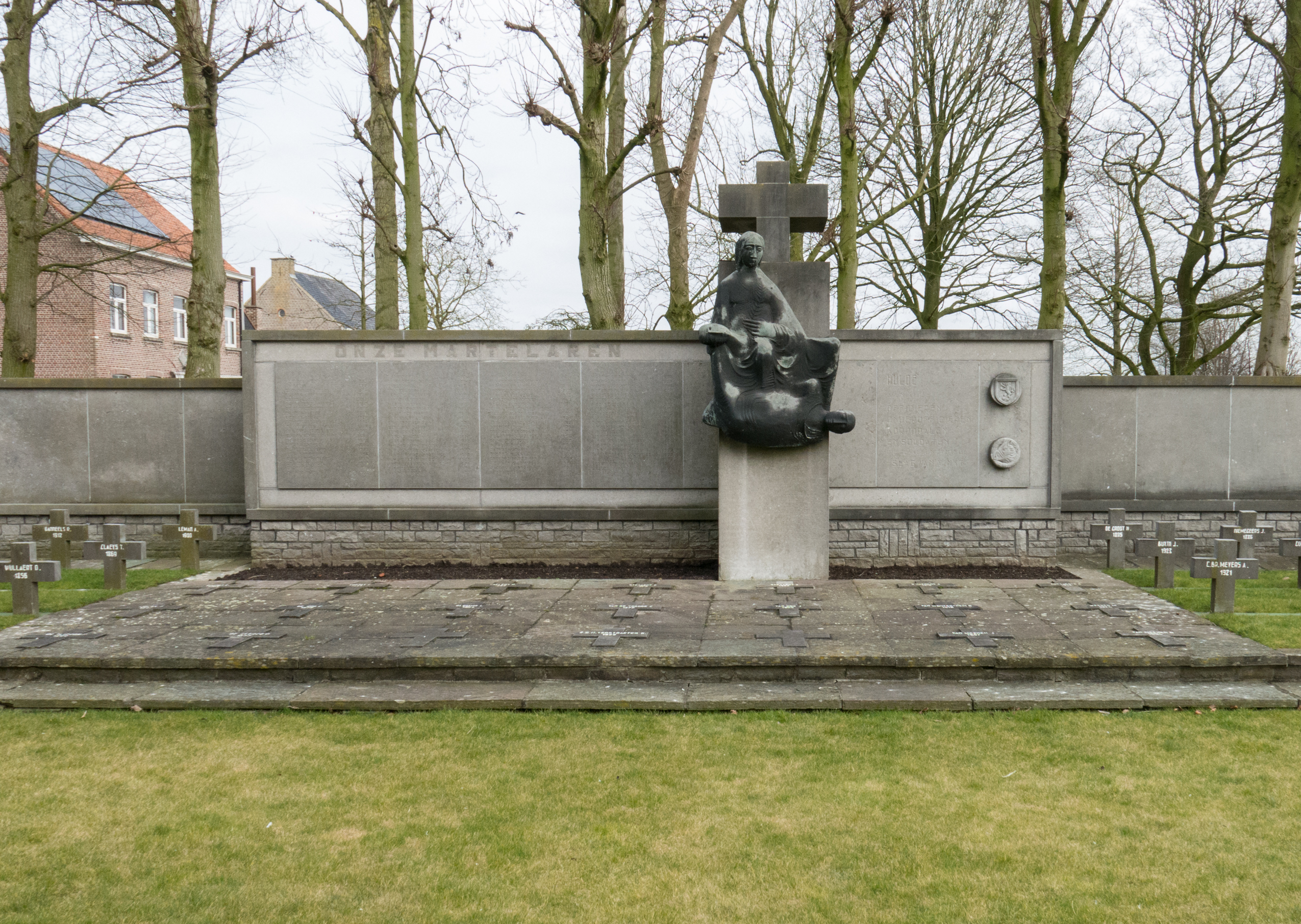
Memorial to the victims of the massacre

Most sources claim between 86 and 140 victims, 86 being the total number of executed victims. The divergence stems from the fact that other historians include the victims in front of the bridge and those 27 killed by the explosion at the church in Meigem. The exploded grenade on May 25 was almost certainly German, but the explosion at the church has usually been attributed to Belgian artillery. However, there remains a controversy over the church explosion, as some victims later claimed to have seen German officers throw hand grenades into the church, and all women hostages had been taken out of the church just before the explosion, which ensured that all 27 victims of the incident were male.

A very different picture was painted by the priest who managed to escape on May 27. He claimed to have seen dead women and children, even babies. Since no corpses of women or children were later found, that would imply, if true, that the scene had been later cleaned up and that the real death toll of the executions is much higher than the 86 or 140 usually claimed. However, most Belgian historians believe that any additional refugee victims seen by the priest were killed in crossfire and not intentionally.

== Aftermath ==
As news of the carnage spread, German press sources denied it or excused it and claimed that Belgian civilians had dressed up as soldiers. Although British newspapers knew the exact story, they refused to press the point since it had happened in Belgium, and they were afraid of being accused of repeating the war propaganda claims that they had made in 1914 with the exaggeration of "The Rape of Belgium".

Although largely ignored outside Belgium, the events did not go entirely unpunished. The German officers were tried after the war.

The lack of conspicuous commemoration of the massacre in Vinkt has been commented upon by various writers, including the Belgian novelist Xavier Hanotte.

== See also ==
- List of massacres in Belgium
- Oignies and Courrières massacre - massacre of French civilians (28 May 1940)
- Le Paradis massacre - massacre of British prisoners of war (27 May 1940)
- Wormhoudt massacre - massacre of British and French prisoners of war (28 May 1940)
