= Vinkt =

Village in Belgium

Coordinates: 51°00′29″N 3°28′43″E

Location of Vinkt

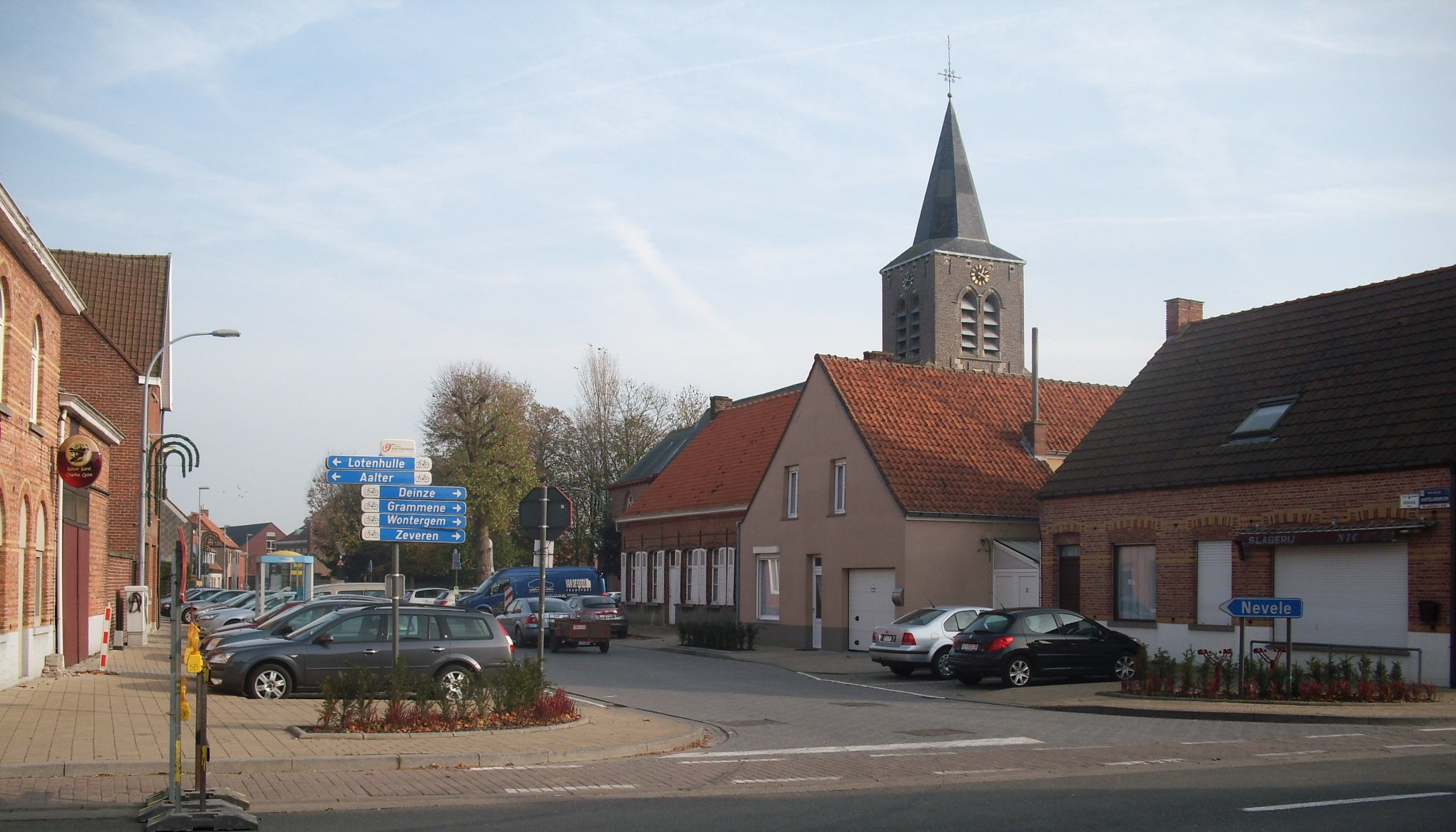
Vinkt (2011)

Vinkt is a village in the Belgian province of East Flanders and is a submunicipality of Deinze. It was an independent municipality until the municipal reorganization of 1977. The village is located on the border with West Flanders, at the intersection of the N409 road from Aalter to Deinze and the road from Aarsele to Nevele. The village had 1304 inhabitants in 1981.

The oldest mention of Vinkt is from 1123 to 1146 as Uincte and as Vinke in 1220. The lordship fell under the Land of Nevele.

During World War II a war crime committed by German soldiers in the villages of Vinkt and Meigem on 26–28 May 1940 during the Battle of the Lys known as the Vinkt massacre.
