= German atrocities committed against Soviet prisoners of war =

WWII Nazi abuse of Soviet POWs

- Part of World War II
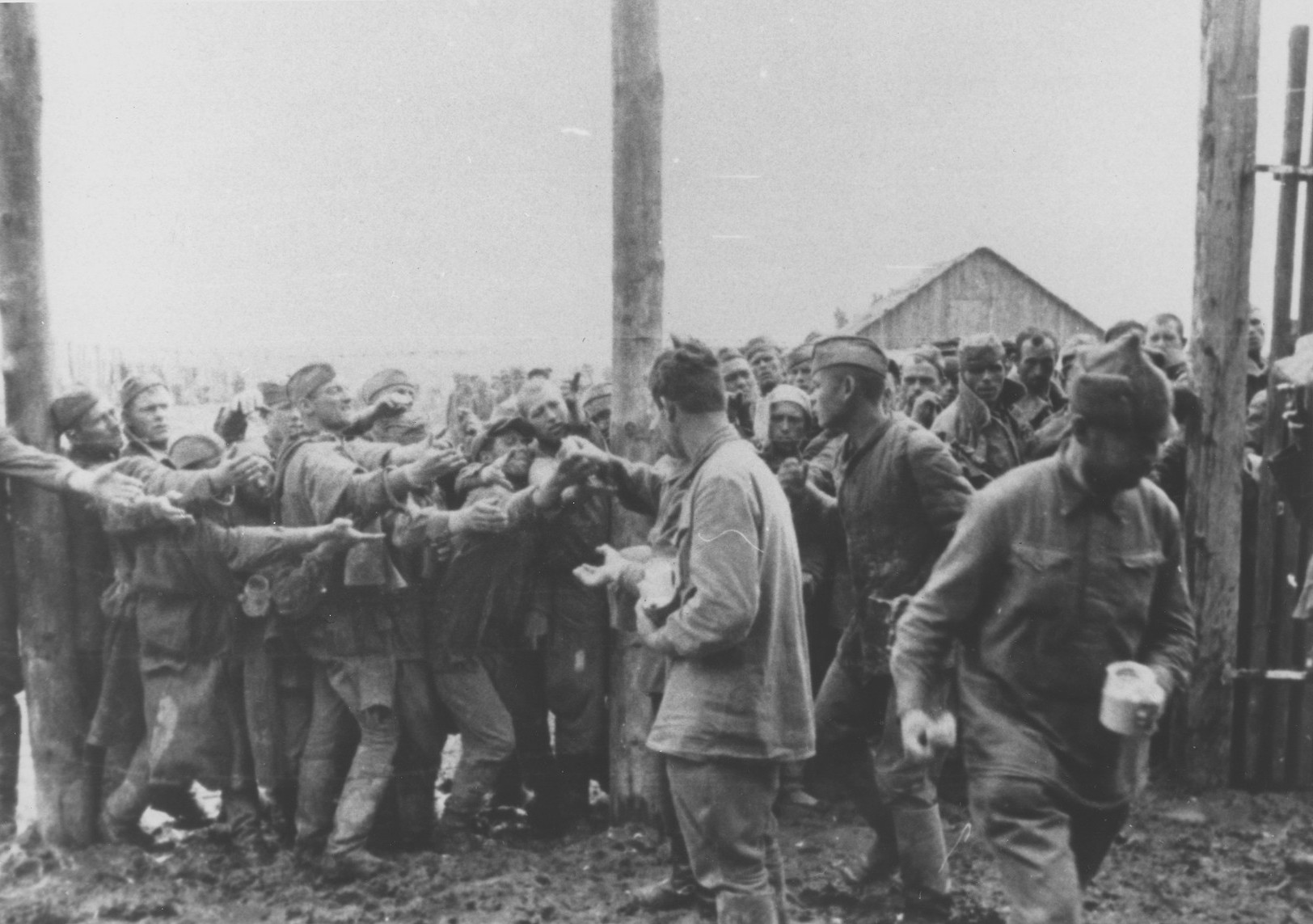
- Distribution of food in a POW camp near Vinnytsia, Ukraine, in July 1941
- Location: Germany and German-occupied Eastern Europe
- Date: 1941–1945
- Target: Captured Soviet troops
- Attack type: Starvation, death marches, summary executions, forced labor
- Deaths: 2.8 to 3.3 million
- Perpetrator: Mostly German Army

During World War II, Soviet prisoners of war (POWs) held by Nazi Germany and primarily in the custody of the German Army were starved and subjected to deadly conditions. Of nearly six million who were captured, around three million died during their imprisonment.

In June 1941, Germany and its allies invaded the Soviet Union and carried out a war of extermination with complete disregard for the laws and customs of war. Among the criminal orders issued before the invasion was for the execution of captured Soviet commissars. Although Germany largely upheld its obligations under the Geneva Convention with prisoners of war of other nationalities, military planners decided to breach it with the Soviet prisoners. By the end of 1941, over 3 million Soviet soldiers had been captured, mostly in large-scale encirclement operations during the German Army's rapid advance. Two-thirds of them had died from starvation, exposure, and disease by early 1942. This is one of the highest sustained death rates for any mass atrocity in history.

Soviet Jews, political commissars, and some officers, communists, intellectuals, Asians, and female combatants were systematically targeted for execution. More prisoners were shot because they were wounded, ill, or unable to keep up with forced marches. Over a million were deported to Germany for forced labor, where many died within sight of the local population. Their conditions were worse than civilian forced laborers or prisoners of war from other countries. More than 100,000 were transferred to Nazi concentration camps, where they were treated worse than other prisoners. An estimated 1.4 million Soviet prisoners of war served as auxiliaries to the German military or SS; collaborators were essential to the German war effort and the Holocaust in Eastern Europe.

Deaths among these Soviet prisoners of war have been called "one of the greatest crimes in military history", second in number only to those of civilian Jews but far less studied. Although the Soviet Union announced the death penalty for surrender early in the war, most former prisoners were reintegrated into Soviet society. Most defectors and collaborators escaped prosecution. Former prisoners of war were not recognized as veterans, and did not receive any reparations until 2015; they often faced discrimination due to the perception that they were traitors or deserters.

== Background ==
Nazi Germany and its allies invaded the Soviet Union on 22 June 1941. The Nazi leadership believed that war with its ideological enemy was inevitable due to the Nazi dogma that conquering territory to the east—called living space (Lebensraum)—was essential to Germany's long-term survival, and the reality that the Soviet Union's natural resources were necessary to continue the German war effort. The vast majority of German military manpower and materiel was devoted to the invasion, which was carried out as a war of extermination with complete disregard for the laws and customs of war. Due to supply shortages and inadequate transport infrastructure, the German invaders planned to feed their army by looting (although in practice they remained dependent on shipments from Germany) and to forestall resistance by terrorizing the local inhabitants with preventative killings.

The Nazis believed that the Jews had caused the German defeat in the First World War, and that the Soviet Union's Slavic population was secretly controlled by an international Jewish conspiracy; by killing communist functionaries and Soviet Jews, they expected that resistance would quickly collapse. The Nazis anticipated that much of the Soviet population (especially in the western areas) would welcome the German invasion, and hoped to exploit tensions between Soviet nationalities in the long run. Soviet citizens were categorized according to a racial hierarchy: Soviet Germans, Balts and Muslims at the top, Ukrainians in the middle, Russians towards the bottom, Asians and Jews lowest. Informed by Nazi racial theory and Germany's experience during World War I, this hierarchy heavily influenced the treatment of prisoners of war.

Another lesson from World War I was the importance of securing food supplies to avoid a repeat of the blockade-induced famine in Germany. Planners considered cordoning off the Soviet Union's "deficit areas" (particularly in the north) that required food imports from its "surplus areas", especially in Ukraine, to redirect this food to Germany or the German army. If the food supply was cut off as planned, an estimated 30 million people—mostly Russians—were expected to die. In reality, the army lacked the resources to cordon off these large areas. More than a million Soviet civilians died from smaller-scale blockades of Soviet urban areas (especially besieged Leningrad and Jewish ghettos) that were less effective than expected because of flight and black market activity. As prisoners of war were held under tighter control than urban or Jewish civilians, they had a higher death rate from starvation.

== Planning and legal basis ==
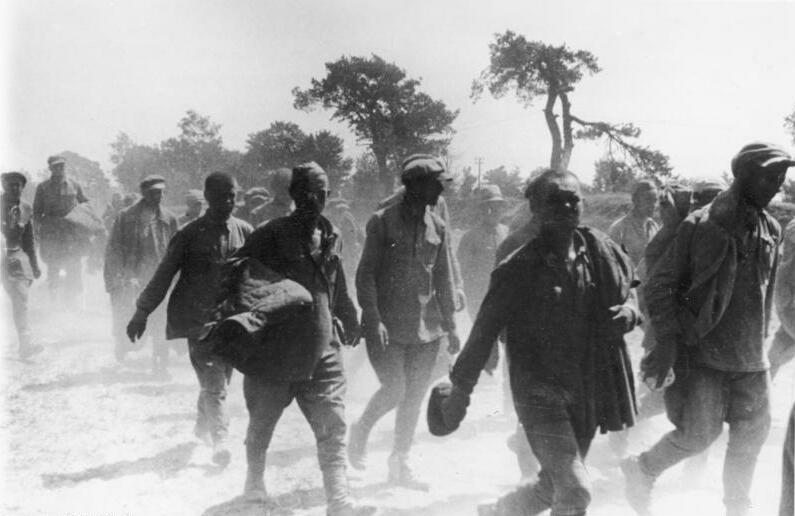
Red Army soldiers captured between Lutsk and Volodymyr-Volynskyi, June 1941

Wehrmacht soldiers with a captured Russian female soldier (derogatorily referred to as a Flintenweib), Russia, 1942.

Before World War II, the treatment of prisoners of war had occupied a central role in the codification of the law of war and detailed guidelines were laid down in the 1907 Hague Convention. Germany was a signatory of the 1929 Geneva Convention on Prisoners of War, and generally adhered to it with non-Soviet prisoners. These laws were covered in Germany's military education, and there was no legal ambiguity that could be exploited to justify its actions. Unlike Germany, the Soviet Union was not a signatory of either convention; its offer to abide by the Hague Convention's provisions regarding prisoners of war if the German army did likewise was rejected by Adolf Hitler several weeks after the start of the war. The OKW said that the Geneva Convention did not apply to Soviet prisoners of war, but suggested that it be the basis of planning. Law and morality played (at best) a minor role in this planning, in contrast to the demand for labor and military expediency. On 30 March 1941, Hitler said privately that "we must distance ourselves from the standpoint of soldierly comradeship" and fight a "war of extermination" because Red Army soldiers were "no comrade" of Germans. No one present raised any objection. Although some in the military opposed the mass deaths of prisoners in 1941 on utilitarian grounds, Abwehr officer Helmuth James Graf von Moltke was one of the few who favored treating Soviet prisoners according to the law.

There is still disagreement between historians as to the role of ideological versus logistical factors in explaining the mass deaths of prisoners in 1941. Anti-Bolshevism, antisemitism, and racism are often cited as the main reasons behind the mass death of prisoners as part of the planned racial restructuring of Germany's empire, but the situation of prisoners of war was also a consequence of the inability to satisfy conflicting demands for security, food, and labor. Although the 3 million Soviet prisoners captured was fewer than expected by the German military, little planning had been done for housing and feeding them. The deaths have been attributed to murderous neglect, or a logistical failure that interrupted German planners' intent to use the prisoners as a labor reserve.

== Capture ==
German advances through 5 December 1941, with large groups of encircled Red Army soldiers in red

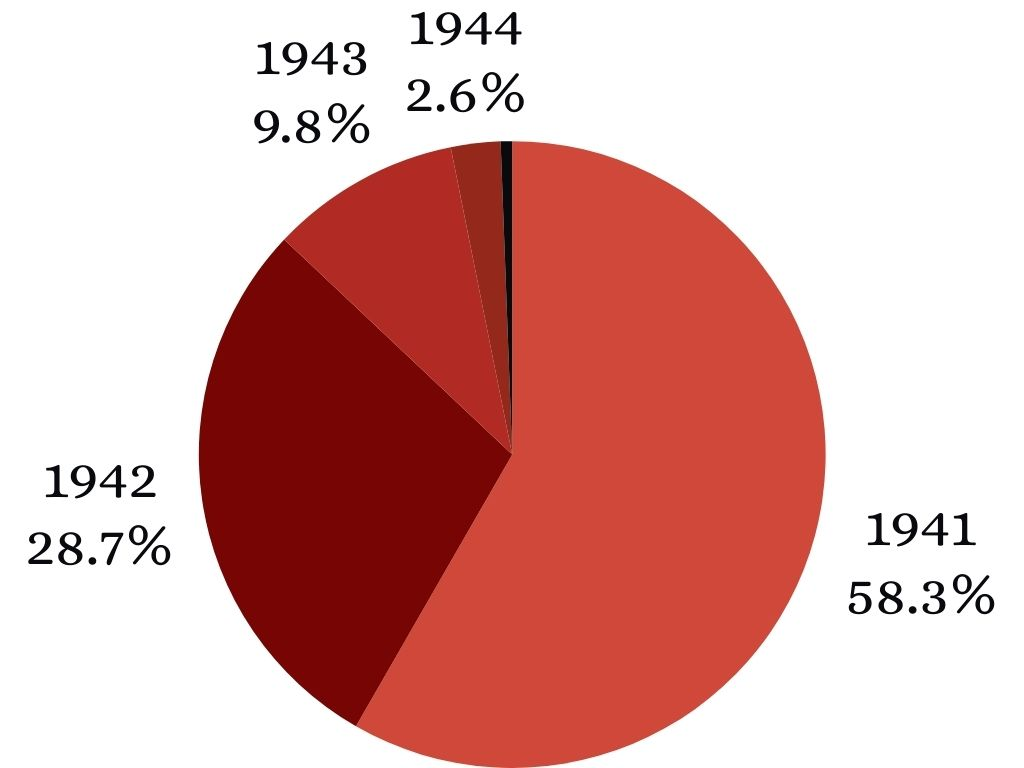
Soviet prisoners of war by year of capture

By mid-December 1941, 79 percent of prisoners captured to date (more than two million) had been apprehended during thirteen major battles where large Soviet forces were surrounded; three or four Soviet soldiers were captured for each one killed. The number of Soviet soldiers captured fell dramatically after the Battle of Moscow in late 1941. The ratio of prisoners to killed also fell, but remained higher than the German side.

Military factors such as poor leadership, lack of arms and ammunition, and being overwhelmed by the German advance were the most important factors causing the mass surrender of Red Army soldiers. The behavior of Soviet soldiers ranged from fighting to the last bullet to making a conscious choice to defect. Opposition to the Soviet government was another important factor in surrenders and defections, which far exceeded the defection rate of other belligerents. Historian Mark Edele estimates that at least hundreds of thousands (possibly more than a million) Soviet soldiers defected during the war.

Soviet soldiers were usually captured in encirclements by Axis front-line troops, who took them to a collection point. From there, the prisoners were sent to transit camps. When many of the transit camps were shut down beginning in 1942, prisoners were sent directly from the collection point to a permanent camp. Sometimes the prisoners were stripped of their winter clothing by their captors for their own use as temperatures dropped late in 1941. Wounded and sick Red Army soldiers usually received no medical care.

=== Summary executions ===
Especially in 1941, German soldiers often refused to take prisoners on the Eastern Front and shot Soviet soldiers who tried to surrender—sometimes in large groups of hundreds or thousands. The German military did not record deaths that occurred prior to prisoners arriving at the collection points. These murders were not ordered by the high command, and some military commanders recognized their harmfulness to German interests. Nevertheless, efforts to discourage such killing had mixed results at best and no German military court verdicts against the perpetrators are known. Although the Red Army shot enemy prisoners less commonly than the German Army did, the execution of prisoners by both armies contributed to a mutual escalation of violence.

To prevent the growth of a partisan movement, Red Army soldiers overtaken by the German advance without being captured were ordered by the Supreme Command of Ground Forces (OKH) to present themselves to the German authorities under the threat of summary execution. Despite the order, few soldiers turned themselves in; some evaded capture and returned to their families. Although most Red Army soldiers who were apprehended were not executed, thousands or tens of thousands were.

Before the beginning of the war, the OKW ordered the execution of captured Soviet commissars and suspicious civilian political functionaries. More than 80 percent of front-line German divisions fighting on the Eastern Front carried out this illegal order, shooting an estimated 4,000 to 10,000 commissars. These killings did not reduce Soviet resistance, and came to be perceived as counterproductive; the order was rescinded in May 1942. Although female combatants in the Soviet army defied German gender expectations, the OKH ordered them to be treated as prisoners of war. Some front-line units executed female combatants and others did not, but ultimately few survived to reach prisoner-of-war camps in Germany.

== Prisoner-of-war camps ==
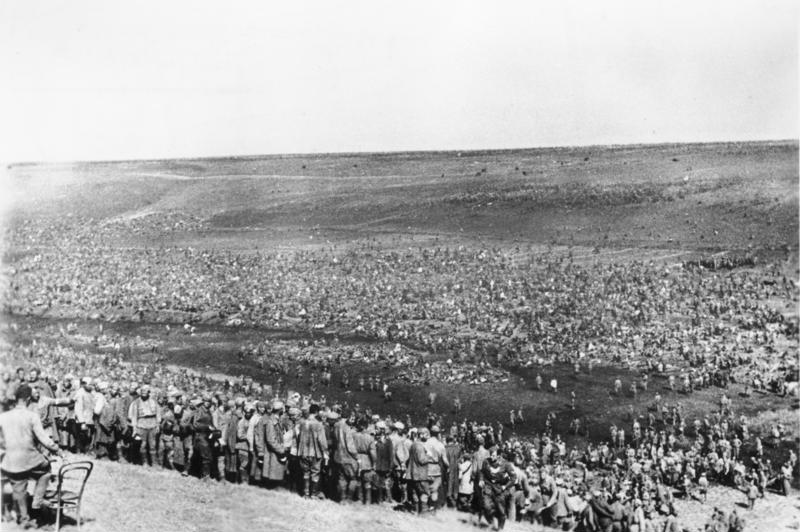
An improvised camp for Soviet prisoners of war, August 1942

By the end of 1941, 81 camps had been established on occupied Soviet territory. Permanent camps were established in areas under civilian administration and areas under military administration that were planned to be turned over to civilian administration. Due to the low priority attached to prisoners of war, each camp commandant had autonomy limited only by the military and economic situation. Although a few tried to ameliorate their conditions, most did not. At the end of 1944, all prisoner-of-war camps were placed under SS chief Heinrich Himmler's authority. Although military authorities from the OKW down also distributed orders to refrain from excessive violence against prisoners of war, historian David Harrisville says that these orders had little effect in practice and their main effect was to bolster a positive self-image in German soldiers.

=== Death marches ===
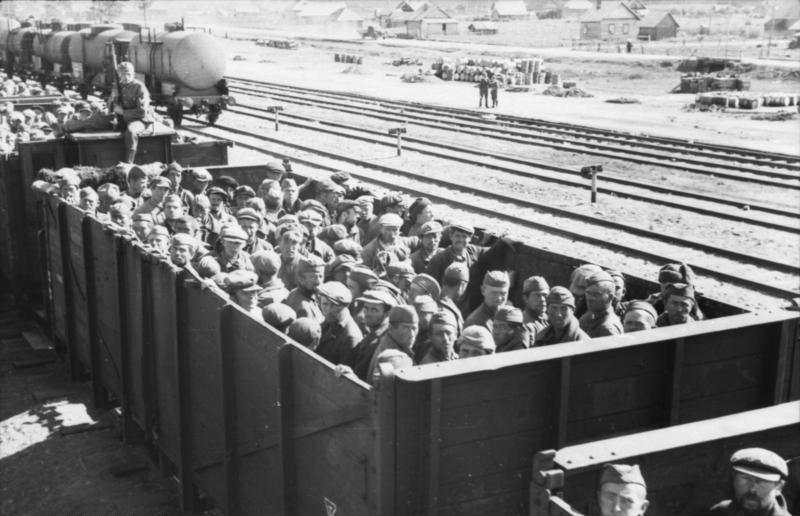
Soviet POWs transported on an open-wagon train, September 1941

Prisoners were often forced to march hundreds of kilometers on foot with little to no food or water. Guards frequently shot anyone who fell behind, and the quantity of corpses left behind created a health hazard. Sometimes Soviet prisoners were able to escape due to inadequate supervision. The use of railcars for transport was often forbidden to prevent the spread of disease, though open cattle wagons were used after October 1941, which resulted in the death of some 20 percent of passengers due to cold weather. A figure of 200,000 to 250,000 deaths in transit is provided in Russian estimates.

=== Housing conditions ===
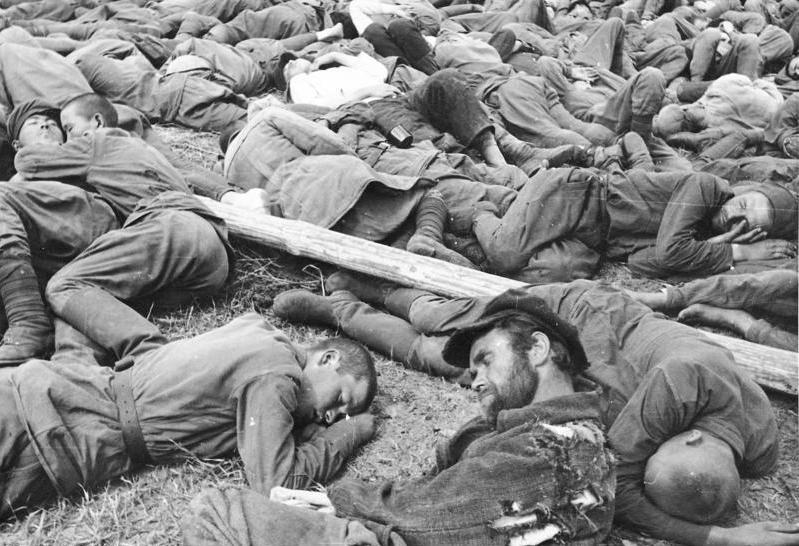
Soviet prisoners of war captured near Białystok, June or July 1941

Poor housing and cold conditions were major factors in the mass deaths. Prisoners were herded into open, fenced-off areas with no buildings or latrines; some camps did not have running water. Kitchen facilities were rudimentary, and many prisoners got nothing to eat. Some prisoners had to live in the open for the entire winter, or in unheated rooms, or in burrows they dug themselves which often collapsed. In September 1941, the Germans started preparations for winter housing; the building of barracks was rolled out systematically in November. These preparations were inadequate. The situation improved because the mass deaths made the camps less overcrowded. The death toll at many prisoner-of-war camps was comparable to the largest Nazi concentration camps. One of the largest camps was Dulag 131 in Bobruisk, where an estimated 30,000 to 40,000 Red Army soldiers died.

There were relatively few guards and the liberal use of firearms was encouraged by military superiors such as Hermann Reinecke. Both of these factors contributed to brutality. The Germans recruited prisoners—mainly Ukrainians, Cossacks, and Caucasians—as camp police and guards. Regulations specified that the camps be surrounded by watchtowers and double barbed-wire fences 2.5 meters (8 ft 2 in) high. Despite draconian penalties, organized resistance groups formed at some camps and attempted mass escapes. Tens of thousands of Soviet prisoners of war attempted to escape; about half were recaptured, and around 10,000 reached Switzerland. If they did not commit crimes after their escape, recaptured prisoners were usually returned to the prisoner-of-war camps; otherwise, they were turned over to the Gestapo and imprisoned (or executed) in a nearby concentration camp.

=== Hunger and mass deaths ===
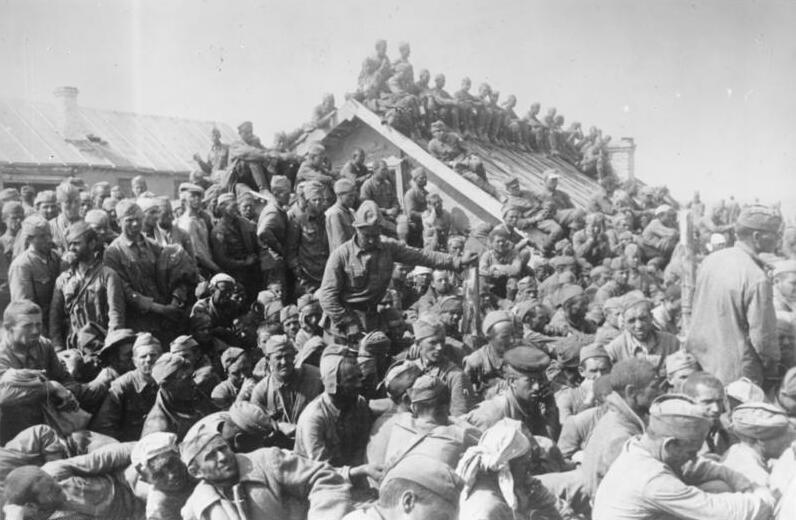
At the camps in Smolensk, the headquarters of Army Group Center (pictured in August 1941), 300 to 600 prisoners died each day in late 1941 and early 1942.

Food for prisoners was extracted from the occupied Soviet Union after the occupiers' needs were met. Prisoners usually received less than the official ration due to supply problems. By mid-August 1941, it had become clear that many prisoners would die. The capture of nearly a million and a half million prisoners during the encirclements of Kiev, Vyazma, and Bryansk in September and October caused a sudden breakdown in makeshift logistical arrangements. On 21 October 1941, OKH general quartermaster Eduard Wagner issued an order reducing daily rations for non-working prisoners to 1,487 calories—a starvation amount that was rarely delivered. Working prisoners were also often put on starvation diets due to a lack of supplies. Non-working prisoners—all but one million of the 2.3 million held at the time—would die, as Wagner acknowledged at a November 1941 meeting.

Following setbacks in the military campaign, Hitler ordered on 31 October that labor deployment in Germany for surviving prisoners be prioritized. After this order was issued, death rates reached their apex; the need for prisoner labor could not overcome the other priorities for food distribution. The number of prisoners working declined as those deemed unfit for work or quarantined due to epidemics continued to increase. Although prisoners had not received much food from the beginning, death rates skyrocketed during Autumn due to increased numbers, the cumulative effects of starvation, epidemics, and falling temperatures. Hundreds died daily at each camp, too many to bury. German policy shifted to prioritize feeding prisoners at the expense of the Soviet civilian population but, in practice, conditions did not significantly improve until June 1942 due to improved logistics and fewer prisoners to feed. Mass deaths were repeated on a smaller scale in the winter of 1942–1943.

Starving prisoners attempted to eat leaves, grass, bark, and worms. Some Soviet prisoners suffered so much from hunger that they made written requests to their guards to be shot. Cannibalism was reported in several camps, despite capital punishment for this offense. Soviet civilians who tried to provide food were often shot. In many camps, those who were in better condition were separated from prisoners deemed to have no chance of survival. Employment could be beneficial in securing additional food and better conditions, although workers often received insufficient food and death rates exceeded 50 percent on some labor deployments.

=== Release ===
On 7 August 1941, the OKW issued an order to release prisoners who were ethnically German, Latvian, Lithuanian, Estonian, Caucasian, and Ukrainian. The purpose of the release was largely to ensure that the harvest in German-occupied areas was successful. Red Army women were excluded from this policy. Ethnic Russians, the vast majority of prisoners, were not considered for release, and about half of the Ukrainians were freed. Releases were curtailed due to epidemics and fear that they would join the partisans. Some severely injured prisoners with family living nearby were released; many probably died of starvation soon afterwards. By January 1942, 280,108 prisoners of war—mostly Ukrainians—had been released, and the total number released was around a million by the end of the war. In addition to agriculture, prisoners were released so that they could join military or police collaboration. About one-third entered the German Army, and others changed their status from prisoner to guard. As the war progressed, release for agricultural work decreased and military recruitment increased.

=== Selective killings ===
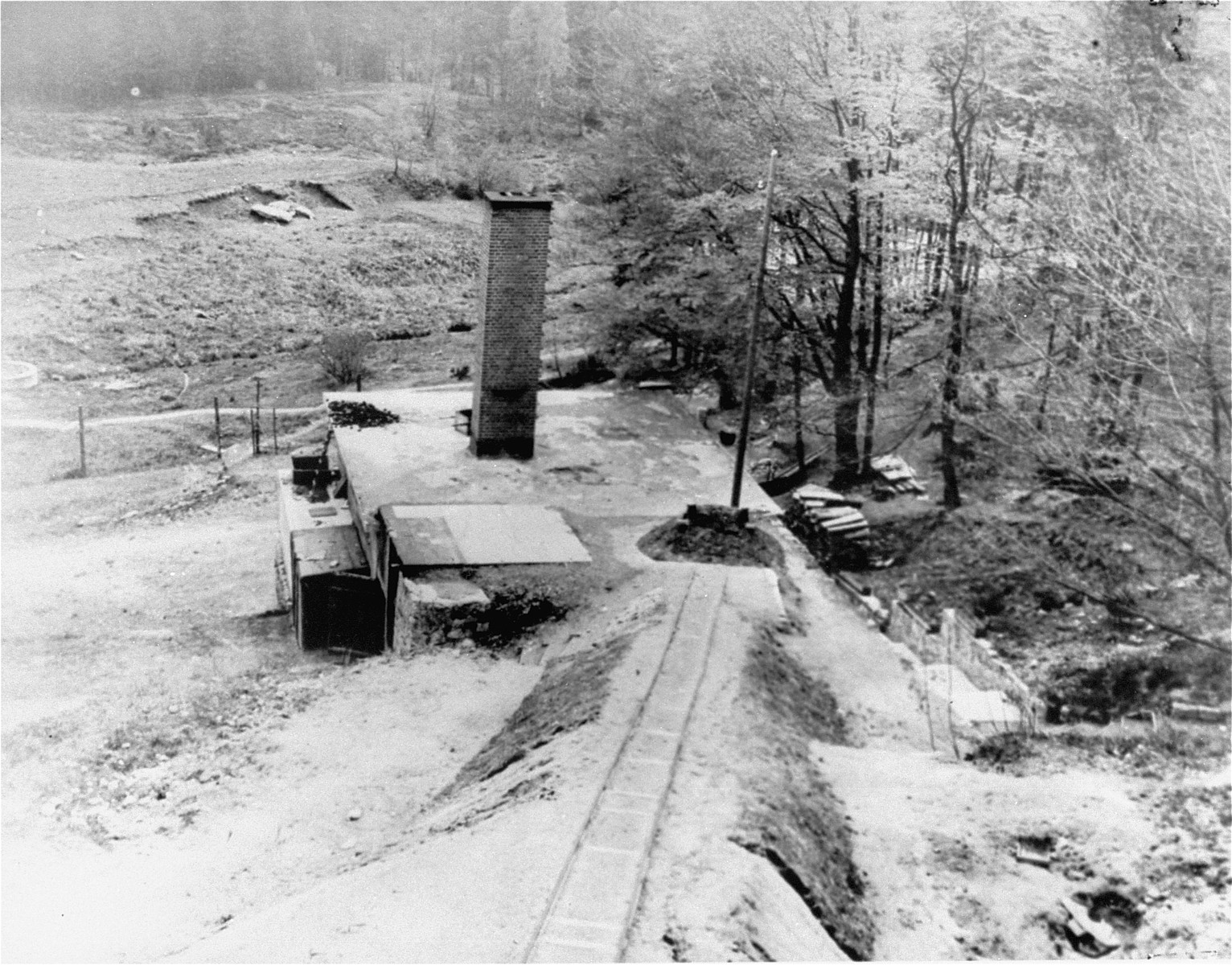
Soviet prisoners of war were shot at the Flossenbürg concentration camp crematorium with silencers after local residents complained about gunfire.

The selective killing of prisoners held by the army was enabled by its close cooperation with the SS and Soviet informers, and soldiers often conducted the executions. The killings targeted commissars and Jews, and sometimes communists, intellectuals, Red Army officers, and (in 1941) Asian-appearing prisoners; about 80 percent of Turkic prisoners were killed by early 1942. German counterintelligence identified many individuals as Jews with medical examinations, denunciation by fellow prisoners, or a stereotypically Jewish appearance.

Beginning in August 1941, additional screening by the Security Police and the SS Security Service in the occupied Soviet Union led to the killing of another 38,000 prisoners. With the army's cooperation, Einsatzgruppen units visited the prisoner-of-war camps to carry out mass executions. About 50,000 Jewish Red Army soldiers were killed, but 5 to 25 percent escaped detection. Soviet Muslims mistaken for Jews were sometimes killed. From 1942, systematic killing increasingly targeted wounded and sick prisoners. Those unable to work were often shot in mass executions or left to die, disabled soldiers were in particular danger when the front approached. Sometimes mass executions were conducted without a clear rationale.

For the prisoner-of-war camps in Germany, screening was carried out by the Gestapo. Those highlighted for scrutiny were interrogated for about 20 minutes, often with torture. If their responses were unsatisfactory, they were stripped of prisoner-of-war status and brought to a concentration camp for execution, to conceal their fate from the German public. At least 33,000 prisoners were transferred to Nazi concentration camps—Auschwitz, Buchenwald, Dachau, Flossenbürg, Gross-Rosen, Mauthausen, Gusen, Neuengamme, Sachsenhausen, and Hinzert. These killings dwarfed previous killings in the camp system. As the war progressed, increasing manpower shortages motivated the curtailment of executions. After March 1944, all Soviet officers and non-commissioned officers implicated in escape attempts were executed. These resulted in 5000 executions, including 500 officers who took part in an attempted mass escape from Mauthausen. The death toll from direct executions, including the shooting of wounded soldiers, was probably hundreds of thousands.

== Auxiliaries in German service ==
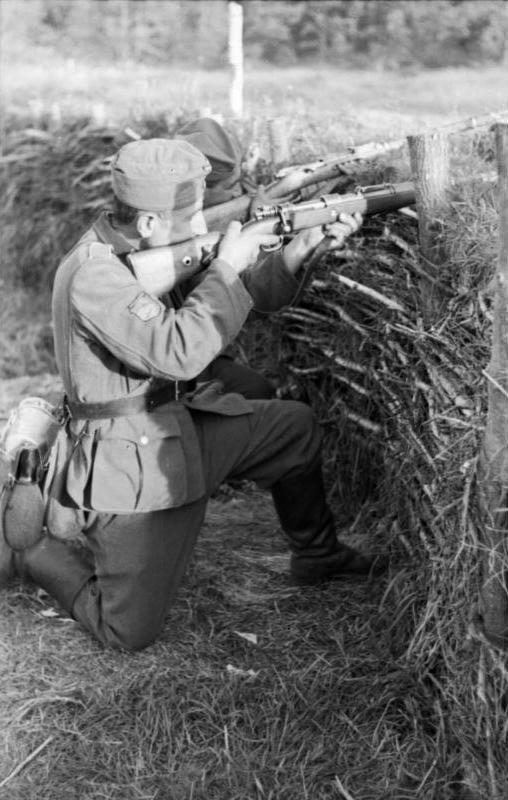
An Armenian Legion soldier in 1943

Hitler opposed recruiting Soviet collaborators for military and police functions, blaming non-German recruits for defeat in World War I. Nevertheless, military leaders in the east disregarded his instructions and recruited such collaborators from the outset of the war; Himmler recognized in July 1941 that locally-recruited police would be necessary. The motivations of those who joined are not well known, although it is assumed that many joined to survive or improve their living conditions and others had ideological motives. A large proportion of those who survived being taken prisoner in 1941 did so because they collaborated with the Germans. Most had supporting roles such as drivers, cooks, grooms, translators, or in mine clearance; others were directly engaged in fighting, particularly during anti-partisan warfare.

A minority of captured prisoners of war were reserved by each field army for forced labor in its operational area; these prisoners were not registered. Their treatment varied, with some having living conditions similar to German soldiers and others being treated as badly as they were in the camps. Prisoners working in the rear areas played a vital role in converting Soviet railways to the German gauge, which provided essential logistical support to the German army. A smaller number joined dedicated military units with German officers, staffed by Soviet ethnic minorities. The first anti-partisan unit formed from Soviet prisoners of war was a Cossack unit which operated from July 1941. In 1943, there were 53 battalions raised from prisoners of war and other Soviet citizens: fourteen in the Turkestan Legion, nine in the Armenian Legion, eight each in the Azerbaijani and Georgian Legions, and seven in the North Caucasian and Idel-Ural Legions.

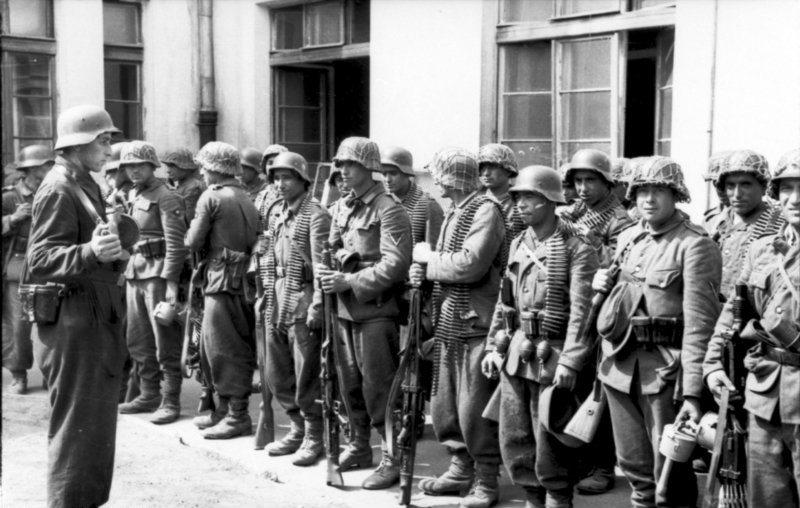
Members of the Azerbaijani Field Battalion 111, who were involved in the Wola massacre and other war crimes during the August 1944 Warsaw Uprising

Along with those recruited by the German military, others were recruited by the SS to engage in genocide. The Trawniki men were recruited from prisoner-of-war camps; largely ethnic Ukrainians and Germans, they included Poles, Georgians, Armenians, Azerbaijanis, Tatars, Latvians, and Lithuanians. They helped suppress the 1943 Warsaw Ghetto Uprising, worked in the extermination camps that killed millions of Jews in German-occupied Poland, and carried out anti-partisan operations. Collaborators were essential to the German war effort and the Holocaust.

If recaptured by the Red Army, collaborators were often shot. After the German defeat at Stalingrad in early 1943, defections of collaborators back to the Soviet side increased; in response, Hitler ordered all Soviet military collaborators transferred to the Western Front late that year. By D-Day in mid-1944, these soldiers were 10 percent of the "German" forces occupying France. Some aided the resistance; in 1945, parts of the Georgian Legion rebelled. Soviet prisoners of war were forced to work in construction and pioneer forces for the army, air force, and navy. Prisoners of war were admitted into anti-aircraft units after April 1943, where they could be as much as 30 percent of their strength. By the end of the war, 1.4 million prisoners of war (out of a total of 2.4 million) were serving in some kind of auxiliary military unit.

== Forced labor ==
Forced labor engaged in by Soviet prisoners of war often violated the 1929 Geneva Convention. For example, the convention forbids work in war industries.

=== In the Soviet Union ===
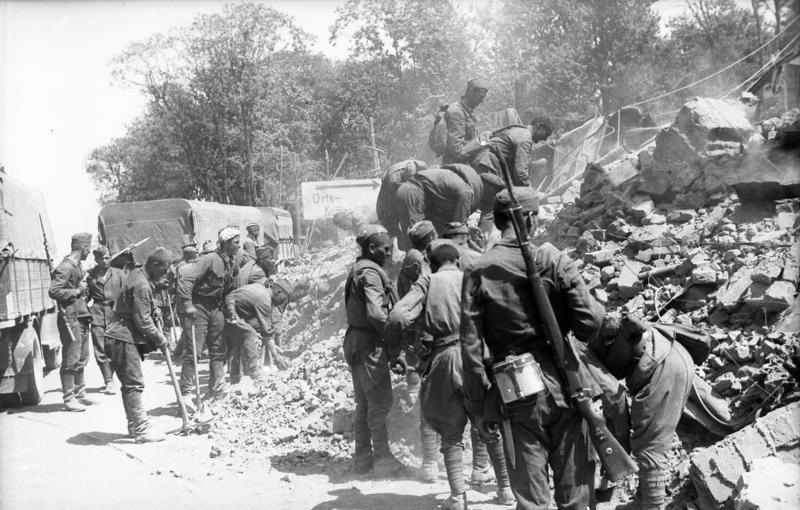
Soviet POWs at work in Minsk, Belarus, July 1941

Without the labor of Soviet prisoners of war for military infrastructure in the German rear areas—building roads, bridges, airfields and train depots and converting the Soviet wider-gauge railway to the German standard—the German offensive would soon have failed. In September 1941, Hermann Göring ordered the use of prisoners of war for mine clearing and construction of infrastructure to free up construction battalions. Many prisoners ran away because of poor conditions in the camps (limiting forced-labor assignments), Others died: particularly deadly assignments included road-building projects (especially in eastern Galicia), fortification-building on the Eastern Front, and mining in the Donets basin (authorized by Hitler in July 1942). About 48,000 were assigned to this task, but most never began their labor assignments and the remainder perished from the conditions or had escaped by March 1943.

=== Transfer to Nazi concentration camps ===
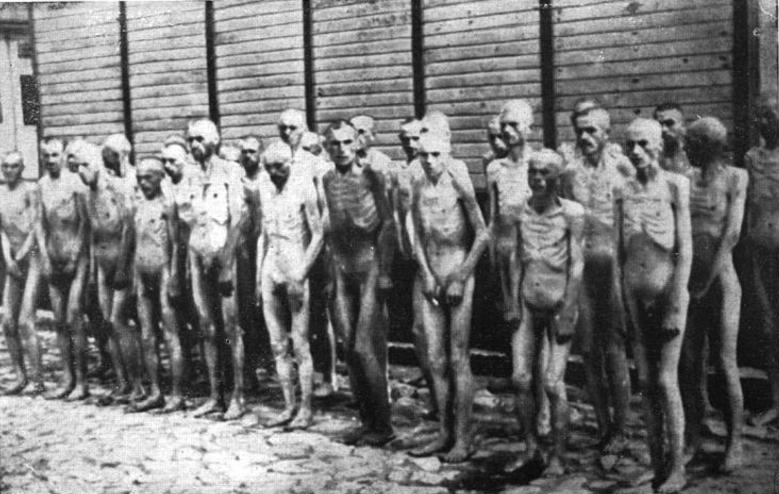
Naked Soviet prisoners of war in Mauthausen concentration camp, to which at least 15,000 were deported

In September 1941, Himmler began advocating for the transfer of 100,000, then 200,000 Soviet prisoners of war for forced labor in Nazi concentration camps under the control of the SS; the camps previously held 80,000 people. By October, segregated areas designated for prisoners of war had been established at Neuengamme, Buchenwald, Flossenbürg, Gross-Rosen, Sachsenhausen, Dachau, and Mauthausen by clearing prisoners from existing barracks or building new ones. Most of the incoming prisoners were planned to be imprisoned in two new camps established in German-occupied Poland, Majdanek and Auschwitz II-Birkenau, as part of Himmler's colonization plans.

Despite the intention to exploit their labor, most of the 25,000 or 30,000 who arrived in late 1941 were in poor condition and incapable of work. Kept in worse conditions and provided less food than other prisoners, they had a higher mortality rate; 80 percent were dead by February 1942. The SS killed politically-suspect, sick, and weak prisoners individually, and carried out mass executions in response to infectious-disease outbreaks. Experimental execution techniques were tested on prisoners of war: gas vans at Sachsenhausen and Zyklon B in gas chambers at Auschwitz. So many died at Auschwitz that its crematoria were overloaded; the SS began tattooing prisoner numbers in November 1941 to keep track of which prisoners had died. Contrary to Himmler's assumption, more Soviet prisoners of war did not replace those who died. As the capture of Red Army soldiers dropped off, Hitler decided at the end of October 1941 to deploy the remaining prisoners in the German war economy.

In addition to those sent for labor in late 1941, others were recaptured after escapes or arrested for offenses such as relationships with German women, insubordination, refusal to work, and suspected resistance activities or sabotage or were expelled from collaborationist military units. Red Army women were often pressured to renounce their prisoner-of-war status to be transferred to civilian forced-labor programs. Some refused, and were sent to concentration camps. About 1,000 were imprisoned at Ravensbrück, and others at Auschwitz, Majdanek, and Mauthausen. Those imprisoned in concentration camps for an infraction lost their prisoner-of-war status, in violation of the Geneva Convention. Officers were over-represented among the more than 100,000 men and an unknown number of women who were transferred to Nazi concentration camps.

=== Deportation elsewhere ===
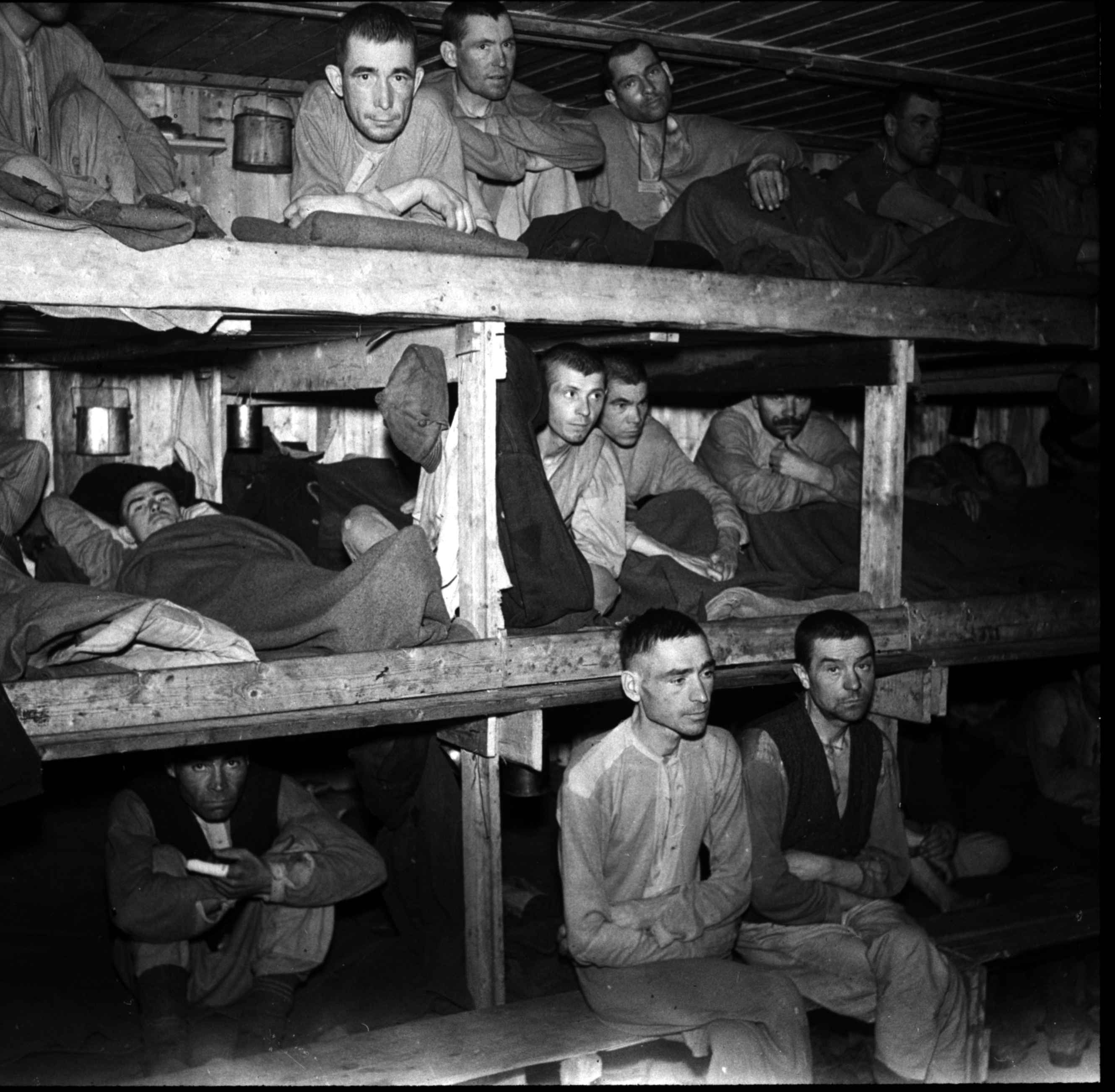
Soviet prisoner-of-war barracks in Saltdal Municipality, Norway, after liberation

In July and August 1941, 200,000 Soviet prisoners of war were deported to Germany to fill the labor demands of agriculture and industry. The deportees faced conditions similar to those in the occupied Soviet Union. Hitler halted the transports in mid-August, but changed his mind on 31 October; along with the prisoners of war, a larger number of Soviet civilians were sent. The camps in Germany had an internal police force of non-Russian prisoners who were often violent towards Russians; Soviet Germans often staffed the camp administration, and were interpreters. Both groups received more rations and preferential treatment. Guarding the prisoners was the responsibility of the army's units of German men too elderly or infirm to serve at the front.

Many Nazi leaders wanted to avoid contact between Germans and prisoners of war, limiting work assignments for prisoners. Labor assignments differed in accordance with the local economy. Many worked for private employers in agriculture and industry, and others were rented to local authorities for such tasks as building roads and canals, quarrying, and cutting peat. Employers paid RM0.54 (Note: Approximately 13 cents in contemporary United States dollars, or USD3 today.) per day per man for agricultural work, and RM0.80 (Note: Approximately 20 cents in contemporary United States dollars, or USD4 today.) for other work; many also provided prisoners with extra food to achieve productivity. Workers received RM0.20 (Note: Approximately 5 cents in contemporary United States dollars, or USD1 today.) per day in currency that could be spent at the camp. By early 1942, to combat the fact that many prisoners were too malnourished to work, some surviving prisoners were granted increased rations although significant improvement was politically impossible because supply shortages necessitated a reduction in rations to German citizens. Prisoners remained vulnerable to malnutrition and disease. The number of prisoners working in Germany continued to increase, from 455,000 in September 1942 to 652,000 in May 1944. By the end of the war, at least 1.3 million Soviet prisoners of war had been deported to Germany or its annexed territories. Of these, 400,000 did not survive; most of the deaths occurred in the winter of 1941–1942. Others were deported to other locations, including Norway and the Channel Islands.

== Public perception ==
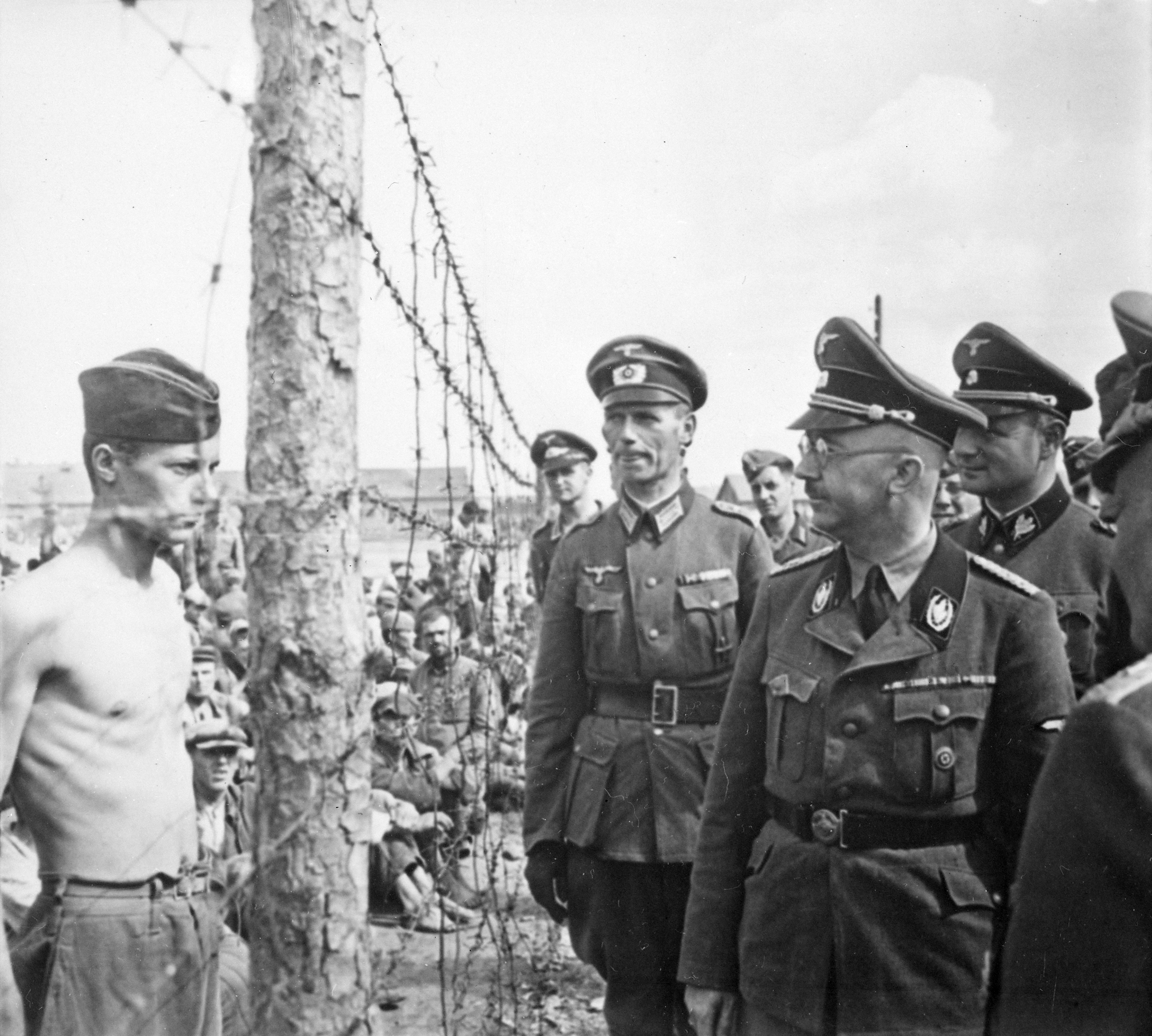
SS head Heinrich Himmler inspects a prison camp in Minsk, 15 August 1941

According to Security Service reports, many Germans worried about food shortages and wanted Soviet prisoners to be killed or given minimal food for this reason. Nazi propaganda portrayed Soviet prisoners of war as murderers, and photographs of cannibalism in prisoner-of-war camps were seen as proof of "Russian subhumanity". Although many Germans claimed ignorance of the Holocaust after the war, many Germans were aware of the large number of Soviet prisoners of war who died before most German Jews had been deported.

Soviet propaganda began integrating the atrocities against Soviet prisoners of war as early as July 1941. Information about the Commissar Order, described as mandating the killing of all officers or prisoners captured, was disseminated to Red Army soldiers. Accurate information about the treatment of Soviet prisoners of war reached Red Army soldiers by various means—such as escapees and other eyewitnesses—and was an effective deterrent against defection although many disbelieved the official propaganda.

== End of the war ==
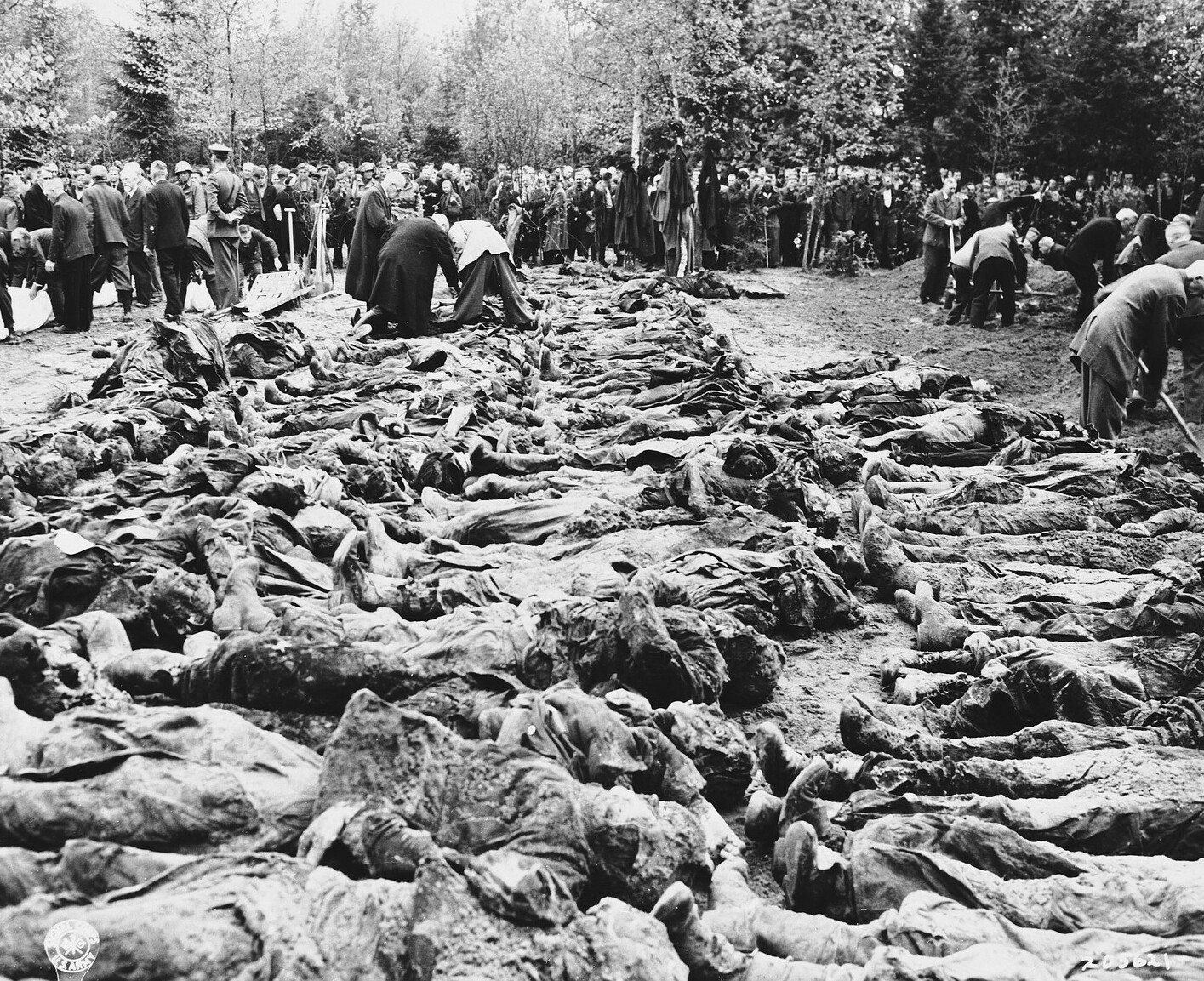
On 8 April 1945, more than 200 Soviet prisoners of war were forced to dig their own graves and murdered in Hanover-Wülfel.

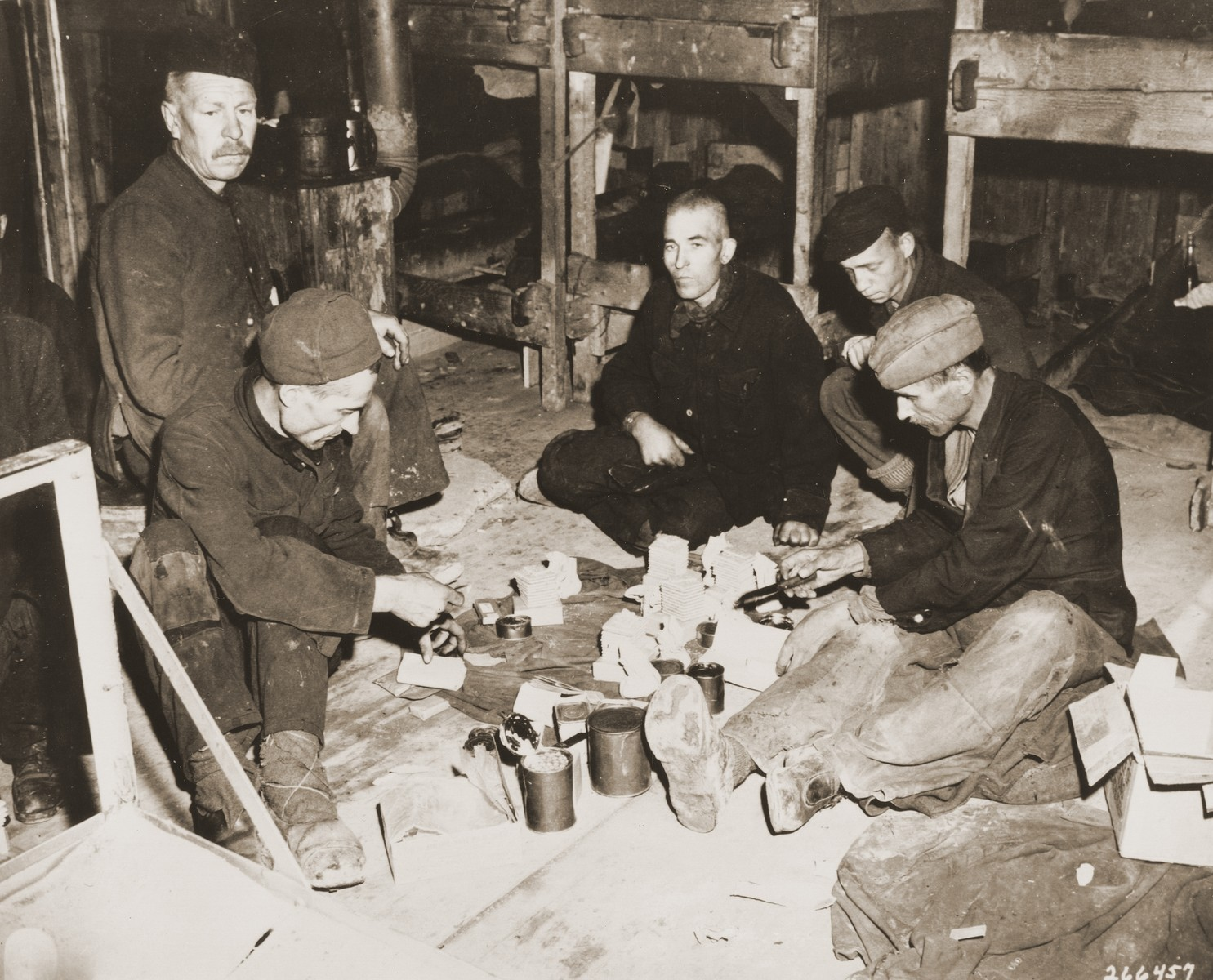
Liberated Soviet prisoners at the Hemer labor camp

About 500,000 prisoners had been freed by the Red Army by February 1945. During its advance, the Red Army found mass graves at former prisoner-of-war camps. In the war's final months, most of the remaining Soviet prisoners were forced on death marches similar to those of concentration-camp prisoners. Many were killed during these marches or died from illness after liberation. Due to its clear-cut criminality, the treatment of Soviet prisoners of war was mentioned in the International Military Tribunal's indictment.

At the Yalta Conference, the Western Allies agreed to repatriate Soviet citizens regardless of their wishes. Approximately 1.7 million soldiers survived, including those who entered German military or police service. The Allies initiated a massive program of repatriation of Soviet citizens that ran through the early 1950s. However, the bulk of the transfers occurred in May and summer of 1945. Former POWs returned to a country which had lost millions of people to the war and had its infrastructure destroyed by German Army scorched-earth tactics. For years afterwards the Soviet population experienced food shortages. Former prisoners of war were among the 451,000 or more Soviet citizens who avoided repatriation and remained in Germany or emigrated to Western countries after the war.

Soviet policy, intended to discourage defection, held that any soldier who fell into enemy hands was a traitor. Issued in August 1941, Order No. 270 classified surrendering commanders and political officers deserters to be summarily executed and their families arrested. Sometimes Red Army soldiers were told that the families of defectors would be shot; although thousands were arrested, it is unknown if any such executions were carried out. As the war continued, Soviet leaders realized that most of their citizens had not voluntarily collaborated. In November 1944, the State Defense Committee decided that freed prisoners of war would be returned to the army; those who served in German military units or the police would be handed over to the NKVD.

In an attempt to separate the minority of voluntary collaborators, freed prisoners of war were sent to filtration camps, hospitals, and recuperation centers, where most stayed for one or two months. This process was not effective in separating the minority of voluntary collaborators, and most defectors and collaborators escaped prosecution. Trawniki men were typically sentenced to 10 to 25 years in a labor camp, and military collaborators often received six-year sentences in special settlements. Of 1.5 million POW returnees by March 1946, 43 percent continued their military service, 22 percent were drafted into labor battalions for two years, 18 percent were sent home, 15 percent were sent to a forced-labor camp, and two percent worked for repatriation commissions. Death sentences were rare. On 7 July 1945, a Supreme Soviet decree pardoned all former prisoners of war who had not collaborated. Another amnesty in 1955 released all remaining collaborators except those sentenced for torture or murder.

Former prisoners of war were not recognized as veterans and were denied veterans' benefits; they often faced discrimination due to the belief that they were traitors or deserters. In 1995, Russia equalized the status of former prisoners of war with that of other veterans. After the fall of the Eastern Bloc, the German government set up the Foundation Remembrance, Responsibility and Future to distribute further reparations, from which Soviet prisoners of war were not eligible to make claims. They did not receive any reparations until 2015, when the German government paid a symbolic amount of €2,500 to the few thousand still alive.

== Death toll ==
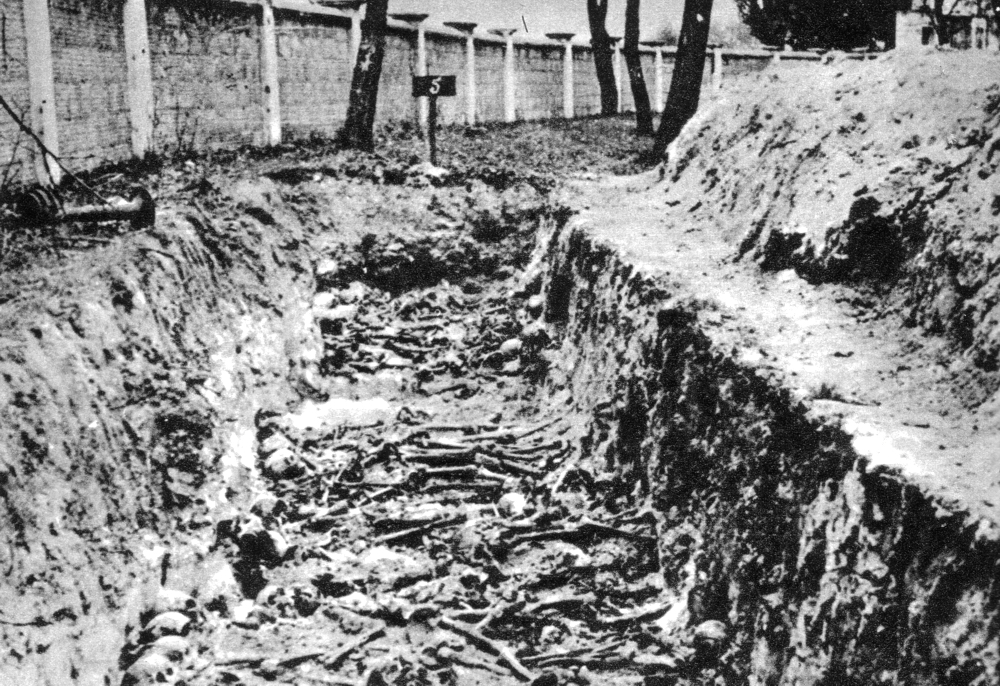
Mass grave of Soviet soldiers at the transit camp in Dęblin Fortress, German-occupied Poland

The German Army recorded 3.35 million Soviet prisoners captured in 1941, which exceeds the Red Army's reported missing by up to one million. This discrepancy can be partly explained by the Red Army's inability to keep track of losses during a chaotic withdrawal. Additionally, as many as one in eight of the people registered as Soviet prisoners of war had never been members of the Red Army. Some were mobilized, but never reached their units; others belonged to the NKVD or People's Militia, were from uniformed civilian services such as the railway corps and fortification workers, or were otherwise civilians. Historian Viktor Zemskov says that the German figures represent a minimum value, and should be adjusted upwards by 450,000 to account for prisoners who were killed before arriving in a camp. Zemskov estimates around 3.9 million dead out of 6.2 million captured, including 200,000 killed as military collaborators. Other historians, working from the German figure of 5.7 million captured, have reached lower estimates: Christian Streit's 3.3 million, Christian Hartmann's 3 million, and Dieter Pohl's 2.8 to 3 million.

A majority of the deaths, about two million, occurred before January 1942. The death rate of 300,000 to 500,000 each month from October 1941 to January 1942 is one of the highest death rates from mass atrocity in history, equaling the peak killings of Jews between July and October 1942. By this time, more Soviet prisoners of war had died than members of any other group targeted by the Nazis; only the European Jews would surpass this figure. An additional one million Soviet prisoners of war died after the beginning of 1942—27 percent of the total number of prisoners alive or captured after that date.

Most of the Soviet prisoners of war who died did so in the custody of the German Army. More than two million died in the Soviet Union; about 500,000, in the General Governorate (Poland); 400,000, in Germany; and 13,000, in German-occupied Norway. More than 28 percent of Soviet prisoners of war died in Finnish captivity; and 15 to 30 percent of Axis prisoners died in Soviet custody, despite the Soviet government's attempt to reduce the death rate. Throughout the war, Soviet prisoners of war had a far higher mortality rate than Polish or Soviet civilian forced laborers, whose rate was under 10 percent. Deaths of prisoners of war from the Soviet Union greatly exceeded deaths of prisoners from other nationalities; the second highest mortality rate was that of Italian military internees (six to seven percent).

== Legacy and historiography ==
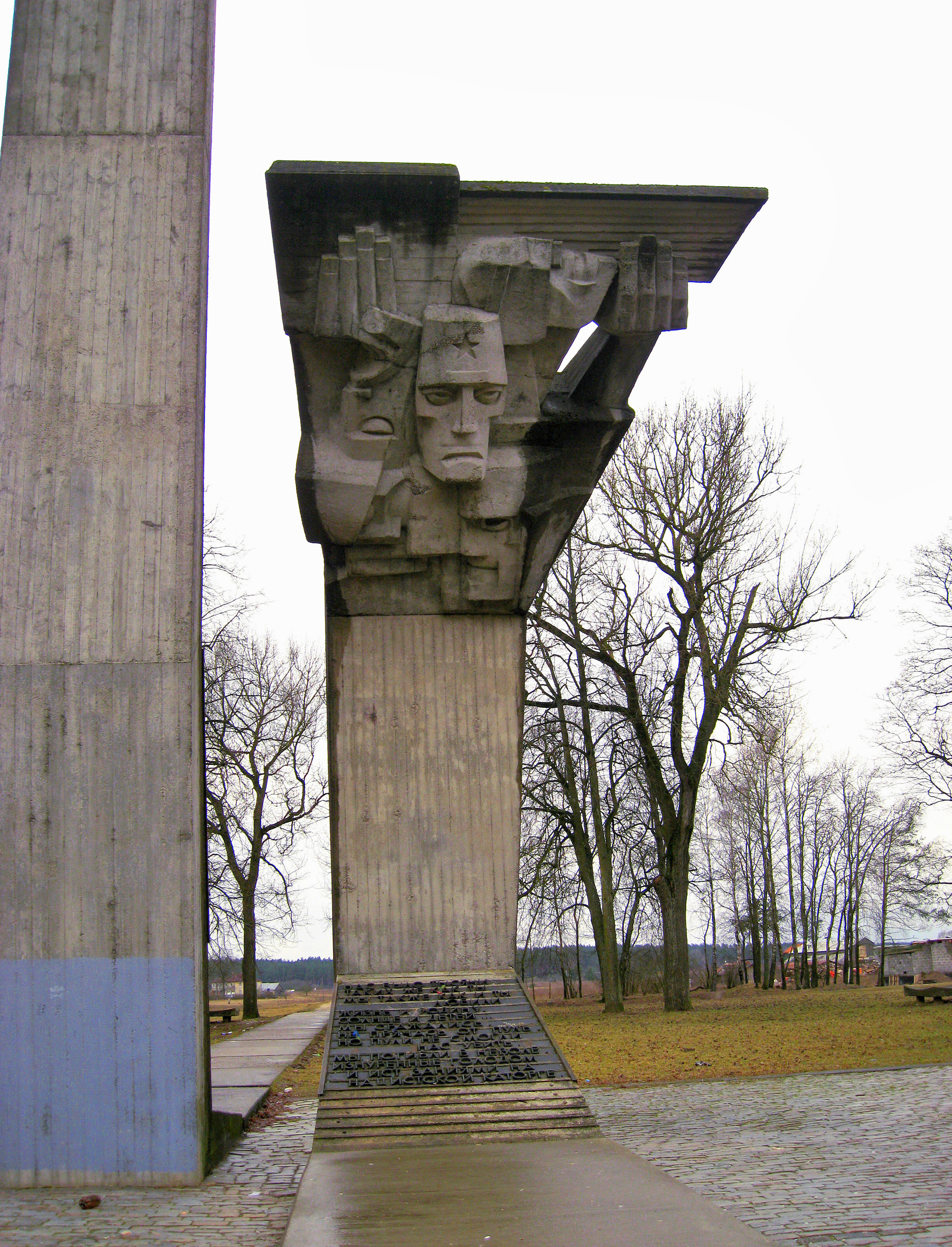
Monument to Soviet prisoners of war in Salaspils, Latvia

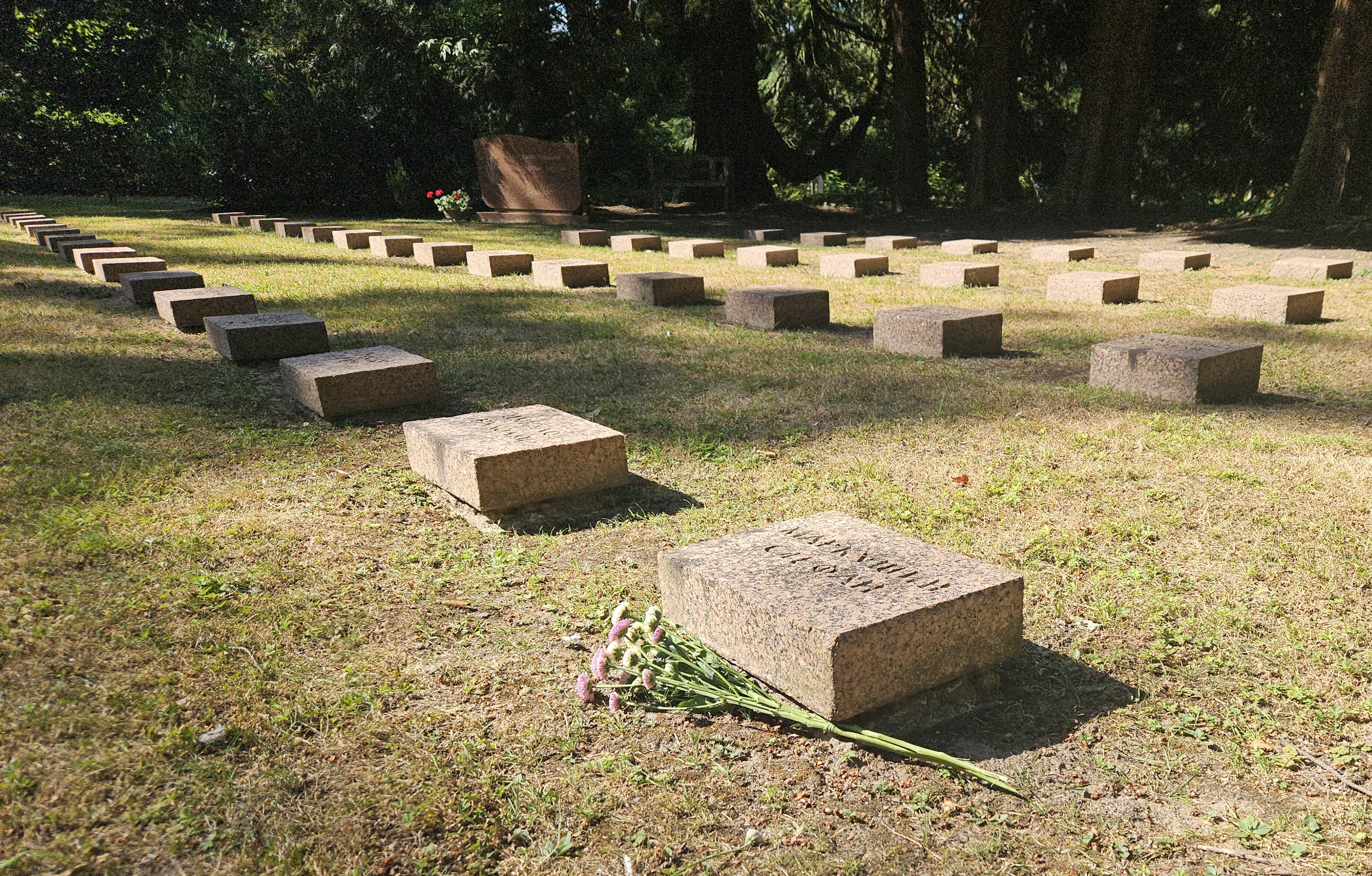
Soviet POW graves at Westfriedhof cemetery, Cologne

Hartmann calls the treatment of Soviet prisoners "one of the greatest crimes in military history". Thousands of books have been published about the Holocaust, but in 2016 there were no books in English about the fate of Soviet prisoners of war. The issue was also mostly ignored by Soviet historiography until the last years of the USSR. Few prisoner accounts were published, perpetrators were not tried for their crimes, and little scholarly research has been attempted. The German historian Christian Streit published the first major study of their fate in 1978, and the Soviet archives became available in 1990. Prisoners who remained in the occupied Soviet Union usually were not registered under their names, so their fates will never be known.

Although the treatment of prisoners of war was remembered by Soviet citizens as one of the worst aspects of the occupation, Soviet commemoration of the war focused on antifascism and those killed in combat. During perestroika in 1987 and 1988, a debate erupted in the Soviet Union about whether the former prisoners of war had been traitors; those arguing in the negative prevailed after the breakup of the Soviet Union. Russian nationalist historiography defended the former prisoners, minimizing incidents of defection and collaboration and emphasizing resistance.

The fate of Soviet prisoners of war was largely ignored in West and East Germany, where resistance activities were a focus. After the war, there were some German attempts to deflect the blame for the 1941 mass deaths. Some blamed the deaths on the failure of diplomacy between the Soviet Union and Germany after the invasion, or on prior starvation of soldiers by the Soviet government. Crimes against prisoners of war were exposed to the German public in the Wehrmacht exhibition around 2000, which challenged the still popular myth that the German military was not responsible for Nazi crimes. Memorials and markers have been established at cemeteries and former camps by state or private initiatives. For the 80th anniversary of World War II, several German historical and memorial organizations organized a traveling exhibition.

== Works cited ==
- Bartov, Omer (2023). "The Holocaust". In Gellately, Robert (ed.). The Oxford History of the Third Reich. Oxford University Press. pp. 190–216. doi:10.1093/oso/9780192886835.003.0008. ISBN 978-0-19-288683-5.
- Beorn, Waitman Wade (2018). The Holocaust in Eastern Europe: At the Epicenter of the Final Solution. Bloomsbury Academic. ISBN 978-1-4742-3219-7.
- Blank, Margot; Quinkert, Babette (2021). Dimensionen eines Verbrechens: Sowjetische Kriegsgefangene im Zweiten Weltkrieg | Dimensions of a Crime. Soviet Prisoners of War in World War II (in German and English). Metropol Verlag. ISBN 978-3-86331-582-5.
  - Quinkert, Babette. "Captured Red Army soldiers in the context of the criminal conduct of the war against the Soviet Union". In Blank & Quinkert (2021), pp. 172–193.
  - Keller, Rolf. ""...A necessary evil": use of Soviet prisoners of war as labourers in the German Reich, 1941–1945". In Blank & Quinkert (2021), pp. 194–205.
  - Kozlova, Daria. "Soviet prisoners of war in the concentration camps". In Blank & Quinkert (2021), pp. 206–223.
  - Meier, Esther; Winkel, Heike. "Unpleasant memories. Soviet prisoners of war in collective memory, in Germany and the Soviet Union / Russia". In Blank & Quinkert (2021), pp. 224–239.
  - Latyschew, Artem. "History of oblivion, recognition and study of former prisoners of war in the USSR and Russia". In Blank & Quinkert (2021), pp. 240–257.
- Cohen, Laurie R. (2013). Smolensk Under the Nazis: Everyday Life in Occupied Russia. Boydell & Brewer. ISBN 978-1-58046-469-7.
- "Consumer Price Index, 1800–". Federal Reserve Bank of Minneapolis. Archived from the original on 29 August 2024.
- Edele, Mark (2016). "Take (No) Prisoners! The Red Army and German POWs, 1941–1943". The Journal of Modern History. 88 (2): 342–379. doi:10.1086/686155. hdl:11343/238858. JSTOR 26547940.
- Edele, Mark (2017). Stalin's Defectors: How Red Army Soldiers became Hitler's Collaborators, 1941–1945. Vol. 1. Oxford University Press. doi:10.1093/oso/9780198798156.001.0001. ISBN 978-0-19-251914-6.
- Foreign Claims Settlement Commission (1968). Foreign Claims Settlement Commission of the United States: Decisions and Annotations. U.S. Government Printing Office. OCLC 1041397012.
- Gerlach, Christian (2016). The Extermination of the European Jews. Cambridge University Press. doi:10.1017/CBO9781139034180. ISBN 978-0-521-70689-6.
- Harrisville, David A. (2021). The Virtuous Wehrmacht: Crafting the Myth of the German Soldier on the Eastern Front, 1941–1944. Cornell University Press. doi:10.7591/cornell/9781501760044.001.0001. ISBN 978-1-5017-6005-1. JSTOR 10.7591/j.ctv1ffpcrj.
- Hartmann, Christian (2012). Wehrmacht im Ostkrieg: Front und militärisches Hinterland 1941/42 [Wehrmacht on the eastern front: front and rear areas 1941/42] (in German). Oldenbourg Wissenschaftsverlag. ISBN 978-3-486-70226-2.
- Hartmann, Christian (2013). Operation Barbarossa: Nazi Germany's War in the East, 1941–1945. Oxford University Press. ISBN 978-0-19-966078-0.
- Hertner, Christoph (2023). "»Kriegsgefangenschaft und Internierung«: Das Schicksal sowjetischer Militärpersonen in deutschen, schweizerischen, österreichischen und sowjetischen Quellen, 1941–1946, Workshop der Forschungsstelle Diplomatische Dokumente der Schweiz, der Professur für Neueste Allgemeine und Osteuropäische Geschichte der Universität Bern und des Deutschen Historischen Instituts Moskau in Bern, 24. März 2023" ["War captivity and internment": the fate of Soviet military personnel in German, Swiss, Austrian and Soviet sources, 1941–1946, workshop of the Diplomatic Documents of Switzerland, the Professorship for Modern General and East European History at the University of Bern, and the German Historical Institute Moscow. Bern, 24 March 2023]. Militärgeschichtliche Zeitschrift. 82 (2): 405–413. doi:10.1515/mgzs-2023-0063.
- Kay, Alex J. (2021). Empire of Destruction: A History of Nazi Mass Killing. Yale University Press. doi:10.2307/j.ctv1z9n1qs. ISBN 978-0-300-26253-7. JSTOR j.ctv1z9n1qs.
- Moore, Bob (2022). Prisoners of War: Europe: 1939–1956. Oxford University Press. doi:10.1093/oso/9780198840398.001.0001. ISBN 978-0-19-257680-4.
- Overmans, Rüdiger (2022). "Wehrmacht Prisoner of War Camps Introduction". The United States Holocaust Memorial Museum Encyclopedia of Camps and Ghettos, 1933–1945, Volume IV: Camps and Other Detention Facilities Under the German Armed Forces. Indiana University Press. pp. 1–37. doi:10.2307/j.ctv22fqbjk.8. ISBN 978-0-253-06091-4. JSTOR j.ctv22fqbjk.8.
- Otto, Reinhard; Keller, Rolf (2019). Sowjetische Kriegsgefangene im System der Konzentrationslager [Soviet prisoners of war in the concentration camp system] (PDF) (in German). New Academic Press. ISBN 978-3-7003-2170-5. Archived (PDF) from the original on 24 February 2024.
- Pohl, Dieter (2012). Die Herrschaft der Wehrmacht: Deutsche Militärbesatzung und einheimische Bevölkerung in der Sowjetunion 1941–1944 [The rule of the Wehrmacht: German military occupation and the local population in the Soviet Union 1941–1944] (in German). Oldenbourg Wissenschaftsverlag. ISBN 978-3-486-70739-7.
- Tooze, Adam (2008). The Wages of Destruction: The Making and Breaking of the Nazi Economy. Penguin Publishing Group. ISBN 978-1-101-56495-0.
- Wachsmann, Nikolaus (2015). KL: A History of the Nazi Concentration Camps. Macmillan. ISBN 978-0-374-11825-9.
- Westermann, Edward (2023). "The Hell of the Soviet Prisoner of War Camps" (PDF). Bulletin of the German Historical Institute. 72 (Fall 2023): 91–98. ISSN 1048-9134. Archived (PDF) from the original on 18 July 2024.
- Zemskov, Viktor (2011). "К вопросу о судьбе советских репатриантов в СССР (1944-1955)" [The Fate of Soviet Repatriates in the USSR (1944-1955)]. Политическое просвещение (Politpros.com) (in Russian).
- Zemskov, Viktor (2013). "K voprosu ob obshchey chislennosti sovetskikh voyennoplennykh i masshtabakh ikh smertnosti (1941–1945 gg.)" К вопросу об общей численности советских военнопленных и масштабах их смертности (1941–1945 гг.) [On the issue of the total number of Soviet prisoners of war and the scale of their mortality (1941–1945)]. Russian History (in Russian). 93 (47): 103–112. ISSN 0869-5687. Archived from the original on 26 March 2024.
