= Knowledge of the Holocaust in Nazi Germany and German-occupied Europe =

Public comprehension of the Holocaust

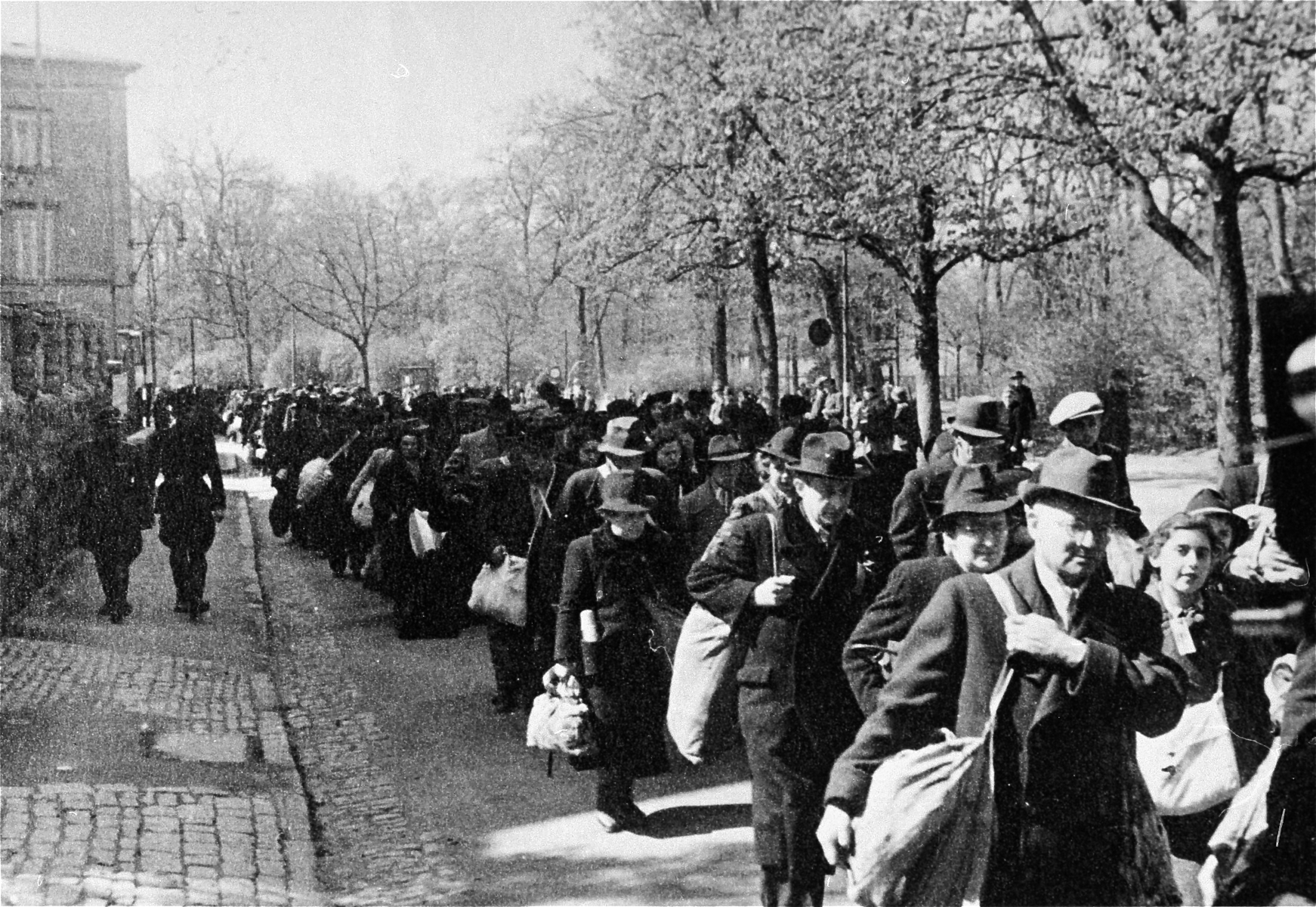
Jews are deported from Würzburg, 25 April 1942. Deportation occurred in public, and was witnessed by many Germans.

The question of how much knowledge German (and other European) civilians had about the Holocaust while it was happening has been studied and debated by historians. In Nazi Germany, it was an open secret among the population by 1943, Peter Longerich argues, but some authors place it even earlier. After the war, many Germans claimed that they were ignorant of the crimes perpetrated by the Nazi regime, a claim associated with the stereotypical phrase "Davon haben wir nichts gewusst" ("We knew nothing about that").

In German-occupied Europe, governments were acutely aware of the implications of their complicity, and that the general population, to varying degrees, were usually not aware of the implications of ghettoization and deportation. Governments such as the Vichy government in France are believed to have been keenly aware of their complicity with the Nazis' genocidal policies. With regard to general populations, the overall consensus amongst historians appears to be that many were aware of a hatred towards the Jews, but not so much that a significant comprehension of the Nazis' genocidal policies was reached.

== Nazi Germany ==
Knowledge of the Holocaust in Nazi Germany is a recurrent historical issue. The precise number of people who knew of the Final Solution is unknown. The larger population were at least acutely aware of the Nazi Party's antisemitism, if not advocates of the movement themselves. Numerous perspectives emerge when examining the degrees to which the larger population were aware that antisemitic practices enabled by the Nazi Party would eventuate to ethnic cleansing of the Jewish population. However, many historians argue that Germans were provided information explicit enough to indicate that the Jewish people were being massacred.

Although the mass murder of Jews took place outside of Germany, the mass killing of Soviet prisoners of war occurred within it and at an early date. By mid 1942 an estimated 227,000 had died after being deported to Germany. Many Germans were aware of these killings. Some Germans tried to help the prisoners, by giving them food or even aiding escapees. According to the Security Service reports, many Germans called for the death of these prisoners out of fear that feeding them would reduce their own rations.

=== Promulgation of genocidal messaging ===
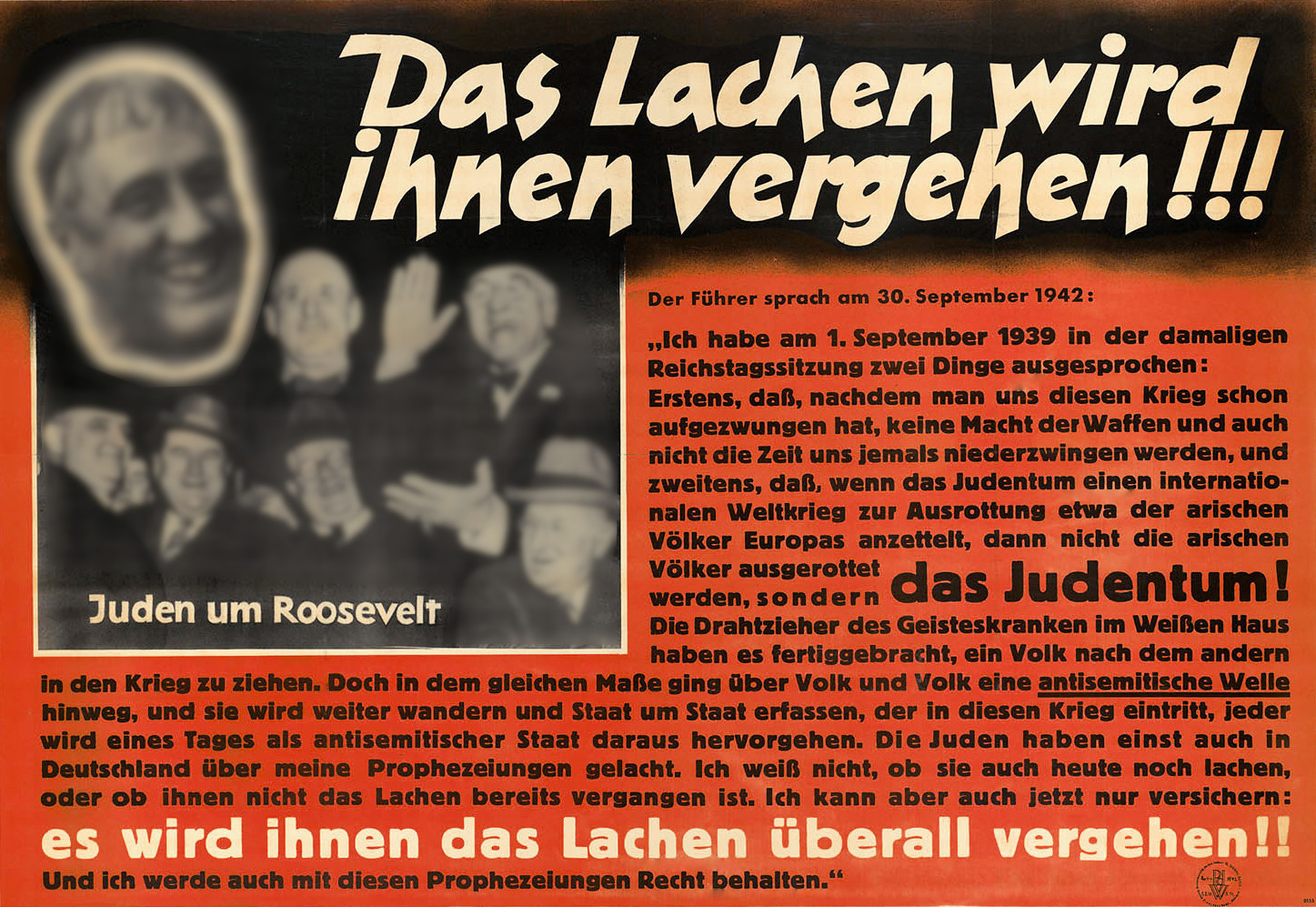
28 November 1942 issue of Parole der Woche states that Hitler's prophecy will come true, and Jews "will stop laughing everywhere".

Berlin Radio broadcast the mass-execution of Jews in Białystok and the burning of synagogues in July 1941. Numerous speeches spoken by Hitler in 1942 allude to the destruction of Jews. Notably, on 24 February 1942, Hitler's speech celebrating the Nazi Party's foundation alludes to his prophecy of 30 January 1939 in which he foresaw the destruction of European Jews. This speech was then reported the following day in the Niedersaechsische Tageszeitung. Hitler publicly referenced his original 1939 prophecy at least four times in the year 1942. Historians such as Confino and Koonz argue that Hitler's emphasis on this prophecy during the height of the Holocaust meant that it became a shared ideal among the society.

From the analysis of primary sources circulating during the Second World War, historian Ian Kershaw deduces that areas of Germany closer to Poland and Russia had more knowledge of the ongoing extermination of Jews, as they were physically closer to the killing areas. The names of extermination camps are rarely mentioned in primary sources originating from the Western side of the Reich. Comparatively, areas near the east of Europe make references to the camps. Particularly, primary sources report the Polish resistance movement comparing the Katyn massacre to the Auschwitz concentration camp.

=== Understanding the implications of deportation ===
Kershaw argues that there is a strong likelihood that German people understood the implications of deportation for evacuated Jews. There were numerous reports of mass shootings conducted in the Soviet Union, and it was known to the general German public that this was where German Jews would be deported to. Similarly, Kershaw argues that local SD (Sicherheitsdienst) reports provided enough information such that Germans who wanted to seek the purpose of deportation would likely find the answer. In July 1942, Karl Duerckefaelden, a Celle engineer, noted three instances in his everyday life where rumours of deportation circulated. In 1942-43, the White Rose, an anti-Nazi resistance group, produced a series of leaflets that were distributed amongst students at LMU Munich. One such leaflet stated,

"..since Poland was conquered, three hundred thousand Jews have been murdered in that country in the most bestial manner imaginable. In this we see a terrible crime against the dignity of mankind, a crime that cannot be compared with any other in the history of mankind. [...] But why are we bothering to tell you all this, since you know everything anyway? If you are not aware of these specific crimes, then surely you are aware of equally heinous crimes committed by these terrible subhumans? Because this touches on a question that affects all of us deeply, a question that must make us all stop and think: Why is the German nation behaving so apathetically in the face of all these most abominable, most degrading crimes?"

— the White Rose, 2nd leaflet, 1942

Knowledge of mass shootings

A report from Minden in December 1941 outlined how Jews were being deported to Warsaw in cattle cars, and, upon arrival, worked in factories, whilst the old and sick were shot. SD reports in April 1942 also outline how the Sicherheitspolizei were tasked with exterminating the Jews in German-occupied territories, where victims would dig their own graves before being shot. This information reached the Erfurt area of Germany. Kershaw also explores the accessibility of this information by referencing diaries of German people. German people who travelled for work were more likely able to access information on mass shootings. Karl Duerckefaelden's brother-in-law, who travelled to Dnieper, spoke to him of informants who had seen mass shootings first-hand. One informant spoke of the mass shooting of 118 Jews no longer fit for work, and two different mass burials of 50,000 and 80,000 Jews on the trip home.

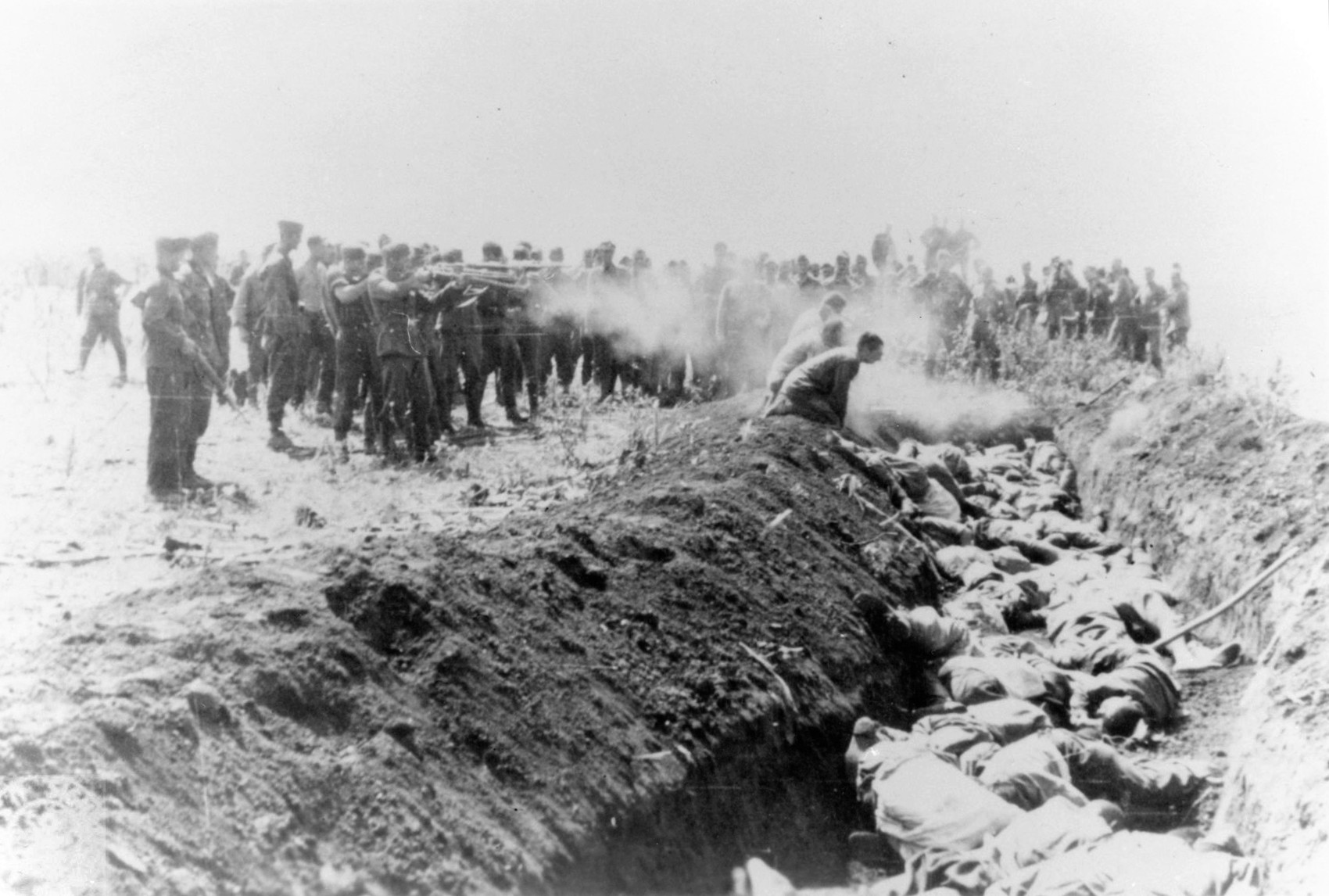
Mass shooting of Soviet civilians in 1941. By 1942, knowledge of the shootings was widespread in Germany.

=== Knowledge of concentration camps ===
According to Gellately, the German public initially understood that Nazi concentration camps were educative institutions for criminals. However, despite censorship, the German public eventually came to understand the likelihood of fatality if sent to a concentration camp. Prisoners began to appear in public spaces such as factories and city streets, and they often wore distinctive clothing with badges that signified their nationality and crime. The nature of concentration camps was made further obvious by the SS's public displays of violence towards inmates. Numerous interviews with German people mention either a cruel or murderous incident between guards and inmates. Usually, the inmate was beaten to death or shot for either disobeying or being unable to work.

=== Knowledge of gas chambers ===
According to historian Peter Fritzsche, although Germans could learn of reports of shootings of Jews in the east, "there is little evidence of semi-public or public knowledge about Auschwitz or gas chambers". According to Longerich, it was not widely known that Jews were exterminated using gas chambers. In contrast, Bankier argues that by 1943, gas as a killing method was widely discussed, although there were inaccuracies that gave rise to misconceptions of how the gassings were practiced. Fritsche disputes Bankier's interpretation, stating that evidence better supports German public knowledge of shootings in the Soviet Union which "provided the dominant template for knowledge", and that "most people knew about Babi Yar but not Auschwitz". Reports and interviews only made vague and infrequent references to victims being gassed in cattle trucks of trains in tunnels, and this information, if disseminated, was done so via foreign broadcasts and rumours from soldiers. Indictment of German individuals reveal that some of the public knew of the gas chambers, but were censored. In the Munich Special Court in 1943, a woman recalls discussing foreign broadcasts with her neighbour which outlined how Jewish women and children were segregated from the "Aryan" population, and then killed with gas. In 1944, also in the Munich Special Court, an Augsburg furniture removal man was indicted for having declared that the "Führer" was a mass-murderer who had Jews loaded into a wagon and exterminated by gas.

== German-occupied Europe ==
=== The Netherlands ===
There are competing views amongst historians regarding the Dutch public's knowledge of the Holocaust. Some historians argue that the majority of the Dutch had a complete understanding of the Holocaust. After analyzing Queen Wilhelmina's wartime speeches, social scientist Jord Schaap concluded that the Holocaust was known in the Netherlands between 1940 and 1945. According to Schaap, the key issue was whether or not the Dutch would believe the information. Similarly, Vuijsje in his book Against Better Knowledge: Self-Deception and Denial in Dutch Historiography of the Persecution of the Jews, argues that public knowledge was extensive, but the Dutch public denied the information because of their inability to act against the reality. Other historians contend that many of the Dutch had fragmented knowledge of the Holocaust. Loe de Jong, director of the Dutch State Institute of War Documentation and Dutch historian, argues that while information about the Holocaust was available to the general public, a large proportion of Dutch Jews thought it incomprehensible that their deportation would result in deaths by gassing. De Jong argues that knowledge of mass extermination was only acquired after World War II had ended. Similarly, historian Friedlander argues that even those who were in close proximity to the killing sites had little knowledge of what happened to deported Jews.

==== Public awareness of Nazi policy of systematic murder ====
Van der Boom's analysis of Dutch diaries reveals that the public knew the Jewish people were deliberately singled out to be sent to concentration camps in Poland. The Jewish people were also aware of the Nazi's wish to practice genocide. Many diarists from Amsterdam particularly, conclude that death would be imminent for Jews. Diaries from Etty Hillesum, an aspiring writer and Joop Voet, a young accountant, both discussed a recognition that Jews were the enemies of Germany and that the Nazis would seek their extermination. Deportation was famously described by Anne Frank as a march of death. However, most diarists were convinced that whilst they would be treated harshly and potentially face death, they did not think they would be killed immediately upon arrival.

==== Awareness of Nazi methods of prisoner treatment ====
Some of the Dutch heard about prisoners' death by Nazis' experimentation, that is, where Jews would be compelled to be subjects of supposed science experiments. This story circulated in the early 1940s in response to the mortality rates in Mauthausen. This story was mentioned by four diarists analysed by Van der Boom.

Knowledge of mass shootings first appeared in a BBC report in 1942. Later that year, eyewitness stories of Jews forced to dig their own graves were recorded by two diarists. Ten other diarists also spoke of mass executions by shooting.

Nazis' infliction of death by gassing was spoken of by diarists, and many did believe in the information. Thirty-five out of the 164 diarists wrote of Jews being gassed. This knowledge originated from detailed reports on Auschwitz, the deportation of Hungarian Jews, news reports and eyewitness accounts of the liberation of camps. A number of diarists did not believe it to be a real practice by the Nazis because they deemed that there was either not enough evidence or that the evidence was not reliable.

==== Knowledge regarding concentration camps ====
Van der Boom argues that by examining the obedience of victims, it can be concluded that immediate murder was unknown amongst the Dutch Jewry. It remained unclear to diarists whether going into hiding would be less dangerous than being deported to concentration camps. Half of Jewish diarists and a quarter of Gentile diarists referred to the destination of deportation trains as a great unknown. Out of the 164 diaries examined by Van der Boom, only 24 implied that the deported Jews would be interned in camps. Of the remaining diaries, 61% discuss labour explicitly whilst another 24% imply being interned at camps.

Another diarist, Philip Mechanicus, assumed there to be three types of camps. Firstly, he believed there was a camp for the privileged, such as Theresienstadt or Bergen-Belsen. Secondly, he believed there to be labour camps for the majority of deportees and then thirdly, concentration camps for Jews who had to be punished for whatever reason. Joop Voet, also appears to have misunderstood the nature of concentration camps writing that he would take his children into hiding because he would likely be unable to take care of them properly at the camps and its severity would kill his children. Many Jews appeared to have thought that deportees would still be able to survive at concentration camps. Kruisinga, the notary public who had heard numerous gassing rumours expressed surprise in his diaries when unable to contact a deported Jew to discuss business affairs: "It is easier to arouse the spirit of Julius Caesar than to get a letter from a Jewish client in a labor camp in eastern Germany." Van der Boom argues that if the victims knew of their fate upon deportation they would have most definitely acted differently and sought hiding.

=== Belarus ===
Olga Baranova argues that it is undeniable that the people of Belarus had a clear awareness of the Nazi's genocidal intent as they were first-hand witnesses. She argues that by examining the actions of the Belarusians, it can be deduced that the general public understood the imminence of death that came with ghettoisation.

==== Collaborators ====
From examining how some Belarusians collaborated with the Nazis, Baranova finds a clear awareness of the Nazi's genocidal policies. People who participated in disclosure would have understood the consequences of their actions as the Nazis' collective responsibility policies would execute entire families. Some Belarusians believed that by cooperating with the Nazis, they would increase their own chance of survival. Complicity from the Belarusian public ranged from: acceptance of Nazi policies, ignoring Jewish neighbours who needed assistance with food and shelter and disclosing to Nazi authorities about Jews in hiding. Some Belarusians participated in rounding up Belarusian Jewry and guarded the ghettos and concentration camps. Local auxiliary policemen also participated in the mass shootings. Such collaboration occurred in the Western part of Belarus, which was under civilian administration (the Generalkommissariat Weißruthenien) and Eastern Belarus, which was overseen by the German Army Group Centre.

==== Rescuers ====
Baranova explores also, that by looking to the actions of those who assisted Jews in escaping the ghettos, it can be shown that the Belarusian knew of imminent death upon relocation to ghettos. The memoirs of Holocaust survivor Georgji Elper describe his experiences in the Minsk ghetto, and being saved by a Belarusian woman. His memoirs also recall how he and other deportees heard of Jews exterminated by death squads and being sent to city ghettos. There are also several instances when individuals accepted appointment to positions in local administration, with the intention of protecting the Jews in Belarus. Elper recalls how he heard how a Belarusian policeman told a Jewish girl about an upcoming pogrom. From this forewarning, a secret storeroom was constructed which hid and saved the lives of many Jews. Other means of assistance also included forgery, so that Jews could escape ghettos.

== Nazi allies ==
=== Hungary ===
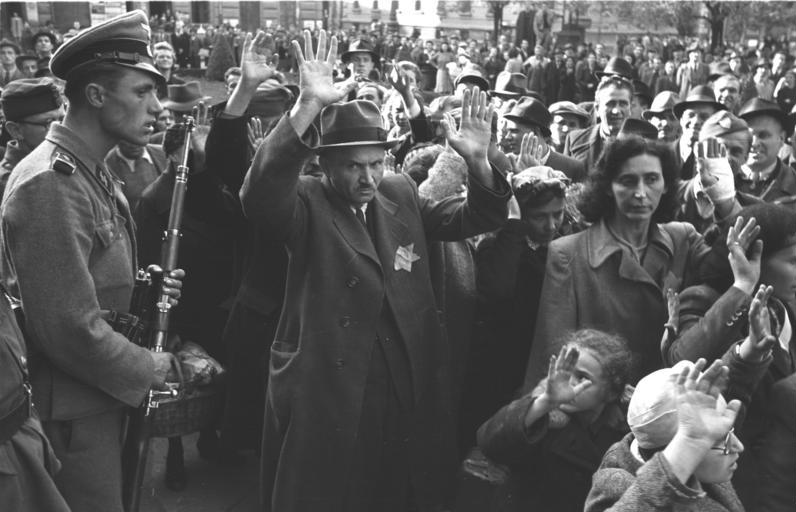
Jewish people wearing the Yellow Badge are rounded up by police in Hungary.

Implementation of German policies did not occur without the knowledge of the Hungarian government. Hungarian national and local officials made key decisions concerning the implementation of anti-Jewish measures and were aware of the Nazis' genocidal intent. Hungarians who worked near the concentration camps were witnesses of deportation and executions.

==== Elite understanding of Nazi policies ====
Historians Vági, Csősz, and Kádár argue that the government had a clear understanding of the Nazi's genocidal policies and actively collaborated with the regime. György Ottlik's 1944 report to the Hungarian Ministry of Foreign Affairs reflects an awareness of the change in Nazi policy, that is one from discrimination to systemic genocide. His report outlines how the Nazis had begun justifying the genocide so as to convince the Sztójay to cooperate with their policies. Ottlik's report also discusses how France was already cooperating with Nazi policies at the time of the report. Horthy's memorandum to the Sztójay outlines how he was forced in a situation where he was not allowed to intervene with German policies. Horthy describes the Jewish question as cruel and inhumane. The Hungarian elite also had significant knowledge of the Nazi's genocidal policies. The Relief and Rescue Committee in Budapest, run by Zionist activists, bargained for the lives of Jews with Nazi officials. The committee would offer cash, valuables, contacts, promises of alibis in exchange for the lives of over a thousand Jews.

==== Ghettoisation ====
The Hungarian Interior Ministry issued a confidential ghettoisation order and defined the parameters. County officials decided which towns would have ghettos. For example, a May 1944 letter from the prefect of Vas County to chief administrative officers and mayors revealed that the deputy prefect decided that seven ghettos were to be established in the county. Mayors were responsible for determining ghettos' precise locations. In Kormend, for example, chief administrative officers and deputy prefects decided that the boundaries of the ghetto were to be the streets surrounding the synagogue: Széchenyi Street, Gróf Apponyi Street, Dienes Lajos Street, and Rábamellék Street.

==== Hungarian public ====
Hungarian soldiers and labor servicemen were the first members of the Hungarian public to know of the Nazi's genocidal policies; they saw, first-hand, the execution of Jews on the Eastern Front. The journals of Miksa Fenyő, editor of Nyugat ['West'], a literary journal that catalysed modern movements, demonstrate that Jews had access to information regarding the Holocaust. In one of his entries, he records a visit from one of his sources and discusses witnessing 600,000 Jews being dragged away to be killed. Fenyo's source also mentions that the killings are committed by both the Gestapo and the Hungarian guard. In a testimony, Father John S recounted seeing trainloads of Hungarian Jews upon peering through a fence and seeing one man being struck down by an SS guard. From examining about 5,000 Hungarian testimonials, the staff of the Hungarian Jewish relief organisation, National Committee for Attending Deportees (DEGOB), concluded that most Hungarian Jews deported to Auschwitz were unaware that they would be killed upon arrival. Refugees from Poland and Slovakia tried to warn Hungarian Jews of the consequences of deportation. A student from Munkács, T. F., was informed of Auschwitz from disclosure by his Slovak cousin.

=== Slovakia ===
The highest levels of the Slovak government were aware by late 1941 of mass murders of Jews in German-occupied territories. In July 1941, Wisliceny organized a visit by Slovak government officials to several camps run by Organization Schmelt, which imprisoned Jews in East Upper Silesia to employ them in forced labor on the Reichsautobahn. The visitors understood that Jews in the camps lived under conditions which would eventually cause their deaths. Slovak soldiers participated in the invasions of Poland and the Soviet Union; they brought word of the mass shootings of Jews, and participated in at least one of the massacres. Some Slovaks were aware of the 1941 Kamianets-Podilskyi massacre, in which 23,600 Jews, many of them deported from Hungary, were shot in western Ukraine. Defense minister Ferdinand Čatloš and General Jozef Turanec reported massacres in Zhytomyr to President Jozef Tiso by February 1942. Both bishop Karol Kmeťko and papal chargé d'affaires Giuseppe Burzio confronted the president with reliable reports of the mass murder of Jewish civilians in Ukraine. In early 1942, Hanns Ludin, the German ambassador to Slovakia, reported that the Slovaks were enthusiastic about the deportation of their Jewish population. Eventually, the Slovak government agreed to pay 500 Reichsmarks each for the deportation of two-thirds of their Jewish population.

== See also ==
- Evidence and documentation for the Holocaust
- Good Germans – Germans who after the war denied that they had known about the Holocaust.
- Historiography of German resistance to Nazism
- International response to the Holocaust
- Pilecki's Report – a report by Witold Pilecki, who had himself imprisoned in Auschwitz to gather information
- Victor Martin – Sociologist involved with the WWII Belgian Resistance

== Sources ==
- Baranova, Olga (2016). "Collaborators, Bystanders or Rescuers? The Role of Local Citizens in the Holocaust in Nazi-Occupied Belarus". The Holocaust and European Societies: Social Processes and Social Dynamics. Palgrave Macmillan UK. pp. 89–103. ISBN 978-1-137-56984-4.
- Fritzsche, Peter (2008). "The Holocaust and the Knowledge of Murder". The Journal of Modern History. 80 (3): 594–613. doi:10.1086/589592. S2CID 145269269.
- Gerlach, Christian (2016). The Extermination of the European Jews. Cambridge University Press. ISBN 978-0-521-70689-6.
- Hutzelmann, Barbara (2016). "Slovak Society and the Jews: Attitudes and Patterns of Behaviour". In Bajohr, Frank; Löw, Andrea (eds.). The Holocaust and European Societies: Social Processes and Social Dynamics. London: Springer. pp. 167–185. ISBN 978-1-137-56984-4.
- Hutzelmann, Barbara (2018). "Einführung: Slowakei" [Introduction: Slovakia]. In Hutzelmann, Barbara; Hausleitner, Mariana; Hazan, Souzana (eds.). Slowakei, Rumänien und Bulgarien [Slovakia, Romania, and Bulgaria]. Die Verfolgung und Ermordung der europäischen Juden durch das nationalsozialistische Deutschland 1933–1945 [The Persecution and Murder of European Jews by Nazi Germany 1933–1945] (in German). Vol. 13. Munich: De Gruyter. pp. 18–45. ISBN 978-3-11-049520-1.
- Longerich, Peter (2010). Holocaust: The Nazi Persecution and Murder of the Jews. Oxford: Oxford University Press. ISBN 978-0-19-280436-5.
- Nižňanský, Eduard (2011). "The discussions of Nazi Germany on the deportation of Jews in 1942 – the examples of Slovakia, Rumania and Hungary" (PDF). Historický časopis. 59 (Supplement): 111–136. ISSN 0018-2575.
- Rajcan, Vanda; Vadkerty, Madeline; Hlavinka, Ján (2018). "Slovakia". In Megargee, Geoffrey P.; White, Joseph R.; Hecker, Mel (eds.). Camps and Ghettos under European Regimes Aligned with Nazi Germany. Encyclopedia of Camps and Ghettos. Vol. 3. Bloomington: United States Holocaust Memorial Museum. pp. 842–852. ISBN 978-0-253-02373-5.
- Ward, James Mace (2013). Priest, Politician, Collaborator: Jozef Tiso and the Making of Fascist Slovakia. Ithaca: Cornell University Press. ISBN 978-0-8014-6812-4.
