= Historiography of German resistance to Nazism =

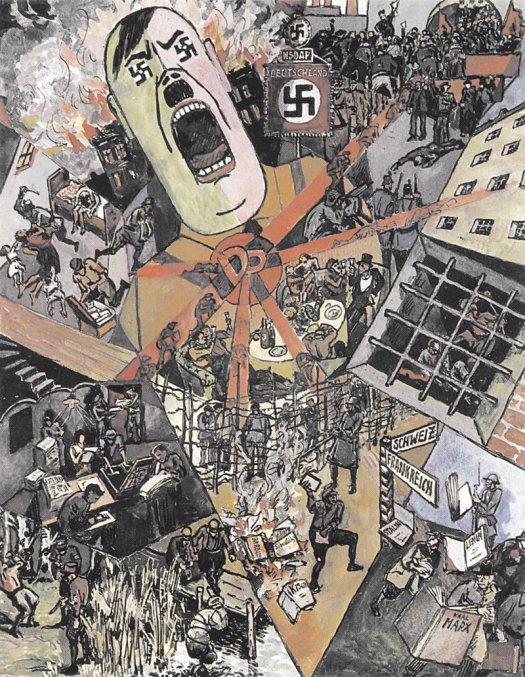
"The Third Reich", 1934 painting by the anti-Nazi exile German painter Heinrich Vogeler.

Historiographical debates on the subject on Widerstand have often featured intense arguments about the nature, extent and effectiveness of resistance in the Third Reich. In particular, debate has focused around what to define as Widerstand (resistance).

== Immediate post-war period ==
Within both the Federal Republic of Germany and the German Democratic Republic, the memory of Widerstand was harnessed after 1949 as a way of providing legitimacy to the two rival German states. In East Germany, the focus was unabashedly on celebrating the KPD, which was represented as the only anti-fascist force in Germany; non-Communist resistance was either ignored or slighted. In East Germany, historical work on the subject of Widerstand was highly politicized and portrayed members of the KPD resistance as heroes. The general tone of East German work on the subject was well summarized by the introduction to the 1974 book Die deutsche antifaschistische Widerstandsbewegung, which stated:

"The German anti-fascist resistance movement, especially the KPD and the forces allied to it, embodied the progressive line of German policy. The most consistent political force of this movement, the KPD, carried out from the first day of the fascist dictatorship, organized and, centrally directed the struggle against imperialism ... The expression of the victory of the resolute anti-fascists after the smashing of fascism by the Soviet Union, and the other states of the Anti-Hitler coalition, and the defeat of German imperialism is the existence of the GDR in which the legacy of the best of the German people who gave their lives in the anti-fascist struggle was realized".

In West Germany, the first works to appear on the subject, such as the books by Hans Rothfels and Gerhard Ritter, were intended both to rebut the "collective guilt" accusations against the German people by showing the existence of the "other Germany", and to prevent another Dolchstoßlegende from emerging by portraying those involved in Widerstand activities in as heroic light as possible. Under the influence of the Cold War, starting in the late 1940s, and continuing throughout the 1950s, historiographical work on the subject in the Federal Republic came to increasing exclude the KPD, and assigned a minor role to the SPD. In his biography of Goerdeler, Ritter drew a distinction between those Germans working for the defeat of their country, and those Germans working to overthrow the Nazi regime while being loyal to Germany. Thus, in Ritter's view, Goerdeler was a patriot while those involved in the Rote Kapelle were traitors who deserved to be executed. In general, West German historians in the 1950s came to define Widerstand as only including national-conservatives involved in the 20 July plot, and a "monumentalization" and "heroicization" of Widerstand occurred with those being involved being credited as acting from the highest possible ethical and moral motives. In the 1950s, resistance was depicted as middle-class and Christian with the emphasis on the heroic individual standing alone against tyranny.

== 1960s–1970s and re-examination of Widerstand ==
Starting in the 1960s, a younger generation of West German historians such as Hans Mommsen started to provide a more critical assessment of Widerstand within German elites, and came to decry the "monumentalization" of the 1950s. In two articles published in 1966, Mommsen proved the claim often advanced in the 1950s that the ideas behind "men of 20 July" were the inspiration for the 1949 Basic Law of the Federal Republic was false. Mommsen showed that the ideas of national-conservative opponents of the Nazis had their origins in the anti-Weimar right of the 1920s, that the system the national-conservatives wished to build in place of Nazism was not a democracy, and that national-conservatives wished to see a "Greater Germany" ruling over much of Central and Eastern Europe.

Increasingly, West German historians started in the 1960s and 1970s to examine Widerstand outside of elites, and by focusing on resistance by ordinary people to challenge the popular notion that had been "resistance without the people". An example of the changing trend in historical research was a series of local studies of varying degrees of quality on working-class resistance movements associated with the SPD and the KPD published in the 1970s, which shed much light on these previously little known movements. As the historical genre of Alltagsgeschichte (history of everyday life) started to enjoy increasing popularity as a research topic in the 1970s–80s, historians became more preoccupied with that they considered to be "everyday" resistance by individuals acting outside of any sort of organization".

The so-called "Bavaria Project" of the 1970s, an effort made by the Institute of Contemporary History to comprehensively document "everyday life" in Bavaria during the Third Reich did much to spur research into this area. The first director of the "Bavaria Project", Peter Hüttenberger, defined Widerstand as "every form of rebellion against at least potentially total rule within the context of asymmetrical relations of rule". For Hüttenberger, "symmetrical" rule occurs when there is a "bargain" struck between the different interests of the rulers and ruled which leads more or less to a "balance"; "asymmetrical rule" occurs when there is no "bargain" and the state seeks total Herrschaft (domination) over the ruled. For this reason, Hüttenberger discounted the East German claim that the KPD had been engaging in anti-Nazi resistance during the Weimar Republic. Hüttenberger argued that democracy is a form of "symmetrical" rule, and therefore merely being an opposition party under a democracy does not qualify as resistance.

Seen within this perspective as defined by Hüttenberger, any effort made to resist the claim of total Herrschaft, no matter how minor was a form of Widerstand. Thus, the six volumes which comprised the "Bavaria Project" edited by the project's second director, Martin Broszat depicted actions such as refusal to give the Nazi salute as a type of resistance. Moreover, the emphasis upon resistance in "everyday life" in the "Bavaria Project" portrayed Widerstand not as a total contrast between black and white, but rather in shades of grey, noting that people who often refused to behave as the Nazi regime wanted in one area often conformed in other areas; as an example the Bavarian peasants who did business with Jewish cattle dealers in the 1930s despite the efforts of the Nazi regime to stop these transactions otherwise often expressed approval of the anti-Semitic laws. Rather than defining resistance as a matter of intention, Broszat and his associates came to define Widerstand as a matter of Wirkung (effect) as a means of blocking the Nazi regime's total claim to control all aspects of German life, regardless of whether the intentions were political or not.

=== Resistenz ===
Realizing that not every action that blocked the Nazi regime's total claims should be considered a form of Widerstand, Broszat devised the controversial concept of Resistenz (immunity). By Resistenz, Broszat meant the ability of certain sections of German society, such as the Wehrmacht, the Roman Catholic Church and the bureaucracy, to enjoy immunity from the Nazis' claims to total power and to continue functioning according to their traditions and practices without seeking to fundamentally challenge the Nazi regime. Broszat's concept was used to advance the notion that, at least at the local level, there was much continuity in Germany between the Weimar and Nazi eras.

The Resistenz concept was often criticized by other historians for seeking to change the focus from "behavior" and intentions towards the Nazi regime towards the "effect" on one's actions on the regime. One of Broszat's leading critics, the Swiss historian Walter Hofer commented that in his view: "The concept of Resistenz leads to a levelling down of fundamental resistance against the system on the one hand and actions criticizing more or less accidental, superficial manifestations on the other: the tyrannicide appears on the same plane as the illegal cattle-slaughterer". Moreover, Hofter noted that the things that Broszat labeled Resistenz had no effect within the grander scheme of things on the ability of the Nazi regime to accomplish its objectives within Germany. Another of Broszat's critics, the German historian Klaus-Jürgen Müller argued that the term Widerstand should apply only to those having a "will to overcome the system" and that Broszat's Resistenz concept did too much to muddy the waters between by speaking of societal "immunity" to the regime. A more sympathetic appraisal of the Resistenz concept came from the historians Manfred Messerschmidt and Heinz Boberach who argued that Widerstand should be defined from the viewpoint of the Nazi state, and any activity that was contrary to the regime's wishes, such as listerning to jazz music, should be considered as a form of Widerstand. Hans Mommsen wrote about the Resistenz concept:

This raises, of course, the issue of how to distinguish between resistance that intended to overthrow the system, and active Resistenz (though judged from the angle of convictions of the individual, this constitutes an artificial separation). Those who risked their lives to hide Jewish fellow citizens and acquire forged exit permits for them, those who tried to help Russian prisoners-of-war, those who, at their workplaces, fought for the rights of workers and refused to be indoctrinated by the German Labour Front, those who protested against the treatment of the Jewish population or publicly denounced the euthanasia programme, those who refused to obey criminal orders, those who as a powerless protest against Nazi war policies daubed slogans on walls at night-time, those who protected the persecuted and shared their ration cards with them—in a wider sense they all belonged to the resistance.

== Der Deutsche Widerstand und die Juden ==
As part of a critical evaluation of those involved in anti-Nazi work, the German historian Christof Dipper in his 1983 essay "Der Deutsche Widerstand und die Juden" (translated into English as "The German Resistance and the Jews") argued that the majority of the anti-Nazi national-conservatives were anti-Semitic. Dipper wrote that for the majority of the national-conservatives "the bureaucratic, pseudo-legal deprivation of the Jews practiced until 1938 was still considered acceptable". Though Dipper noted no-one in the Widerstand movement supported the Holocaust, he also commented that the national-conservatives did not intend to restore civil rights to the Jews after the overthrow of Hitler. Dipper went on to argue that based on such views held by opponents of the regime that for "a large part of the German people...believed that a "Jewish Question" existed and had to be solved...".

In response to Dipper's charges, the Canadian historian Peter Hoffmann in his 2004 essay "The German Resistance and the Holocaust" sought to disapprove Dipper's thesis. Hoffmann argued that the majority of those involved in the 20 July putsch attempt were motivated in large part to moral objections to the Shoah. In particular, Hoffmann used the example of Claus von Stauffenberg's moral outrage to witnessing the massacre of Russian Jews in 1942, and of Carl Friedrich Goerdeler's advice in 1938–39 to his contact with British intelligence, the industrialist A.P. Young that the British government should take a tough line with the Nazi regime in regards to its anti-Semitism. The Israeli historian Danny Orbach in his 2010 book Valkyrie: Hahitnagdut Hagermanit Lehitler defended the German resistance fighters, particularly Goerdeler, against the charge that they were anti-Semitic by noting Goerdeler's strong support for Zionism, the importance of the Holocaust in the motives of the National-Conservative resistance, as well as attempts of other German resistance fighters to save persecuted Jews. In a recent article, Orbach also argued that Dipper's accusations of antisemitism are based on a misreading, if not distortion, of the primary sources, above all Goerdeler's memoranda on the Jewish Question.

== Other views ==
Another viewpoint advanced in the debate was that of Mommsen, who cautioned against the use of overtly rigid terminology, and spoke of a wide type of "resistance practice" (Widerstandspraxis), by which he meant that there were different types and forms of resistance, and that resistance should be considered a "process", in which individuals came to increasingly reject the Nazi system in its entirety. As an example of resistance as a "process", Mommsen used the example of Carl Friedrich Goerdeler, who initially supported the Nazis, became increasing disillusioned over Nazi economic policies while serving as Price Commissioner in the mid-1930s, and by the late 1930s was committed to Hitler's overthrow. Mommsen described national-conservative resistance as "a resistance of servants of the state", who, over time, came to gradually abandon their former support of the regime, and instead steadily came to accept that the only way of bringing about fundamental change was to seek the regime's destruction. In regards to the idea of "resistance as a process", several historians have worked out typologies. The German historian Detlev Peukert created a typology running from "nonconformity" (mostly done in private and not including total rejection of the Nazi system), "refusal of co-operation" (Verweigerung), "protest", and finally, "resistance" (those committed to the overthrow of the regime). The Austrian historian Gerhard Botz argued for a typology starting with "deviant behavior" (minor acts of non-conformity), "social protest", and "political resistance".

The British historian Sir Ian Kershaw has argued that there are two approaches to the Widerstand question, one of which he calls the fundamentalist (dealing with those committed to overthrowing the Nazi regime) and the societal (dealing with forms of dissent in "everyday life"). In Kershaw's viewpoint, the Resistenz concept works well in an Alltagsgeschichte approach, but works less well in the field of high politics, and moreover by focusing only on the "effect" of one's actions, fails to consider the crucial element of the "intention" behind one's actions. Kershaw has argued that the term Widerstand should be used only for those working for the total overthrow of the Nazi system, and those engaging in behavior which was counter to the regime's wishes without seeking to overthrow the regime should be included under the terms opposition and dissent, depending upon their motives and actions. Kershaw has used the Edelweiss Pirates as an example of whose behavior initially fell under dissent, and who advanced from there to opposition and finally to resistance. Similarly, the American historian Claudia Koonz in her 1992 article "Ethical Dilemmas and Nazi Eugenics", argued that those who protested against the Action T4 program, usually for religious reasons while remaining silent about the Holocaust cannot be considered as part of any resistance to the Nazis, and these protests can only be considered as a form of dissent. In Kershaw's opinion, there were three bands ranging from dissent to opposition to resistance. In Kershaw's view, there was much dissent and opposition within German society, but outside of the working-class, very little resistance. Though Kershaw has argued that the Resistenz concept has much merit, overall he concluded that the Nazi regime had a broad basis of support and consensus, and it is correct to speak of "resistance without the people".

== See also ==
- Knowledge of the Holocaust in Nazi Germany and German-occupied Europe
