= Empire of Destruction =

2021 book by Alex J. Kay

Empire of Destruction: A History of Nazi Mass Killing
- Author: Alex J. Kay
- Language: English
- Publisher: Yale University Press
- Publication date: 2021

Empire of Destruction: A History of Nazi Mass Killing is a 2021 book by British historian Alex J. Kay published by Yale University Press.

== Content ==
According to Kay, the groups subjected to mass killing by Nazi Germany, on the order of tens of thousands of victims or more, were 300,000 disabled people, as many as 100,000 Polish elites, nearly six million European Jews, 200,000 Romani people, at least 2 million Soviet urban residents targeted by the hunger policy, nearly 3.3 million Soviet prisoners of war, about 1 million rural inhabitants during anti-partisan warfare (excluding actual partisans), and 185,000 Polish civilians killed during and after the Warsaw Uprising. The total number of deaths from mass killing would thus amount to at least 13 million. Kay argues that all these groups, including Jews, "were regarded by the Nazi regime in one way or another as a potential threat" to Germany's war effort. However, viewing them as a threat was informed by Nazi racial theory, making it hard to separate racist versus strategic reasons for killing. The book is organized partly thematically and partly chronologically with chapters on each of the groups targeted.

== Reception ==
In German History, reviewer Maris Rowe-McCulloch writes that the book is "an excellent study" that "coherently brings together a range of findings" from up to date scholarship.

Waitman Wade Beorn called the book "a truly exceptional book that will be of great interest to general readers and students as well as academics" and praised its coverage of less recognized aspects of Nazi violence and for illustrating the connections between different murder operations. Nevertheless, he questioned its heavy reliance on German-language scholarship and lack of attention to non-German perpetrators.

Jan Burzlaff called the book "an inclusive, compelling, and innovative history of the mass killing of some 12.86 million civilians under Nazi rule".

== Sources ==
- Kay, Alex J. (2021). Empire of Destruction: A History of Nazi Mass Killing. Yale University Press. ISBN 978-0-300-26253-7.
