= Keine Kameraden =

1978 German history book on WWII

- Subject: Second World War
- Genre: Non-fiction
- Published: 1978

Keine Kameraden. Die Wehrmacht und die sowjetischen Kriegsgefangenen, 1941–1945 (transl. No Comrades: The Wehrmacht and Soviet Prisoners of War, 1941–1945) is a book by German historian Christian Streit first published in 1978. Streit concluded that of 5.7 million Red Army soldiers taken captive by Nazi Germany, 3.3 million died of "ideologically motivated mishandling"—findings which caused a sensation in Germany when first published. It was the first major study on the topic and has been described as "landmark", a "major breakthrough", and by Mark Edele as "the gold standard against which later accounts have to be judged". In 1980, one reviewer wrote that the book "necessitates revision—more or less—to all previous books on the Russo-German war". The book had a major impact on the historiography of Nazi Germany and particularly the war crimes of the Wehrmacht, and was followed by other books exposing the ideological inclination and criminal behavior of the Wehrmacht.

Streit focuses on the criminal orders issued by the Wehrmacht high command prior to the invasion—calling for cooperation with the death squads of the SS and SD, limiting military justice in the occupied areas, mandating the execution of captured commissars, and ordering soldiers to act ruthlessly against Jews, partisans, and Bolsheviks. He compares and contrasts the logistical effort to feed and house the prisoners taken during the conquest of Western Europe with the lack of planning on how to organize transport, food, and shelter for the millions of Soviet prisoners the Wehrmacht expected to take. Streit attributes the massive death rate from starvation, exhaustion, exposure, and disease in 1941 to intentional neglect and argues that the treatment improved in 1942 but only for pragmatic reasons; the labor of the prisoners was needed.

It originated as a doctoral dissertation at Heidelberg University in 1977, was first published in 1978, and has gone through several editions since then. As of 1994, it has not been released in English translation.
