= Alex J. Kay =

British historian

Alex J. Kay FRHistS (8 March 1979) is a British historian who specialises in Nazi Germany. He is best known for his publications on the Hunger Plan and the genocide of Soviet Jewry.

== Education and career ==
Kay was born in Kingston upon Hull, England. He obtained his PhD in 2005 from the Humboldt University, Berlin, in Modern and Contemporary History with the thesis Neuordnung and Hungerpolitik: The Development and Compatibility of Political and Economic Planning within the Nazi Hierarchy for the Occupation of the Soviet Union, July 1940 – July 1941. In 2006 he was awarded the first George L. Mosse Prize of the prestigious scholarly journal Journal of Contemporary History for his article Germany’s Staatssekretäre, Mass Starvation and the Meeting of 2 May 1941, which is based on an aspect of his doctoral thesis. He was contributing co-editor of the collection of essays Nazi Policy on the Eastern Front, 1941: Total War, Genocide, and Radicalization, which was described in the English Historical Review as "a major work of scholarship".

Kay carried out academic research and wrote panel texts for the travelling exhibition of the Foundation Memorial to the Murdered Jews of Europe "Was damals Recht war..." – Soldaten und Zivilisten vor Gerichten der Wehrmacht ("What the law was then... – Soldiers and civilians before courts of the Wehrmacht), which was opened in June 2007 in Berlin. He planned and organised the travelling exhibition of the Archivberatungsstelle Hessen at the Hessian State Archives in Darmstadt Bestandserhaltung – Schutz des Kulturgutes in den hessischen Kommunalarchiven, which was shown from 15 February to 29 March 2011 in Darmstadt's Haus der Geschichte. From 2006 to 2014, he also worked as an independent contractor for the Ludwig Boltzmann Institute for Research on War Consequences. Kay has published articles in several German newspapers, including the national dailies the Frankfurter Allgemeine Zeitung and the Süddeutsche Zeitung, the Berlin daily Der Tagesspiegel and the national weekly der Freitag, editor-in-chief of which is Jakob Augstein.

From July 2014 to December 2016, Kay was the first Senior Academic Coordinator at the Institute of Contemporary History Munich-Berlin leading the project team preparing the English-language version of the 16-volume source edition The Persecution and Murder of the European Jews by Nazi Germany, 1933–1945 (originally published in German). In 2016, he was elected Fellow of the Royal Historical Society. He has taught in the Department of History at the University of Potsdam since 2017.

In 2025, Transactions of the Royal Historical Society retracted an article published by Kay about killings of German prisoners of war by British and Canadian soldiers during World War I. The journal had conducted a plagiarism investigation and concluded that Kay's article followed a 2010 article by Brian Feltman "too closely in argument, content and style, without sufficient acknowledgement/reference". The journal also found that Kay had simultaneously submitted the article to another journal despite declaring otherwise to Transactions. Kay disputed the allegations and argued that the retraction was politically motivated.

=== TV appearances ===
- Expert contributor on all six episodes of the documentary series Adolf Hitler's War, produced by WildBear Entertainment (2020) and aired on UK TV’s Yesterday Channel.
- Expert contributor on all three episodes of the documentary series Living with Hitler, produced by WildBear Entertainment (2020) and aired on UK TV’s Yesterday Channel, the UK’s leading specialist factual channel, on GEO Television in Germany as Hitler-Deutschland – Leben im Dritten Reich and on Histoire TV in France as Vivre avec Hitler.
- Historical consultant and expert contributor on the one-off documentary Ukraine: Holocaust Ground Zero, produced by DoubleBand Films (2023) and aired in September 2023 on Channel 4.
- Expert contributor on the one-off documentary 24 HRS: The Fall of Nazi Germany, produced by Like A Shot (2025) and aired in May 2025 on Channel 4.
- Senior historical consultant and co-lead investigator on the two-part documentary Hitler's DNA: Blueprint of a Dictator, produced by Blink Films UK (2025) and aired in November 2025 on Channel 4, on Sveriges Television in Sweden as Hitlers DNA: En blåkopia av en diktator, on Viasat History in Bulgaria, Croatia, Czech Republic, Hungary, Poland, Romania, Serbia, Slovakia and Slovenia, and on RTL+ Premium / GEO Television in Germany as Hitlers DNA - Das letzte Geheimnis des Diktators.
- Member of the Advisory Board on the feature documentary The Loom, a German/American co-production (2026).

== Publications ==
=== Books ===
- Exploitation, Resettlement, Mass Murder: Political and Economic Planning for German Occupation Policy in the Soviet Union, 1940–1941. Series: Studies on War and Genocide, Vol. 10, Berghahn Books, New York/Oxford 2006 [= Berlin, Humboldt Uni., PhD thesis, 2005 under the title Neuordnung and Hungerpolitik] (paperback edition 2011). ISBN 1-84545-186-4.
- Nazi Policy on the Eastern Front, 1941: Total War, Genocide, and Radicalization. (Co-editor with Jeff Rutherford and David Stahel) With a foreword by Christian Streit. Series: Rochester Studies in East and Central Europe, Vol. 9, University of Rochester Press, Rochester, NY 2012 (paperback edition 2014). ISBN 978-1-58046-407-9.
- The Making of an SS Killer: The Life of Colonel Alfred Filbert, 1905–1990. Cambridge University Press, Cambridge 2016 (hardback and paperback editions). ISBN 978-1-10714-634-1.
  - The Making of an SS Killer. Das Leben des Obersturmbannführers Alfred Filbert 1905-1990. Ferdinand Schöningh, Paderborn 2017. ISBN 978-3-506-78693-7.
- Mass Violence in Nazi-Occupied Europe. (Co-editor with David Stahel) Indiana University Press, Bloomington, IN 2018 (hardback and paperback editions). ISBN 978-0-253-03680-3.
- Empire of Destruction: A History of Nazi Mass Killing (2021)

=== Peer-reviewed articles and book chapters (selection) ===
- Germany’s Staatssekretäre, Mass Starvation and the Meeting of 2 May 1941. In: Journal of Contemporary History. Vol. 41, 2006, No. 4, pp. 685–700 (awarded the George L. Mosse Prize 2006).
- Revisiting the Meeting of the Staatssekretäre on 2 May 1941: A Response to Klaus Jochen Arnold and Gert C. Lübbers. In: Journal of Contemporary History. Vol. 43, 2008, No. 1, pp. 93–104.
- "Hierbei werden zweifellos zig Millionen Menschen verhungern." Die deutsche Wirtschaftsplanung für die besetzte Sowjetunion und ihre Umsetzung 1941–1944. In: Transit: Europäische Revue. No. 38, 2009, pp. 57–77.
- Verhungernlassen als Massenmordstrategie. Das Treffen der deutschen Staatssekretäre am 2. Mai 1941. In: Zeitschrift für Weltgeschichte. Vol. 11, 2010, No. 1, pp. 81–105.
- A "War in a Region beyond State Control"? The German-Soviet War, 1941–1944. In: War in History. Vol. 18, 2011, No. 1, pp. 109–122.
- "The Purpose of the Russian Campaign Is the Decimation of the Slavic Population by Thirty Million": The Radicalization of German Food Policy in Early 1941. In: Alex J. Kay et al. (eds.), Nazi Policy on the Eastern Front, 1941: Total War, Genocide, and Radicalization. University of Rochester Press, Rochester, NY 2012, pp. 101–129.
- Death Threat in the Reichstag, June 13, 1929: Nazi Parliamentary Practice and the Fate of Ernst Heilmann. In: German Studies Review. Vol. 35, 2012, No. 1, pp. 19–32.
- Transition to Genocide, July 1941: Einsatzkommando 9 and the Annihilation of Soviet Jewry. In: Holocaust and Genocide Studies. Vol. 27, 2013, No. 3, pp. 411–442.
- German Economic Plans for the Occupied Soviet Union and their Implementation, 1941–1944. In: Timothy Snyder and Ray Brandon (eds.), Stalin and Europe: Imitation and Domination, 1928–1953. Oxford University Press, New York 2014, pp. 163–189.
  - Niemieckie Plany Gospodarcze dla Okupowanych Terenów Związku Sowieckiego i ich Realizacja, 1941–1944. In: Timothy Snyder and Ray Brandon (eds.), Stalin i Europa, 1928–1953, trans. Sławomir Kędzierski. Wydawnictwo Poznańskie, Poznań 2014, ISBN 978-83-7177-934-3.
- Dr. Hanns Martin Schleyer: "Ich bin alter Nationalsozialist und SS-Führer". In: Wolfgang Proske (ed.), Täter Helfer Trittbrettfahrer, Band 6: NS-Belastete aus Südbaden. 2nd revised edition. Kugelberg Verlag, Gerstetten 2017, ISBN 978-3-945-89306-7, pp. 301–311.
- Speaking the Unspeakable: The Portrayal of the Wannsee Conference in the Film Conspiracy. In: Holocaust Studies. Vol. 27, 2021, No. 2, pp. 187–200. First published online Open Access, 9 August 2019.
- Crimes of the Wehrmacht: A Re-evaluation. In: Journal of Perpetrator Research. Vol. 3, 2020, No. 1, pp. 95–127.
