= Edward B. Westermann =

Professor

Edward B. Westermann is a regents professor of history at Texas A&M University–San Antonio.

== Works ==
- Westermann, Edward B. (2000). Defending Hitler's Reich: German Ground-Based Air Defenses, 1914-1945 (PhD thesis). Storming Media. ISBN 978-1-4235-3664-2. DTIC ADA380153.
- Westermann, Edward B. (2001). Flak: German Anti-aircraft Defenses, 1914-1945. University Press of Kansas. ISBN 978-0-7006-1136-2.
- Westermann, Edward B. (2005). Hitler's Police Battalions: Enforcing Racial War in the East. University Press of Kansas. ISBN 978-0-7006-1371-7.
- Westermann, Edward B. (2016). Hitler's Ostkrieg and the Indian Wars: Comparing Genocide and Conquest. University of Oklahoma Press. ISBN 978-0-8061-5713-9.
- Westermann, Edward B. (2021). Drunk on Genocide: Alcohol and Mass Murder in Nazi Germany. Cornell University Press. ISBN 978-1-5017-5420-3.
