= Mark Edele =

Australian historian

Mark Edele is a historian who studies the Soviet Union. He is the inaugural Hansen Professor at the University of Melbourne. According to Karel C. Berkhoff, Edele is "a highly regarded specialist of the Soviet Union during World War II".

== Works ==
- Edele, Mark (2008). Soviet Veterans of the Second World War: A Popular Movement in an Authoritarian Society, 1941–1991. Oxford University Press. ISBN 978-0-19-160808-7.
- Edele, Mark (2011). Stalinist Society: 1928–1953. Oxford University Press. ISBN 978-0-19-161367-8.
- Edele, Mark (2017). Stalin's Defectors: How Red Army Soldiers Became Hitler's Collaborators, 1941–1945. Oxford University Press. ISBN 978-0-19-879815-6.
- Edele, Mark (2019). The Soviet Union: A Short History. John Wiley & Sons. ISBN 978-1-119-13116-8.
- Edele, Mark (2020). Debates on Stalinism. Manchester University Press. ISBN 978-1-5261-4895-7.
- Edele, Mark (2021). Stalinism at War: The Soviet Union in World War II. Bloomsbury Academic. ISBN 978-1-3501-5351-6.
- Edele, Mark (2023). Russia's War Against Ukraine: The Whole Story. Melbourne University Publishing. ISBN 978-0-5228-7983-4.
