= SD public opinion reports =

The SD public opinion reports, officially Meldungen aus dem Reich ("Reports from the Reich"), were secret reports on public opinion in Nazi Germany prepared by the Security Service (SD) between 1939 and 1944 and distributed to high-ranking Nazi leaders. They are considered one of the most valuable sources on public opinion in Nazi Germany and have been described by historian Randall Bytwerk as "relatively objective as Nazi sources go".
