= Aktion Kugel =

Kugel-Erlass
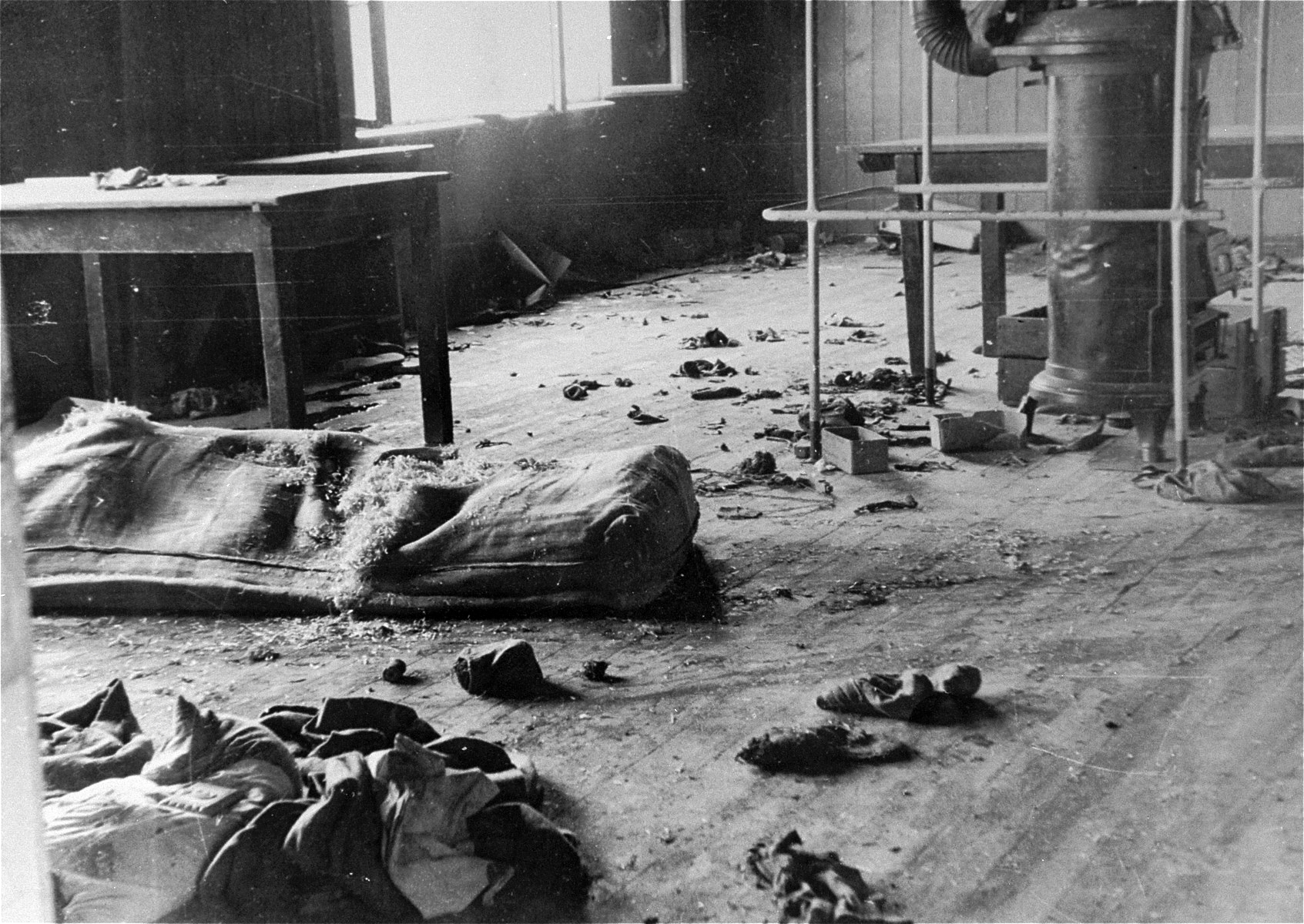
- Block 20 of Mühlviertler subcamp of Mauthausen, where the POWs were left to die
- Date: 2 March 1944–5 May 1945
- Victims: 1,300–5,040

The Kugel-Erlass (English: bullet decree), also known as Aktion Kugel, was a secret decree (Geheimbefehl), issued by Nazi Germany on 2 March 1944. The decree stated that Allied prisoners of war who attempted to escape but were recaptured, especially officers and senior non-commissioned officers, should be handed over to the Sicherheitsdienst (SD) who should execute them, "im Rahmen der Aktion Kugel" (transl. as part of Aktion Kugel), in Mauthausen-Gusen concentration camp. This order was in direct contravention of the provisions of the Third Geneva Convention.

An exception was made for British and American prisoners of war who unsuccessfully attempted to escape. Their fate was to be decided by the German High Command (Oberkommando der Wehrmacht) on a case-by-case basis. The bullet decree was later amended to include British prisoners of war after the Great Escape from Stalag Luft III of 25 March 1944. The number of escaped prisoners of war executed by the Kugel-Erlass is not precisely known; estimates vary between 1,300 and 5,000 or 5,040 executed. The vast majority of these prisoners of war came from the USSR. Five escaped Dutch officers are known, and four more are suspected, to have been executed in Mauthausen as a result of the Kugel-Erlass.

Abraham Edelheit attributes this order to head of Gestapo, Heinrich Müller, but with a date of November 1944.

== See also ==
- Adolf Hitler's directives
- Commando Order
- Commissar Order
- German High Command orders for Treatment of Soviet Prisoners of War
- Le Paradis massacre
- Oflag
- Gleiwitz incident, 1939
- Operation Greif, 1944
- Severity Order
