= Adolf Hitler's directives =

Adolf Hitler's directives, or Führer directives (German: Führerbefehle), were instructions and strategic plans issued by Adolf Hitler himself over the course of World War II. The directives covered a wide range of subjects, from detailed direction of the Armed Forces' operations during World War II, to the governance of occupied territories and their populations. In addition to being a reflection of his personality and strategic interests, they were also a reflection of the larger philosophy of the Nazi regime.

The directives were absolutely binding and were to be followed to the letter without question. The directives also superseded all other laws in the country, including the Constitution. However, they should not be confused with the Führer's Orders that Hitler began to issue later in the war, which were more precise and low-level, could be written or oral and were as binding as the more general directives.

Many of them are direct evidence of the commission of war crimes such as the notorious Commando Order. Other orders provide evidence of crimes against humanity, such as the Hitler order establishing forced euthanasia of disabled people in 1939 under Aktion T4, and the Nacht und Nebel order for eliminating civilian resisters in occupied countries.

== History ==
The failure of the Nazis' attempted coup in 1923 made the Nazis realise that force alone was not always the best way for seizing and consolidating state power. Their failure taught the Nazis that mass participation was necessary for them to seize power and build their Volksgemeinschaft. This participation required a legal basis to ensure that the public cooperated with the Nazis as a civic duty.

Hitler and the Nazis put this lesson into practice as soon as he became Chancellor. First, he successfully convinced President Paul von Hindenburg to sign the Reichstag Fire Decree after the Reichstag fire incident in late February 1933, which essentially suspended the Constitution and most civil liberties in the country, giving the Nazis free rein to eliminate their political opponents. In March 1933, Hitler had the Reichstag pass the Enabling Act, granting the Chancellor sole power to issue laws or decrees without the approval of the Reichstag and thereby essentially ending representative democracy in Germany. Hitler's new lawmaking power meant that the Nazis could now freely transform their political and ideological goals into national policy without worry of hindrance from the legislature or constitutional statute. Upon President Hindenburg's death in 1934, Hitler used Enabling Act powers to merge the offices of the President and Chancellor into one office, that of the "Führer and Reich Chancellor" (Führer und Reichskanzler).

Realizing early on the importance of having a firm grip on the military, Hitler used his now unlimited power to secure operational control over the armed forces, particularly during the course of the war. He achieved this through the directives and orders, ensuring that he was always in direct control of the military's operations without opposition. Hitler's impulsive leadership and strategic ineptitude as commander-in-chief of the Wehrmacht would be blamed for costing Germany grievous defeats later in the war, as would the resolute failure of the German high command to rein in his increasingly erratic and delusional decision-making for fear of being seen as disloyal to the Führer.

== Directive of 21 October 1938 ==
On 21 October 1938, Hitler issued a new directive to the Wehrmacht to prepare for the "following eventualities":

- Securing the borders of the Reich and protection against surprise air attacks
- Liquidation of the remainder of the Czech state. It must be possible to smash at any time the remainder of the Czech state should it pursue an anti-German policy.
- The occupation of Memelland.

== Aktion T4 ==
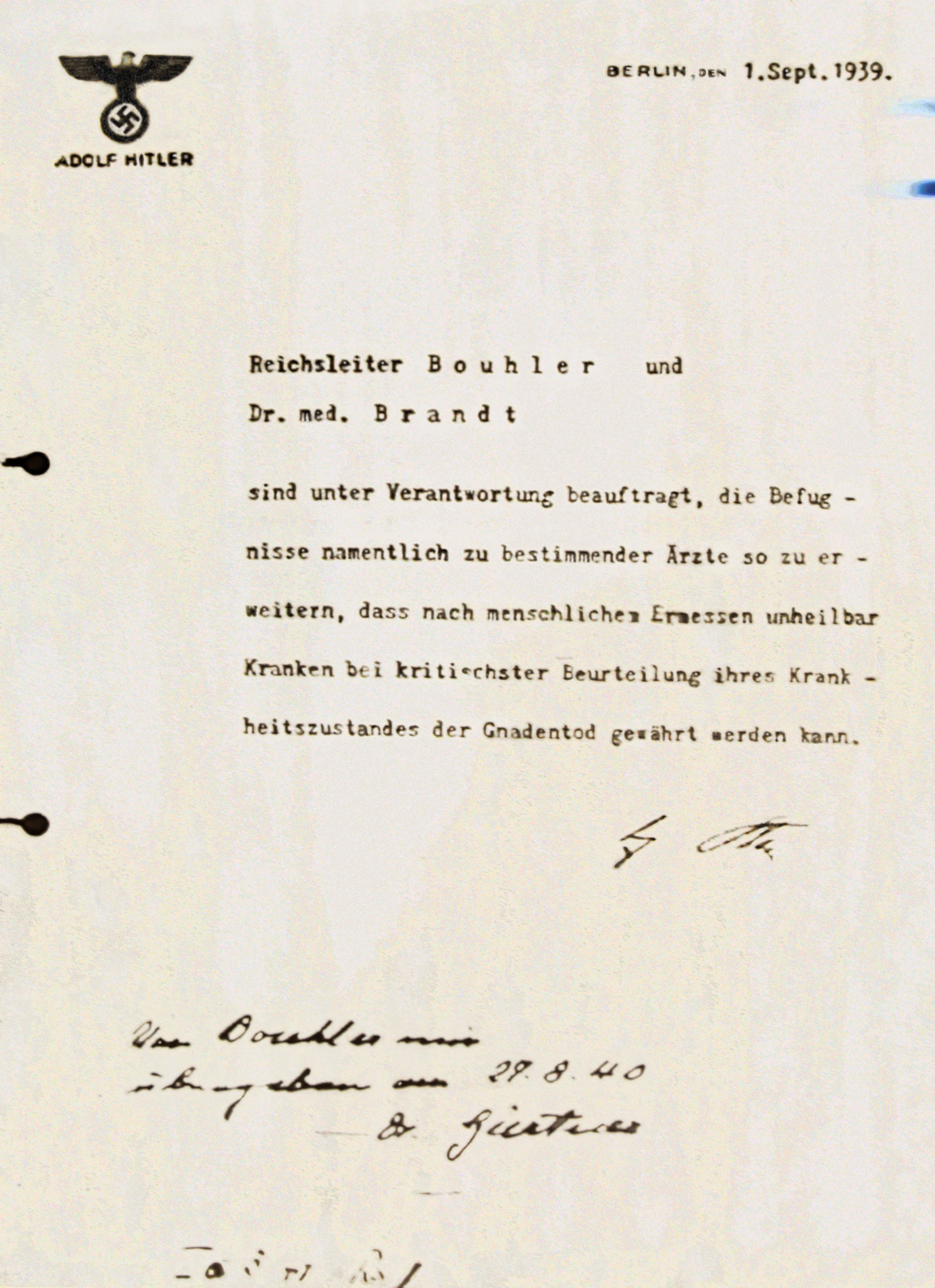
Hitler's order for Aktion T4

In 1939 Hitler issued an order which became the justification for killing disabled children and adults in Aktion T4. It laid the basis for the Holocaust since gassing was a favoured method of murdering many victims. The SS staff who operated the gas chambers were later employed at Auschwitz and many other concentration camps and death camps.

== Fall Weiss directive ==
On 3 April 1939, the directive for Fall Weiss (Case White) was ready. It was issued on 11 April.

The first section, written by Hitler, began:

German relations with Poland continue to be based on the principles of avoiding any disturbances. Should Poland, however, change her policy towards Germany, a final settlement might become necessary in spite of the Treaty in force with Poland. The aim then will be to destroy Polish military strength, and create in the East a situation which satisfies the requirements of National Defence. The free state of Danzig will be proclaimed a part of Reich territory by the outbreak of hostilities at the latest. The political leaders consider it their task in this case to isolate Poland if possible, that is to say, to limit the war to Poland only.

The Wehrmacht had to be ready to carry out Fall Weiss at any time after 1 September 1939.

== Commissar Order, June 1941 ==
The notorious Commissar Order (Kommissarbefehl), dated 6 June 1941, followed directly on the Barbarossa decree. It was called Instructions on the Treatment of Political Commissars and began:

In the struggle against Bolshevism, we must not assume that the enemy's conduct will be based on principles of humanity or of international law. In particular, hate-inspired, cruel and inhumane treatment of prisoners can be expected on the part of all grades of political commissars, who are the real leaders of resistance... To show consideration to these elements during this struggle, or to act in accordance with international rules of war, is wrong and endangers both our own security and the rapid pacification of conquered territory... Political commissars have initiated barbaric, Asiatic methods of warfare. Consequently, they will be dealt with immediately and with maximum severity. As a matter of principle, they will be shot at once, whether captured during operations or otherwise showing resistance.

== Nacht und Nebel, 7 December 1941 ==
Nacht und Nebel (Night and Fog) was a directive (German: Erlass) issued by Hitler on 7 December 1941 for the arrest and secret incarceration of all political activists, resistance supporters, and "anyone endangering German security" (die deutsche Sicherheit gefährden) throughout Nazi Germany's occupied territories. In February 1942, two months later, chief of the Armed Forces High Command, Field Marshal Wilhelm Keitel extended it to all persons in occupied countries who had been taken into custody and were still alive eight days later.

The name referred to a magic spell involving the "Tarnhelm" (stealth helmet) from Richard Wagner's Rheingold, which could make its wearer invisible and instantly transport him far away. The decree was meant to intimidate local populations by denying friends and families of the missing any knowledge of their whereabouts or their fate. The prisoners were secretly transported to German concentration camps, apparently vanishing without a trace.

== Führer Directive No. 46 ==
Führer Directive No. 46 was issued on 18 August 1942 under the title Instructions For Intensified Action Against Banditry [Bandenbekämpfung] In The East, marking the radicalisation of so-called anti-partisan warfare. The directive called on the security forces to act with "utter brutality" to achieve "complete extermination" of "gangs", while providing immunity from prosecution for any acts committed during "bandit-fighting" operations.

The directive designated the SS as the organisation responsible for rear-area warfare in areas under civilian administration. In areas under military jurisdiction (the Army Group Rear Areas), the Army High Command had the overall responsibility. The directive declared the entire population of "bandit" (i.e. partisan-controlled) territories as enemy combatants. In practice, this meant that the aims of security warfare was not pacification, but complete destruction and depopulation of "bandit" and "bandit-threatened" territories, turning them into "dead zones" (Tote Zonen).

== Commando Order, October 1942 ==
The Kommandobefehl (Commando Order) was issued by Hitler on 18 October 1942 stating that all Allied commandos encountered by German forces in Europe and Africa should be killed immediately without trial, even in proper uniforms or if they attempted to surrender. Any commando or small group of commandos or a similar unit, agents, and saboteurs not in proper uniforms, who fell into the hands of the German military forces by some means other than direct combat (through the police in occupied territories, for instance) were to be handed over immediately to the Sicherheitsdienst (SD, Security Service). The order, which was issued in secret, made it clear that failure to carry out these orders by any commander or officer would be considered to be an act of negligence punishable under German military law.

== Nero Decree ==
The Nero Decree was a scorched-earth order issued by Hitler on 19 March 1945, ordering the destruction of German infrastructure to prevent their use by Allied forces as they penetrated deep within Germany.

It was officially titled Demolitions on Reich Territory Decree (Befehl betreffend Zerstörungsmaßnahmen im Reichsgebiet) and has subsequently become known as the Nero Decree, after the Roman Emperor Nero, who supposedly engineered the Great Fire of Rome in 64 AD.

It was countermanded by among others such as, Albert Speer, Minister of Armaments and War Production, who wanted to preserve as much of the country's infrastructure as possible following the imminent defeat.

== See also ==
- Führer Directive No. 25
- Führer Directive No. 30
- German war crimes
- Lex Krupp
- Severity Order
- Criminal orders (Nazi Germany)

== Bibliography ==
- Geyer, Michael; Edele, Mike (2009). Geyer, Michael; Fitzpatrick, Sheila (eds.). Beyond Totalitarianism: Stalinism and Nazism compared. Cambridge University Press. ISBN 978-0-521-89796-9.
- Kershaw, Ian Hitler 1936–1945: Nemesis

== External sources ==
- Adolf Hitler and World War II: Operational Orders
- Führer Directive No. 21: Operation Barbarossa
