= Barbarossa decree =

Wehrmacht criminal order of World War II

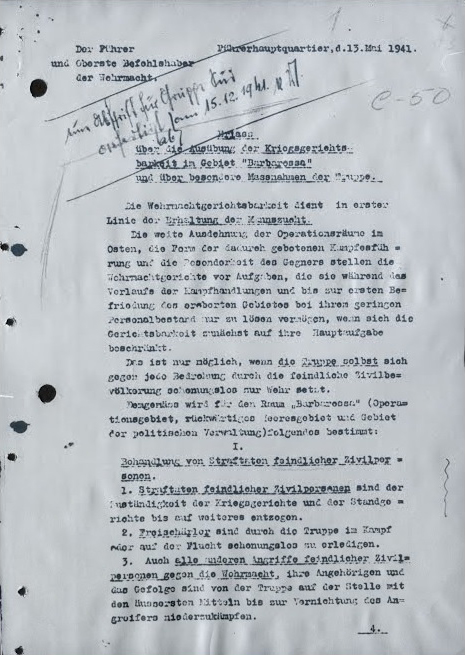
First page of the decree

The Military Justice Decree (German: Kriegsgerichtsbarkeitserlass), commonly known as the Barbarossa decree, was one of the criminal orders of the Wehrmacht issued by Generalfeldmarschall Wilhelm Keitel on 13 May 1941. The decree declared that the upcoming Operation Barbarossa, the invasion of the Soviet Union, would be a war of extermination and endorsed war crimes against Soviet civilians.

The Barbarossa decree was laid out by Adolf Hitler during a high-level meeting with military officials on 30 March 1941, where he declared the political and intellectual elites of the Soviet Union would be eradicated by German forces, in order to ensure a long-lasting German victory. Hitler underlined that executions would not be a matter for military courts, but for the organised action of the military. The decree was issued by Keitel a few weeks before Operation Barbarossa, exempting punishable offences committed by enemy civilians from the jurisdiction of military justice. Suspects were to be brought before a Wehrmacht officer who would decide if they were to be executed or not. Prosecution of offenses against civilians by members of the Wehrmacht was decreed to be "not required" unless necessary for the maintenance of discipline.

== Background ==
In November 1935, the psychological war laboratory of the Reich War Ministry submitted a study about how best to undermine the morale of the Red Army, should a war with the Soviet Union break out. Working closely with the émigré anti-communist Russian Fascist Party based in Harbin, Manchukuo, the German psychological warfare unit created a series of pamphlets written in Russian for distribution in the Soviet Union. Much of it was designed to play on Russian anti-semitism, with one pamphlet calling the "Gentlemen commissars and party functionaries" a group of "mostly filthy Jews". The pamphlet ended with the call for "brother soldiers" of the Red Army to rise up and kill all of the "Jewish commissars". Though this material was not used at the time, later in 1941 the material the psychological war laboratory had developed in 1935 was dusted off, and served as the basis not only for propaganda in the Soviet Union but also for propaganda within the Wehrmacht. German troops were exposed to violent anti-semitic and anti-Slavic indoctrination via movies, radio, lectures, books, and leaflets. The lectures were delivered by "National Socialist Leadership Officers", who were created for that purpose, and by their junior officers. Wehrmacht propaganda portrayed the Soviet enemy in the most dehumanised terms, depicting the Red Army as a force of Slavic Untermenschen ("sub-humans") and "Asiatic" savages engaging in "barbaric Asiatic fighting methods" commanded by evil Jewish commissars to whom German troops were to grant no mercy. Typical of the propaganda was the following passage from a pamphlet issued in June 1941:

Anyone who has ever looked into the face of a Red commissar knows what the Bolsheviks are. There is no need here for theoretical reflections. It would be an insult to animals if one were to call the features of these, largely Jewish, tormentors of people beasts. They are the embodiment of the infernal, of the personified insane hatred of everything that is noble in humanity. In the shape of these commissars we witness the revolt of the subhuman against noble blood. The masses whom they are driving to their deaths with every means of icy terror and lunatic incitement would have brought about an end of all meaningful life, had the incursion not been prevented at the last moment;" [the last statement is a reference to the "preventive war" that Barbarossa was alleged to be].

German army propaganda often gave extracts in newsletters concerning the missions for German troops in the East:

It is necessary to eliminate the red subhumans, along with their Kremlin dictators. The German people have to fulfill the greatest task in their history, and the world will hear that this task will be completed to the end.

As a result of this sort of propaganda, the majority of Heer officers and soldiers tended to regard the war less strategically and more in Nazi terms, seeing their Soviet opponents as nothing but sub-human trash deserving to be trampled upon. One German soldier wrote home to his father on August 4, 1941 that:

The pitiful hordes on the other side are nothing but felons who are driven by alcohol and the [commissars'] threat of pistols at their heads ... They are nothing but a bunch of assholes! ... Having encountered these Bolshevik hordes and having seen how they live has made a lasting impression on me. Everyone, even the last doubter, knows today that the battle against these sub-humans, who've been whipped into a frenzy by the Jews, was not only necessary but came in the nick of time. Our Führer has saved Europe from certain chaos.

As a result of these views, the majority of the German Army worked enthusiastically with the SS and the police in murdering Jews in the Soviet Union. British historian Richard J. Evans wrote that junior officers tended to be especially zealous National Socialists with a third of them being actual Nazi Party members in 1941. The Wehrmacht did not just obey Hitler's criminal orders for Barbarossa because of obedience to him, but also because they truly believed the Nazis' propaganda that the Soviet Union was run by Jews, and that it was necessary for Germany to completely destroy "Judeo-Bolshevism". Jürgen Förster wrote that the majority of Wehrmacht officers sincerely believed that most Red Army commissars were Jews, and that the best way to defeat the Soviet Union was to kill all of the commissars so as to deprive the Russian soldiers of their Jewish leaders.

== Decree ==
The Barbarossa Decree's full title was Erlass über die Ausübung der Kriegsgerichtsbarkeit im Gebiet „Barbarossa“ und über besondere Maßnahmen der Truppe ("Decree on the exercise of military justice in the “Barbarossa” area and on special measures by the troops"), with the formal designation C-50, which was signed on 13 May 1941 by German OKW chief Wilhelm Keitel during the preparation for Operation Barbarossa — Germany's invasion of the Soviet Union. The document concerns the subject of German military conduct in relation to Soviet civilians and Soviet partisans. It instructed German troops to "defend themselves against every threat from the enemy civilian population without mercy". The decree also stipulated that all attacks "by enemy civilians against the Wehrmacht, its members and retinue are to be repelled on the spot by the most extreme measures up to the destruction of the attacker".

On 27 July 1941, Keitel ordered that all copies of the decree be destroyed; however the decree would still retain its official validity.

== Contents ==
The order specified:

- "The partisans are to be ruthlessly eliminated in battle or during attempts to escape", and all attacks by the civilian population against Wehrmacht soldiers are to be "suppressed by the army on the spot by using extreme measures, till [the] annihilation of the attackers;
- Every officer in the German occupation in the East of the future will be entitled to perform execution(s) without trial, without any formalities, on any person suspected of having a hostile attitude towards the Germans", (the same applied to prisoners of war);
- "If you have not managed to identify and punish the perpetrators of anti-German acts, you are allowed to apply the principle of collective responsibility. 'Collective measures' against residents of the area where the attack occurred can then be applied after approval by the battalion commander or higher level of command";
- German soldiers who commit crimes against humanity, the USSR and prisoners of war are to be exempted from criminal responsibility, even if they commit acts punishable according to German law.

The "Guidelines for the Conduct of the Troops in Russia" issued by the OKW on May 19, 1941 declared "Judeo-Bolshevism" to be the most deadly enemy of the German nation, and that "It is against this destructive ideology and its adherents that Germany is waging war". The guidelines went on to demand "ruthless and vigorous measures against Bolshevik inciters, guerrillas, saboteurs, Jews, and the complete elimination of all active and passive resistance." Influenced by the guidelines, in a directive sent out to the troops under his command, General Erich Hoepner of the 4th Panzer Group stated:

The war against Russia is an important chapter in the German nation's struggle for existence. It is the old battle of the Germanic against the Slavic people, of the defence of European culture against Muscovite-Asiatic inundation and of the repulse of Jewish Bolshevism. The objective of this battle must be the demolition of present-day Russia and must therefore be conducted with unprecedented severity. Every military action must be guided in planning and execution by an iron resolution to exterminate the enemy remorselessly and totally. In particular, no adherents of the contemporary Russian Bolshevik system are to be spared.

In the same spirit, General Müller, who was the Wehrmacht's senior liaison officer for legal matters, in a lecture to military judges on June 11, 1941 advised the judges present that "...in the operation to come, feelings of justice must in certain situations give way to military exigencies and then revert to old habits of warfare... One of the two adversaries must be finished off. Adherents of the hostile attitude are not be conserved, but liquidated". Müller declared that, in the war against the Soviet Union, any Soviet civilian who was felt to be hindering the German war effort was to be regarded as a "guerrilla" and shot on the spot. The Army's Chief of Staff, General Franz Halder, declared in a directive that in the event of guerrilla attacks, German troops were to impose "collective measures of force" by massacring villages.

== Reception by the Wehrmacht ==
The order was in line with the interests of the Wehrmacht command, which was eager to secure logistical facilities and routes behind the front line for the divisions on the Eastern Front. On May 24, 1941, Generalfeldmarschall Walther von Brauchitsch, the head of the German Army High Command (Oberkommando des Heeres – OKH), slightly modified the assumptions of the "Barbarossa Jurisdiction." His orders were to use the jurisdiction only in cases where the discipline of the army would not suffer. Contrary to what was claimed after the war, Wehrmacht generals such as Heinz Guderian, did not intend to mitigate the records of the jurisdiction of an order, or in any way violate Hitler's intentions. His command was intended solely to prevent individual excesses which could damage discipline within army ranks, without changing the annihilatory intentions of the order.

As part of the policy of harshness towards Slavic "sub-humans" and to prevent any tendency towards seeing the enemy as human, German troops were ordered to go out of their way to mistreat women and children in the Soviet Union. In October 1941, the commander of the 12th Infantry Division sent out a directive saying "the carrying of information is mostly done by youngsters in the ages of 11–14" and that "as the Russian is more afraid of the truncheon than of weapons, flogging is the most advisable measure for interrogation". The Nazis at the beginning of the war banned sexual relations between Germans and foreign slave workers. In accordance to these new racial laws issued by the Nazis; in November 1941, the commander of the 18th Panzer Division warned his soldiers not to have sex with "sub-human" Russian women, and ordered that any Russian woman found having sex with a German soldier was to be handed over to the SS to be executed at once. A decree ordered on 20 February 1942 declared that sexual intercourse between a German woman and a Russian worker or prisoner of war would result in the latter being punished by the death penalty. During the war, hundreds of Polish and Russian men were found guilty of "race defilement" for their relations with German women and were executed.

== See also ==
- Commissar Order
- Generalplan Ost
- German atrocities committed against Soviet prisoners of war
- Myth of the clean Wehrmacht
- Severity Order
- War crimes of the Wehrmacht
- World War II casualties of the Soviet Union
- Obersalzberg Speech
