= War of annihilation =

Warfare seeking obliteration of a state or group of people

A war of annihilation (German: Vernichtungskrieg) or war of extermination is a type of war in which the goal is the complete annihilation of a state or a people through genocide or through the destruction of their livelihood. This is different from other types of warfare, which feature more limited political goals, such as recognition of a legal status (such as in a war of independence), control of disputed territory (as in war of aggression or defensive war), or the total military defeat of an enemy state.

== Features ==
A war of annihilation is a radical form of warfare in which "all psycho-physical limits" are abolished. Jan Philipp Reemtsma defined it as war, "which is led to, in the worst case, decimate or even destroy a population" The state organization of the enemy is to be destroyed. Another characteristic of a war of annihilation is its ideological character and the rejection of negotiations with the enemy. The legitimacy of the opponent is negated and the opponent is demoted to status of a “total enemy,” with whom there can be no negotiations. “Total victory” of one's own "Volk, Krieg und Politik” (people, war and politics) is the purpose and successful outcome (“triumph”) of a war annihilation.

The canonical example of a war of annihilation is the war on the Eastern Front of World War II fought between Nazi Germany and the Soviet Union.

== Development ==
=== Herero uprising ===
Social Democratic Party of Germany political communications had circulated the term Vernichtungskrieg in order to criticize the action against the insurgents during the Herero Wars.

In January 1904, the Herero and Namaqua genocide began in the German colony German South West Africa. With a total of about 15,000 men under Lieutenant General Lothar von Trotha, this uprising was prostrated until August 1904. Most of the Herero fled to the almost waterless Omaheke, an offshoot of the Kalahari Desert. Von Trotha had them locked down and the refugees chased away from the few water spots there, so that thousands of Herero along with their families and cattle herds died of thirst. The hunted in the desert, let Trotha in the so-called Vernichtungsbefehl, "Annihilation Command":

The Herero are no longer German subjects. ... Within the German border, every Herero is shot with or without a rifle, with or without cattle, I take no more wives and no children, I drive them back to their people or let them be shot. (Note: Die Herero sind nicht mehr Deutsche Untertanen. […] Innerhalb der Deutschen Grenze wird jeder Herero mit oder ohne Gewehr, mit oder ohne Vieh erschossen, ich nehme keine Weiber und keine Kinder mehr auf, treibe sie zu ihrem Volke zurück oder lasse auch auf sie schießen.)

Trotha's warfare aimed at the complete annihilation of the Herero ("I believe that the nation must be destroyed as such") and was supported in particular by Alfred von Schlieffen and Kaiser Wilhelm II. His approach is therefore considered to be the first genocide of the twentieth century. Trotha's action sparked outrage in Germany and abroad; at the instigation of chancellor Bernhard von Bülow, the Emperor lifted the order of annihilation two months after the events in the Omaheke. Trotha's policy remained largely unchanged until its revocation in November 1905.

=== Ludendorff's conception ===
The war of annihilation was a further development of the concept of total war, as the former imperial General Quartermaster Erich Ludendorff had designed. Thereafter, in a coming war, victory must be given unlimited priority over all other societal concerns: all resources would have to be harnessed, the will of the nation had to be made available before the outbreak of the hostilities are unified by propaganda and dictatorial violence, all available weapons would have to be used, and international law would be disregarded. Even in its objectives, total war is unlimited, as the experience of First World War was teaching:

They not only led the armed forces of the states involved in the war, who aspired to annihilate each other; the peoples themselves were put in the service of warfare; the war was also directed against them and pulled them into deepest passion ... Fighting against the enemy forces on huge fronts and wide seas, the struggle against the psyche and life force of the hostile peoples was joined with the purpose of depressing and paralyzing them. (Note: Ihn führten nicht nur die Wehrmächte der am Kriege beteiligten Staaten, die gegenseitig ihre Vernichtung erstrebten, die Völker selbst wurden in den Dienst der Kriegsführung gestellt, der Krieg richtete sich auch gegen sie selbst und zog sie selbst in tiefste Mitleidenschaft […] Zum Kampf gegen die feindlichen Streitkräfte auf gewaltigen Fronten und weiten Meeren gesellte sich das Ringen gegen die Psyche und Lebenskraft der feindlichen Völker zu dem Zweck, sie zu zersetzen und zu lähmen.)

In this conceptual delimitation of the war, Ludendorff was able to draw from the German military-theoretical discourse, which had formed in the confrontation with the People's War, as well as the "Guerre à outrance", which had been invoked by the newly created Third French Republic in the fall and winter of 1870 against the Prussian-German invaders during the Franco-Prussian War.

Ludendorff also dealt with Carl von Clausewitz and his 1832 posthumously published work On War, in which he distinguished between 'absolute' and 'limited' wars. But even for Clausewitz absolute war was subject to restrictions, such as the distinction between combatants and non-combatants, between military and civil or between public and private. Ludendorff claimed now that in total war it is no longer a "petty political purpose", not even "big ... national interests", but the sheer Lebenserhaltung (life-support) of the nation, its identity. This existential threat also justifies the annihilation of the enemy, at least moral, if not physical. Ludendorffs efforts to radicalize the war (for which he was responsible from 1916) met with social, political and military barriers. In the year 1935, his advice was then, as the historian Robert Foley writes, "on fertile ground"; the time seemed ripe for an even more radical delimitation of the war by the Nazis.

=== Nazi warfare ===
The best known example of a Vernichtungskrieg is the Eastern Front of World War II, which began on June 22, 1941, with the German invasion of the Soviet Union. The Free University of Berlin historian Ernst Nolte called this the "most egregious Versklavungs- und Vernichtungskrieg [war of enslavement and annihilation] known to modern history" and distinguished it from a "normal war", such as the Nazi regime conducted against France.

According to Andreas Hillgruber, Hitler had four motives in launching Operation Barbarossa, namely

- The extermination not only of the "Jewish Bolshevik elite" who supposedly governed the Soviet Union since seizing power in the Russian Revolution of 1917, but also the extermination of every single Jewish man, woman and child in the Soviet Union.
- Providing Germany with Lebensraum ("living space") by settling millions of German colonists within what was soon to be the former Soviet Union, something that would have required a massive population displacement as millions of Russian Untermenschen ("sub-humans") would have had to be forced out of homes to make way for the Herrenvolk ("master-race") colonists.
- Turning the Russians and other Slavic peoples not expelled from their homes into slaves who would provide Germany with an ultra-cheap labor force to be exploited.
- Using vast natural resources of the Soviet Union to provide the foundation stone of a German-dominated economic zone in Eurasia that would be immune to blockade, and provide Germany with the sufficient economic strength to allow the Reich to conquer the entire world.

Later, Hillgruber explicitly described the character of the Eastern Front as "intended racial-ideological war of annihilation". Operation Barbarossa has also found its way into the historical-political teaching of general education schools as a historical example of an extermination war.

The concept of the war of annihilation was intensely discussed in the 1990s with reference to the Wehrmachtsausstellung of the Hamburg Institute for Social Research, which carried the word "Vernichtungskrieg" in the title. That Operation Barbarossa would be a war of annihilation, Adolf Hitler had pronounced openly on March 30, 1941, before the generals of the Wehrmacht:

Fight two worldviews against each other. Devastating verdict on Bolshevism is equal to antisocial criminality. Communism immense danger for the future. We have to move away from the position comradeship between soldiers. The communist is not a comrade before and not a comrade afterwards. It is a Fight for annihilation. If we do not take it that way, we will beat the enemy, but in 30 years the Communist enemy will be facing us again. We are not waging war to preserve the enemy. ... Fight against Russia: destruction of Bolshevik commissioners and Communist intelligence. ... The fight will be very different from the fight in the West. In the east, hardness is mild for the future. The leaders must sacrifice their concerns. (Note: Kampf zweier Weltanschauungen gegeneinander. Vernichtendes Urteil über Bolschewismus, ist gleich asoziales Verbrechertum. Kommunismus ungeheure Gefahr für die Zukunft. Wir müssen von dem Standpunkt des soldatischen Kameradentums abrücken. Der Kommunist ist vorher kein Kamerad und nachher kein Kamerad. Es handelt sich um einen Vernichtungskampf. Wenn wir es nicht so auffassen, dann werden wir zwar den Feind schlagen, aber in 30 Jahren wird uns wieder der kommunistische Feind gegenüberstehen. Wir führen nicht Krieg, um den Feind zu konservieren. […] Kampf gegen Rußland: Vernichtung der bolschewistischen Kommissare und der kommunistischen Intelligenz. […] Der Kampf wird sich sehr unterscheiden vom Kampf im Westen. Im Osten ist Härte mild für die Zukunft. Die Führer müssen von sich das Opfer verlangen, ihre Bedenken zu überwinden.)

The orientation of Operation Barbarossa as a prior planned war of annihilation proves the commands prepared according to the general guidelines cited by Adolf Hitler on 30 March 1941 before the start of the campaign, such as the Barbarossa Decree of 13 May 1941, the Guidelines for the Conduct of the Troops in Russia of 19 May 1941 and the Commissar Order of 6 June 1941. The German guidelines for agricultural policy in the Soviet territories to be conquered are one of the most extreme examples of a robbery and annihilation strategy. In a meeting of the secretaries of State on May 2, 1941, the Hunger Plan prepared: "This will undoubtedly starve tens of millions of people if we get what we need pried out of the country." (Note: Hierbei werden zweifellos zig Millionen Menschen verhungern, wenn von uns das für uns Notwendige aus dem Lande herausgeholt wird.)

The German historian Jochen Böhler regarded the invasion of Poland as "prelude to the Vernichtungskrieg" against the Soviet Union in 1941.

== Use of the term ==
Hitler commonly used the term "Vernichtung" in his speeches, such as the Hitler's prophecy speech of 30 January 1939. The Nazi state and Wehrmacht are known to have taken this language as a strategic directive in war planning. German revisionist historian Joachim Hoffmann, noted for providing expert testimony for Holocaust deniers, in his book Stalin's Annihilation War (1995) cited a speech by Joseph Stalin on 6 November 1941. As part of a rhetorical practice of genocide deniers, Hoffman alludes to a supposed external attempt to exterminate Germans (by Stalin), but in fact reveals that exterminationist intent was well known outside Germany by 1941: Stalin said: "Well, if the Germans want a Vernichtungskrieg, they will get it (stormy, prolonged applause). From now on, it will be our task to be the task of all the peoples of the Soviet Union, the task of the fighters, the commanders and the political officials of our army and our fleet, to destroy all invading Germans occupying the territory of our homeland to the last man. No mercy to the German occupiers! (Note: Nun wohl, wenn die Deutschen einen Vernichtungskrieg wollen, so werden sie ihn bekommen (stürmischer, lang anhaltender Beifall). Von nun an wird es unsere Aufgabe, die Aufgabe aller Völker der Sowjetunion, die Aufgabe der Kämpfer, der Kommandeure und der politischen Funktionäre unserer Armee und unserer Flotte sein, alle Deutschen, die in das Gebiet unserer Heimat als Okkupanten eingedrungen sind, bis auf den letzten Mann zu vernichten. Keine Gnade den deutschen Okkupanten!)" According to later statements by Stalin in the following months, he did not mean a complete annihilation of Germany as his goal of war.

== See also ==
- Conflict continuum
- Debellatio
