= Wilhelm Keitel =

German field marshal and war criminal (1882–1946)

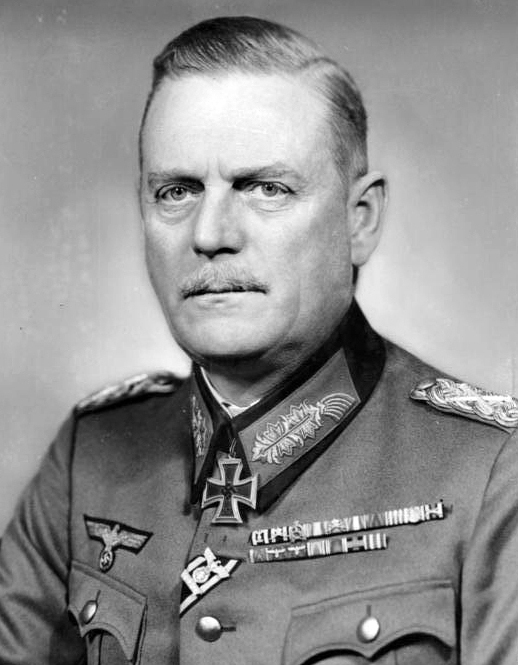
- Keitel in 1942

Chief of the Wehrmacht High Command
- In office 4 February 1938 – 13 May 1945
- Führer: Adolf Hitler
- Preceded by: Werner von Blomberg (as Reich Minister of War)
- Succeeded by: Alfred Jodl

Chief of the Armed Forces Office
- In office 1 October 1935 – 4 February 1938
- Preceded by: Walter von Reichenau
- Succeeded by: Position abolished

Personal details
- Born: Wilhelm Bodewin Johann Gustav Keitel; 22 September 1882 Helmscherode, Germany
- Died: 16 October 1946 (aged 64) Nuremberg, Germany
- Spouse: Lisa Fontaine (m. 1909)
- Relatives: Bodewin Keitel (brother)
- Nickname: "Lakeitel"

Military service
- Allegiance: Germany
- Branch/service: Imperial German Army; Reichsheer; Wehrmacht
- Years of service: 1901–1945
- Rank: Generalfeldmarschall
- Commands: Oberkommando der Wehrmacht
- Battles/wars: World War I; World War II
- Awards: Knight's Cross of the Iron Cross
- Criminal information
- Status: Executed by hanging
- Convictions: Conspiracy to commit crimes against peace Crimes of aggression War crimes Crimes against humanity
- Trial: Nuremberg trials
- Penalty: Death

Wilhelm Bodewin Johann Gustav Keitel (German pronunciation: [ˈvɪlhɛlm ˈkaɪtl̩]; 22 September 1882 – 16 October 1946) was a German field marshal who held office as chief of the Oberkommando der Wehrmacht (OKW), the high command of Nazi Germany's armed forces, during World War II. He signed a number of criminal orders and directives that led to numerous war crimes.

Keitel's rise to the Wehrmacht high command began with his appointment as the head of the Armed Forces Office at the Reich Ministry of War in 1935. Having taken command of the Wehrmacht in 1938, Adolf Hitler replaced the ministry with the OKW and Keitel became its chief. He was reviled among his military colleagues as Hitler's habitual "yes-man".

After the war, Keitel was indicted by the International Military Tribunal in Nuremberg as one of the "major war criminals". He was found guilty on all counts of the indictment: crimes against humanity, crimes against peace, criminal conspiracy, and war crimes. He was sentenced to death and executed in Nuremberg by hanging in 1946.

== Early life and career ==
Wilhelm Keitel was born in the village of Helmscherode near Gandersheim in the Duchy of Brunswick, Germany. He was the eldest son of Carl Keitel, a middle-class landowner, and his wife Apollonia Vissering. As a youngster his main interests were hunting and riding horses, hobbies which he pursued also later in life. He was also interested in farming and wanted to take over his family's estates after completing his education at a gymnasium. This plan failed as his father did not want to retire. Instead, he embarked on a military career in 1901, becoming an officer cadet of the Prussian Army. As a commoner, he did not join the cavalry, but a field artillery regiment in Wolfenbüttel, serving as adjutant from 1908. On 18 April 1909, Keitel married Lisa Fontaine, a wealthy landowner's daughter at Wülfel near Hanover.

Keitel was 1.85 metres (6 feet 1 inch) tall, later described as a solidly built and square-jawed Prussian.

During World War I, Keitel served on the Western Front and took part in the fighting in Flanders, where he was severely wounded. After being promoted to captain, Keitel was posted to the staff of an infantry division in 1915. After the war, Keitel was retained in the newly created Reichswehr of the Weimar Republic and played a part in organizing the paramilitary Freikorps units on the Polish border. In 1924, Keitel was transferred to the Ministry of the Reichswehr in Berlin, serving with the Truppenamt ('Troop Office'), the post-Versailles disguised German General Staff. Three years later, he returned to field command.

Now a lieutenant-colonel, Keitel was again assigned to the war ministry in 1929 and was soon promoted to Head of the Organizational Department ("T-2"), a post he held until Adolf Hitler took power in 1933. Playing a vital role in the German rearmament, he traveled at least once to the Soviet Union to inspect secret Reichswehr training camps. In the autumn of 1932, he suffered a heart attack and double pneumonia. Shortly after his recovery, in October 1933, Keitel was appointed as deputy commander of the 3rd Infantry Division; in 1934, he was given command of the 22nd Infantry Division at Bremen.

== Rise to the Wehrmacht High Command ==
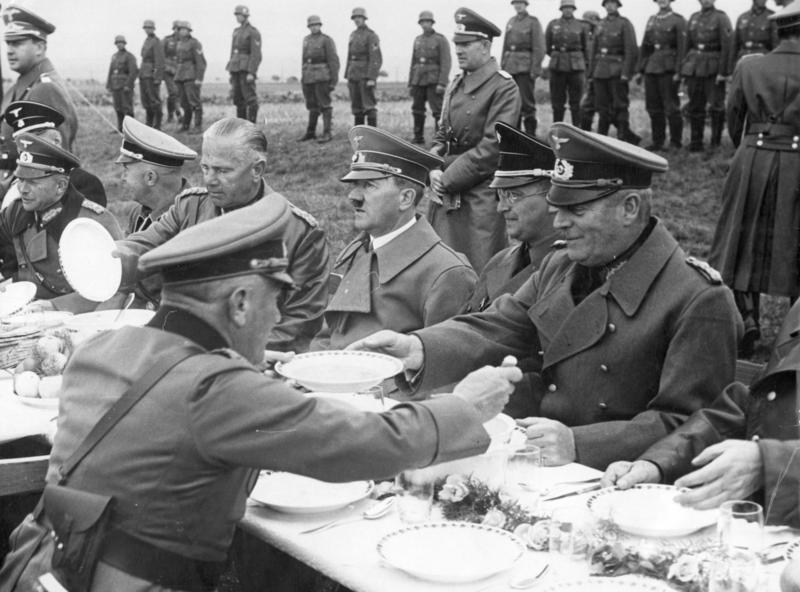
Keitel (seated far right) with Hitler in the Sudetenland in 1938

In 1935, at the recommendation of General Werner von Fritsch, Keitel was promoted to the rank of major general and appointed chief of the Reich Ministry of War's Armed Forces Office (Wehrmachtsamt), which oversaw the army, navy, and air force. After assuming office, Keitel was promoted to lieutenant general on 1 January 1936.

On 21 January 1938, Keitel received evidence revealing that the wife of his superior, War Minister Werner von Blomberg, was a former prostitute. Upon reviewing this information, Keitel suggested that the dossier be forwarded to Hitler's deputy, Hermann Göring, who used it to bring about Blomberg's resignation.

When von Blomberg was asked by Hitler (out of respect for him, after his dismissal in 1938) who he would recommend to replace him, he had said that Hitler himself should take over the job. Upon disclosing that Keitel (who was his son-in-law's father) "is just the man who runs my office", Hitler snapped his fingers and exclaimed "That's exactly the man I'm looking for". So on 4 February 1938 when Hitler became Commander-in-Chief of the Wehrmacht, Keitel (to the astonishment of the General Staff, including himself) became chief of staff. As a result of his appointment, Keitel assumed the responsibilities of Germany's war minister. Although not officially appointed a Reichsminister, Keitel was granted cabinet-level rank.

Soon after his promotion, Keitel convinced Hitler to appoint Walther von Brauchitsch as Commander-in-Chief of the Army, replacing von Fritsch. He also secured the appointment of his brother, Bodewin Keitel, as Chief of the Army Personnel Office. By November 1938, Keitel was promoted to Generaloberst (Colonel General). Later, in April 1939, he was awarded the Golden Party Badge by Hitler.

== Criticism of capabilities ==
Field Marshal Ewald von Kleist labelled Keitel nothing more than a "stupid follower of Hitler" because of his servile "yes man" attitude toward Hitler. His sycophancy was well known in the army, and he acquired the nickname 'Lakeitel', a pun derived from Lakai ("lackey") and his surname. Hermann Göring's description of Keitel as having "a sergeant's mind inside a field marshal's body" was a feeling often expressed by his peers. He had been promoted because of his willingness to function as Hitler's mouthpiece. He was known by his peers as a "blindingly loyal toady" of Hitler, nicknamed "Nickgeselle", after a popular metal toy nodding donkey, the "Nickesel". During the war he was subject to verbal abuse from Hitler, who said to other officers (according to Gerd von Rundstedt) that "you know he has the brains of a movie usher ... (but he was made the highest ranking officer in the Army) ... because the man's as loyal as a dog" (said by Hitler with a sly smile).

Keitel was predisposed to manipulation because of his limited intellect and nervous disposition; Hitler valued his diligence and obedience. On one occasion, Generalleutnant Burkhart Müller-Hillebrand asked who Keitel was: upon finding out he became horrified at his own failure to salute his superior. Franz Halder, however, told him: "Don't worry, it's only Keitel". German officers consistently bypassed him and went directly to Hitler.

== World War II ==
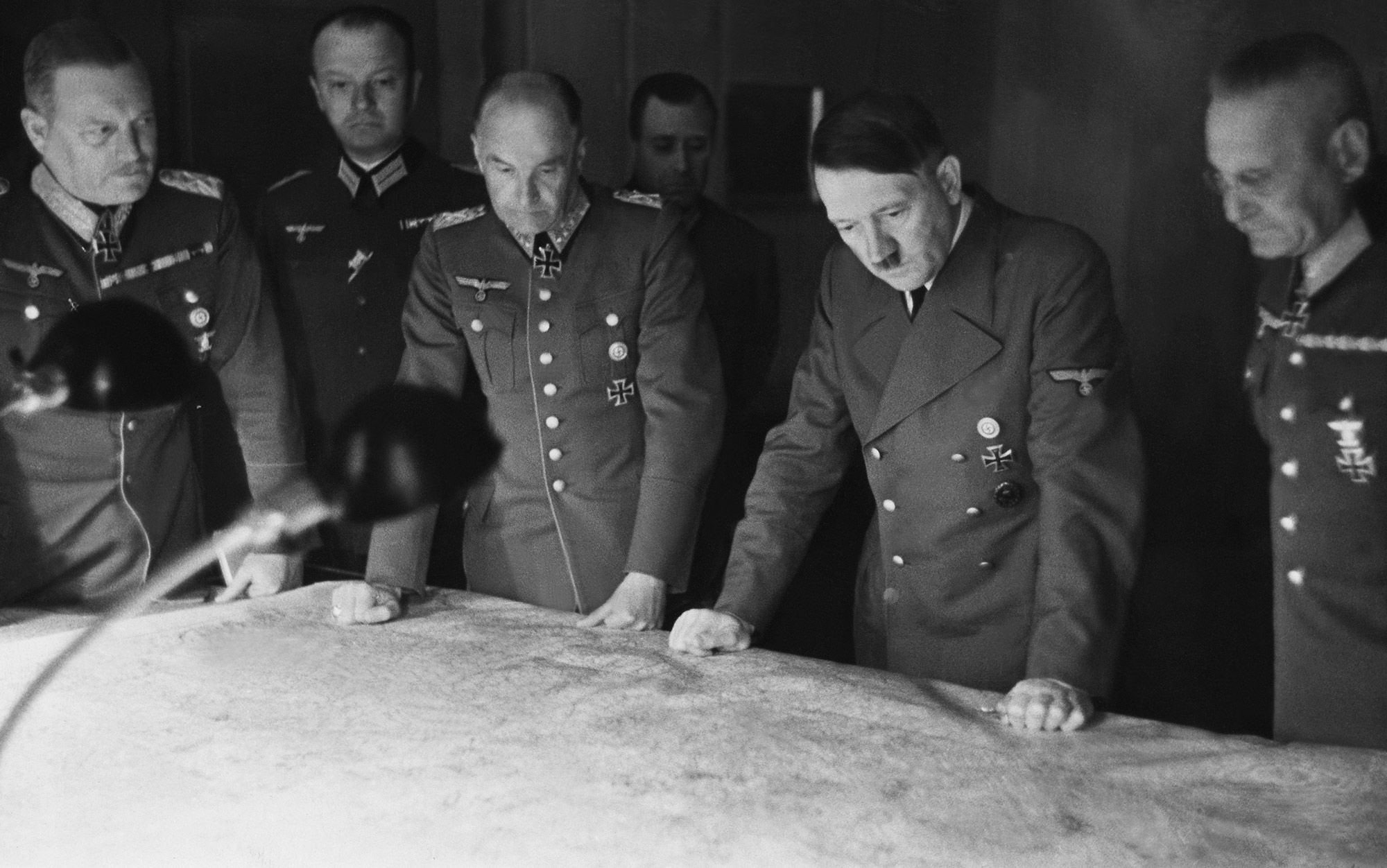
Keitel (far left) and other members of the German high command with Adolf Hitler at a military briefing (c. 1940)

On 30 August 1939 (the next morning the Wehrmacht started the invasion of Poland), Hitler appointed Keitel to the six-person Council of Ministers for the Defense of the Reich which was set up to operate as a "war cabinet". Nazi Germany began the Westfeldzug on 10 May 1940 and defeated France in the Battle of France in mid June. Keitel called Hitler "the greatest warlord of all time" and conducted the negotiations of the French armistice. On 19 July 1940 he and eleven other generals were promoted to Generalfeldmarschall (field marshal).

The planning for Operation Barbarossa, the 1941 invasion of the Soviet Union, was begun tentatively by Halder with the redeployment of the 18th Army into an offensive position against the Soviet Union. On 31 July 1940, Hitler held a major conference that included Keitel, Halder, Alfred Jodl, Erich Raeder, Brauchitsch, and Hans Jeschonnek which further discussed the invasion. The participants did not object to the invasion. Hitler asked for war studies to be completed and Georg Thomas was given the task of completing two studies on economic matters. The first study by Thomas detailed serious problems with fuel and rubber supplies. However, Keitel bluntly dismissed the problems, telling Thomas that Hitler would not want to see it. This influenced Thomas' second study which offered a glowing recommendation for the invasion based upon fabricated economic benefits.

In January 1943, just before the final surrender at Stalingrad, Hitler agreed to the creation of a three-man committee with representatives of the State, the Armed Forces High Command, and the NSDAP in an attempt to centralize control of the war economy and over the home front. The committee members were Keitel, (Chief of OKW) Hans Lammers (Chief of the Reich Chancellery), and Martin Bormann (Chief of the Party Chancellery). The committee, soon known as the Dreierausschuss (Committee of Three), met eleven times between January and August 1943. However, it had little autonomy, with Hitler reserving most of the final decisions to himself. In addition, it ran up against resistance from cabinet ministers, who headed deeply entrenched spheres of influence and, seeing it as a threat to their power, worked together to undermine it. The result was that nothing changed, and the Committee declined into irrelevance.

Keitel signing the ratified surrender terms for the German Army in Berlin, 8 May 1945

Keitel played an important role after the failed 20 July plot in 1944. He sat on the army "court of honour" that handed over many officers who were involved, including Field Marshal Erwin von Witzleben, to Roland Freisler's notorious People's Court. Around 7,000 people were arrested, many of whom were tortured by the Gestapo, and around 5,000 were executed.

In April and May 1945, during the Battle of Berlin, Keitel called for counterattacks to drive back the Soviet forces and relieve Berlin. However, there were insufficient German forces to carry out such counterattacks. After Hitler's suicide on 30 April, Keitel stayed on as a member of the short-lived Flensburg Government under Grand Admiral Karl Dönitz. Upon arriving in Flensburg, Albert Speer, the Minister of Armaments and War Production, said that Keitel grovelled to Dönitz in the same way as he had done to Hitler. On 7 May 1945, Alfred Jodl, on behalf of Dönitz, signed Germany's unconditional surrender on all fronts. Joseph Stalin considered this an affront, so a second signing was arranged at the Berlin suburb of Karlshorst on 8 May. There, Keitel signed the German Instrument of Surrender on 8 May 1945. Five days later on 13 May, he was arrested at the request of the United States and interned at Camp Ashcan in Mondorf-les-Bains. Jodl succeeded him as Chief of OKW until the final dissolution of the Flensburg Government on 23 May.

== Role in crimes of the Wehrmacht and the Holocaust ==
Keitel had full knowledge of the criminal nature of the planning and the subsequent invasion of Poland, agreeing to its aims in principle. The Nazi plans included mass arrests, population transfers, and mass murder. Keitel did not contest the regime's assault upon basic human rights or counter the role of the Einsatzgruppen in the murders. The criminal nature of the invasion was now obvious; local commanders continued to express shock and protest over the events they were witnessing. Keitel continued to ignore the protests among the officer corps while they became morally numbed to the atrocities.

Keitel issued a series of criminal orders from April 1941. The orders went beyond established codes of conduct for the military and broadly allowed the execution of Jews, civilians, and non-combatants for any reason. Those carrying out the murders were exempted from court-martial or later being tried for war crimes. The orders were signed by Keitel; however, other members of the OKW and the OKH, including Halder, wrote or changed the wording of his orders. Commanders in the field interpreted and carried out the orders.

In the summer and autumn of 1941, German military lawyers unsuccessfully argued that Soviet prisoners of war should be treated in accordance with the Geneva Conventions. Keitel rebuffed them, writing: "These doubts correspond to military ideas about wars of chivalry. Our job is to suppress a way of life." In September 1941, concerned that some field commanders on the Eastern Front did not exhibit sufficient harshness in implementing the May 1941 order on the "Guidelines for the Conduct of the Troops in Russia", Keitel issued a new order, writing: "[The] struggle against Bolshevism demands ruthless and energetic action especially also against the Jews, the main carriers of Bolshevism". Also in September, Keitel issued an order to all commanders, not just those in the occupied Soviet Union, instructing them to use "unusual severity" to stamp out resistance. In this context, the guideline stated that execution of 50 to 100 "Communists" was an appropriate response to a loss of a German soldier. Such orders and directives further radicalised the army's occupational policies and enmeshed it in the genocide of the Jews.

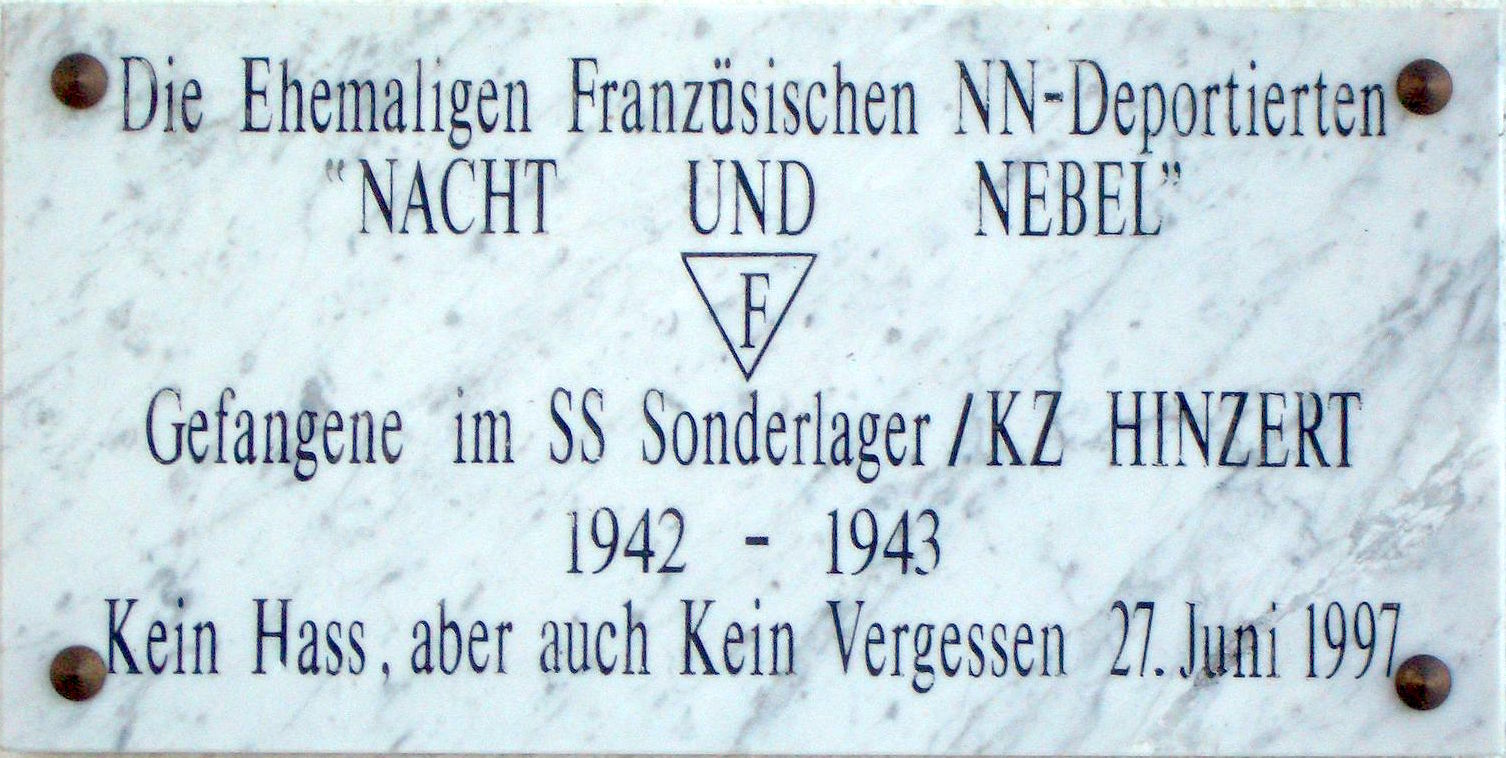
Plaque commemorating French victims at the Hinzert concentration camp, using the expressions "Nacht und Nebel" and "NN-Deported." The inscription translates to: "No hate, but also no forgetting."

In December 1941, Hitler instructed the OKW to subject, with the exception of Denmark, Western Europe (which was under military occupation) to the Night and Fog Decree. Signed by Keitel, the decree made it possible for foreign nationals to be transferred to Germany for trial by special courts, or simply handed to the Gestapo for deportation to concentration camps. The OKW further imposed a blackout on any information concerning the fate of the accused. At the same time, Keitel increased pressure on Otto von Stülpnagel, the military commander in France, for a more ruthless reprisal policy in the country. In October 1942, Keitel signed the Commando Order that authorized the killing of enemy special operations troops even when captured in uniform.

In the spring and summer of 1942, as the deportations of the Jews to extermination camps progressed, the military initially protested when it came to the Jews that laboured for the benefit of the Wehrmacht. The army lost control over the matter when the SS assumed command of all Jewish forced labour in July 1942. Keitel formally endorsed the state of affairs in September, reiterating for the armed forces that "evacuation of the Jews must be carried out thoroughly and its consequences endured, despite any trouble it may cause over the next three or four months".

== Trial, conviction, and execution ==
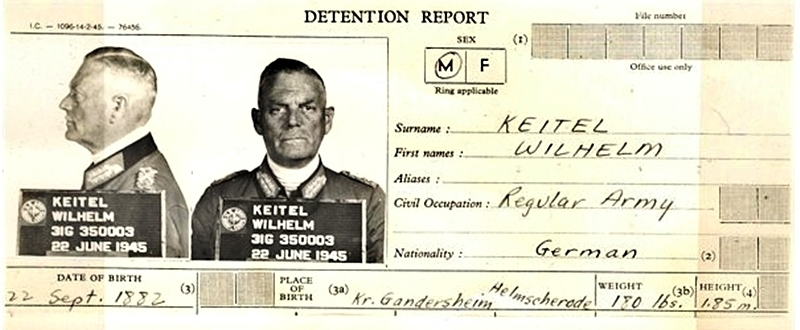
Keitel's detention report from June 1945

17 October 1946 newsreel of the Nuremberg trials sentencing

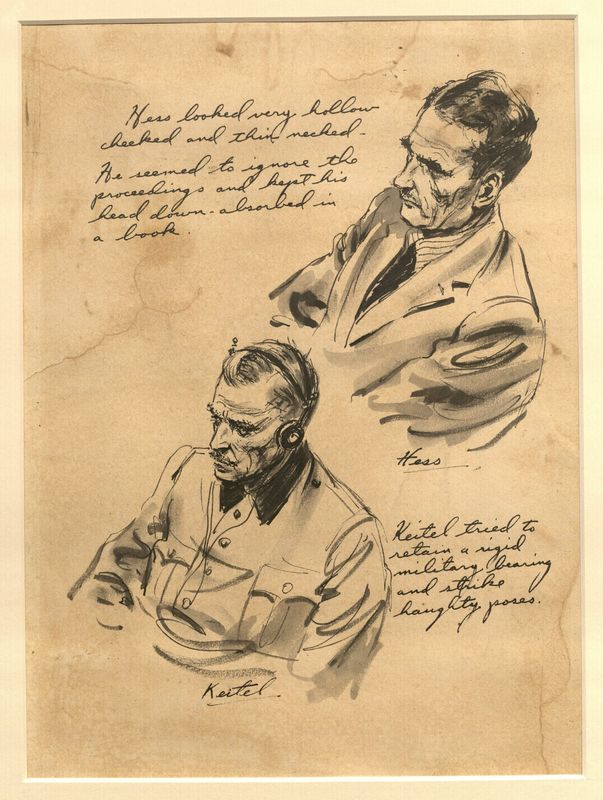
Courtroom sketches by Ed Vebell of Rudolf Hess and Keitel; Vebell notes that Keitel "tried to retain a rigid military bearing and strike haughty poses."

After the war, Keitel faced the International Military Tribunal (IMT), where he was examined by Chief Medical Officer Lt. Col. Rene Juchli who reported that Keitel was suffering from "high blood pressure, varicose veins, and dysentery". He was indicted on all four counts before the IMT: conspiracy to commit crimes against peace, planning, initiating and waging wars of aggression, war crimes, and crimes against humanity. Most of the case against him was based on his signature being present on dozens of orders that called for soldiers and political prisoners to be killed or 'disappeared'. In court, Keitel admitted that he knew many of Hitler's orders were illegal. His defence relied almost entirely on the argument that he was merely following orders in conformity to "the leader principle" (Führerprinzip) and his personal oath of loyalty to Hitler.

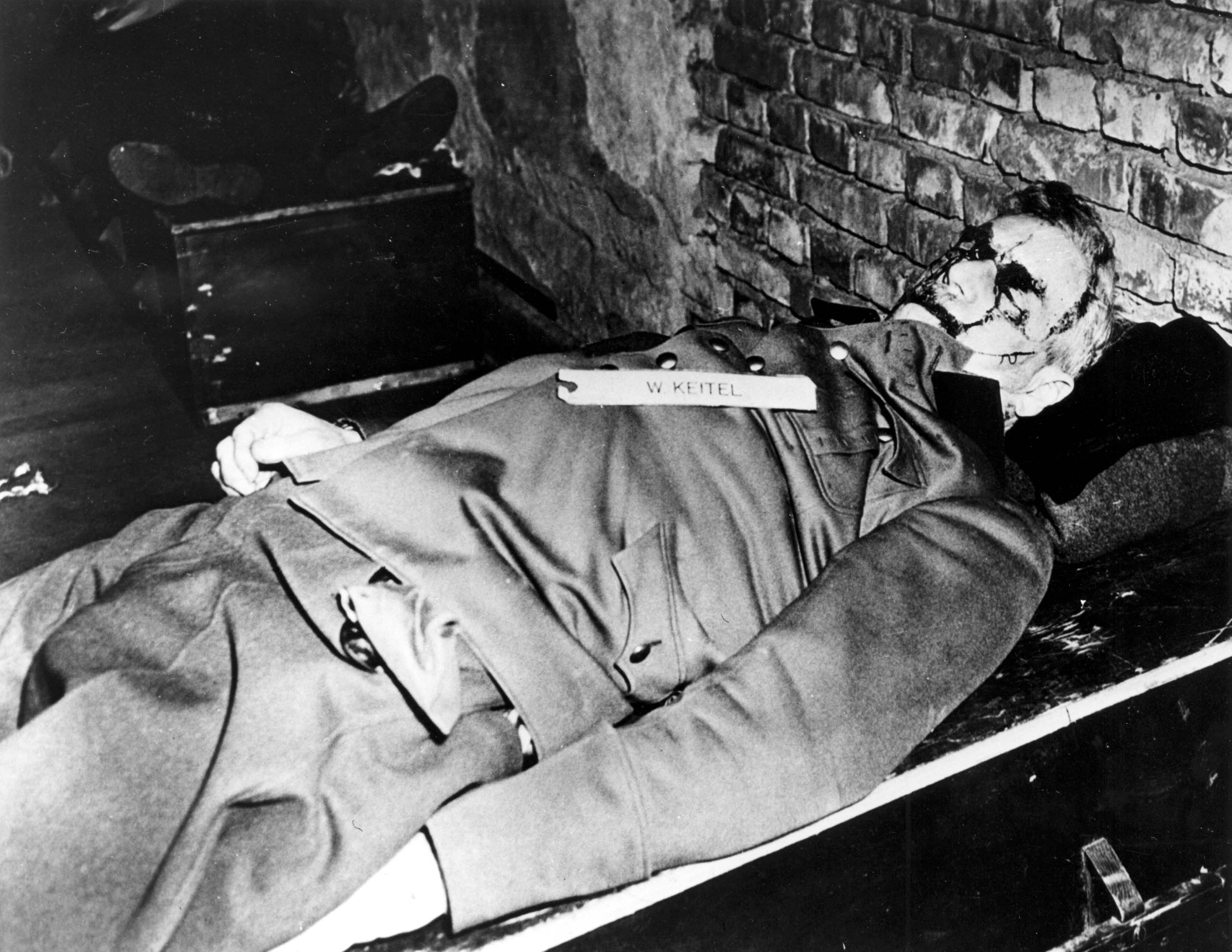
Keitel's body after his execution, showing injuries caused from hitting his head on the trap door

The IMT rejected this defence and convicted him on all charges. Although the tribunal's charter allowed "superior orders" to be considered a mitigating factor, it found Keitel's crimes were so egregious that "there is nothing in mitigation". In its judgment against him, the IMT wrote, "Superior orders, even to a soldier, cannot be considered in mitigation where crimes as shocking and extensive have been committed consciously, ruthlessly and without military excuse or justification." It also noted several instances where he issued illegal orders on his own authority.

In his statement before the Tribunal, Keitel said: "As these atrocities developed, one from the other, step by step, and without any foreknowledge of the consequences, destiny took its tragic course, with its fateful consequences." To underscore the criminal rather than military nature of Keitel's acts, the Allies denied his request to be shot by firing squad. Instead, he was executed at Nuremberg Prison by hanging.

On the day of the execution, Keitel told prison chaplain Henry F. Gerecke "You have helped me more than you know. May Christ, my saviour, stand by me all the way. I shall need him so much." He then received Communion and was executed later that day. Keitel was executed by US Army Master Sergeant John C. Woods. His last words were: "I call on God Almighty to have mercy on the German people. More than two million German soldiers went to their death for the fatherland before me. I follow now my sons – all for Germany." The trap door was small, causing head injuries to Keitel and several other condemned men as they dropped. Many of the executed Nazis fell from the gallows with insufficient force to snap their necks, resulting in convulsions that in Keitel's case lasted 24 minutes. The corpses of Keitel and the other nine executed men were, like Hermann Göring's, cremated at Ostfriedhof (Munich) and the ashes were scattered in the river Isar.

== Works ==
Before his execution, Keitel wrote his memoirs, which were edited by Walter Görlitz and published in Germany by Muster-Schmidt in 1961 as Generalfeldmarschall Keitel – Verbrecher oder Offizier? Erinnerungen, Briefe, Dokumente des Chefs OKW (Field Marshal Keitel – Criminal or Officer? Memoirs, Letters, and Documents of the Chief of the OKW). An English translation was published by Stein and Day as The Memoirs of Field-Marshal Wilhelm Keitel (1966). It was later re-issued as In the Service of the Reich (1979) ISBN 978-0-812-86029-0 and The Memoirs of Field-Marshal Wilhelm Keitel Chief of the German High Command, 1938-1945 (2000) ISBN 978-0-8154-1072-0. Another work by Keitel later published in English was Questionnaire on the Ardennes Offensive. He wrote it with Alfred Jodl.

== Family ==
Keitel was a cousin once-removed of Katherine "Kitty" Oppenheimer, wife of the physicist J. Robert Oppenheimer, the director of the Manhattan Project's Los Alamos Laboratory, where the first atomic bombs were developed.

== Legacy ==
Keitel was frequently depicted in World War II films, such as by Dieter Mann in Downfall (2004). Notably, East German actor Gerd Michael Henneberg repeatedly reprised his role as Keitel in several Soviet-East German co-productions directed by Yuri Ozerov in the 1970s and 1980s, such as Soldiers of Freedom (1977), Battle of Moscow (1985) and Stalingrad (1990). He is also briefly depicted in the movie Valkyrie (2008) as played by Kenneth Cranham.

Political offices
Preceded by Walter von Reichenau	Chief of the Wehrmachtamt; 1 October 1935 – 4 February 1938	Succeeded by None; Office abolished
Military offices
Preceded by Werner von Blomberg as Reichsminister of War	Chief of the Oberkommando der Wehrmacht; 4 February 1938 – 8 May 1945	Succeeded by Alfred Jodl
Preceded by Hans Krebs	Chief of the OKH General Staff; 1 May 1945 – 8 May 1945	Succeeded by Alfred Jodl
