= Severity Order =

Nazi war order

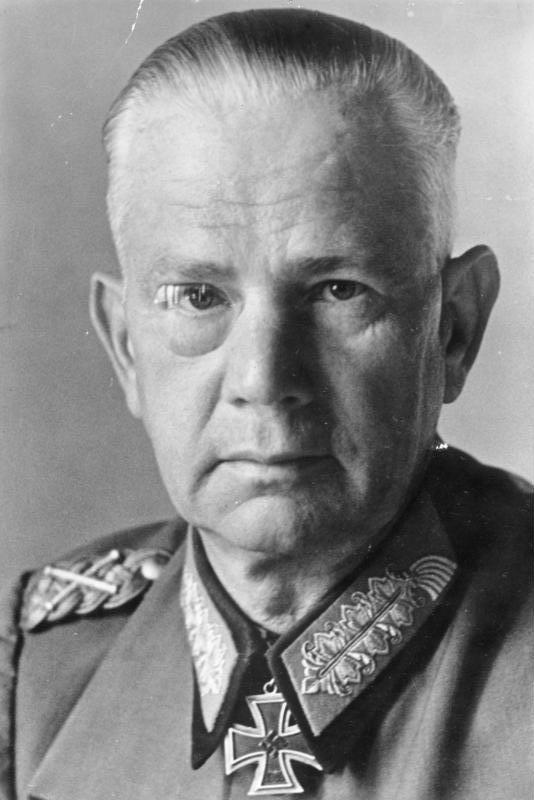
Generalfeldmarschall Walter von Reichenau, 1941

The Severity Order or Reichenau Order was the name given to an order promulgated within the German Sixth Army on the Eastern Front during World War II by Generalfeldmarschall Walter von Reichenau on 10 October 1941.

== Text of the order ==
The order said, in part:

The most important objective of this campaign against the Jewish-Bolshevik system is the complete destruction of its sources of power and the extermination of the Asiatic influence in European civilisation.

[...] In this eastern theatre, the soldier is not only a man fighting in accordance with the rules of the art of war, but also the ruthless standard bearer of a national conception and the avenger of bestialities which have been inflicted upon German and racially related nations. For this reason the soldier must learn fully to appreciate the necessity for the severe but just retribution that must be meted out to the subhuman species of Jewry. It has the further purpose of nipping in the bud uprisings in the Wehrmacht's rear, which experience teaches were always instigated by Jews.
Das wesentlichste Ziel des Feldzuges gegen das jüdisch-bolschewistische System ist die völlige Zerschlagung der Machtmittel und die Ausrottung des asiatischen Einflusses im europäischen Kulturkreis.

[...] Der Soldat ist im Ostraum nicht nur ein Kämpfer nach den Regeln der Kriegskunst, sondern auch Träger einer unerbittlichen völkischen Idee und der Rächer für alle Bestialitäten, die deutschem und artverwandtem Volkstum zugefügt wurden. Deshalb muß der Soldat für die Notwendigkeit der harten, aber gerechten Sühne am jüdischen Untermenschentum volles Verständnis haben. Sie hat den weiteren Zweck, Erhebungen im Rücken der Wehrmacht, die erfahrungsgemäß stets von Juden angezettelt wurden, im Keime zu ersticken.

— Conduct of Troops in Eastern Territories

== Implications of the order ==
The order paved the way for mass murder of Jews. All Jews were henceforth to be treated as partisans, and commanders were directed that they be either summarily shot or handed over to the Einsatzgruppen execution squads of the SS-Totenkopfverbände as the situation dictated. Other dispositions complain about feeding civilians and POWs, which is described as an "equally misunderstood humanitarian act"; indeed, the taking of partisans and women as POWs is criticised. Finally, the civilian population was to be disarmed and buildings which had been set on fire by Soviet destruction battalions were to be saved only when useful to the German Army.

== History of the order ==
=== Upon enactment ===
According to Arno J. Mayer, upon hearing of the Severity Order, Reichenau's superior Field Marshal Gerd von Rundstedt expressed "complete agreement" with it, and sent out a circular to all of the army generals under his command urging them to send out their own versions of the Severity Order, which would impress upon the troops the need to exterminate Jews. Mayer provides no primary citation for a physical document to back his specific claim.

According to Wilhelm Adam, when Reichenau died and General Friedrich Paulus assumed command of the Sixth Army, both the Severity Order and Adolf Hitler's Commissar Order were rescinded in his command sector.

=== After the war ===
During the Nuremberg trials, Rundstedt denied any knowledge of that order before his capture by the Allies, although he acknowledged that Reichenau's orders "may have reached my army group and probably got into the office".

== See also ==
=== Internal links ===
- Adolf Hitler's directives
- Barbarossa decree
- Commando Order
- Commissar Order
- Criminal orders (Nazi Germany)
- German war crimes

=== External links ===
- Texts of the order:
  - Original version
  - English version
