= Commando Order =

1942 Nazi order instructing that all Allied commandos be killed immediately

The Commando Order (German: Kommandobefehl) was issued by the OKW, the high command of the German Armed Forces, on 18 October 1942. This order stated that all Allied commandos captured in Europe and Africa should be summarily executed without trial, even if in proper uniforms or if they attempted to surrender. Any commando or small group of commandos or a similar unit, agents, and saboteurs not in proper uniforms who fell into the hands of the German forces by some means other than direct combat (by being apprehended by the police in occupied territories, for instance), were to be handed over immediately to the Sicherheitsdienst (SD, or Security Service) for immediate execution.

According to the OKW, this was to be done in retaliation for their opponents "employing in their conduct of the war, methods which contravene the International Convention of Geneva". The German high command alleged that they had ascertained from "captured orders" that Allied commandos were "instructed not only to tie up prisoners, but also to kill out-of-hand unarmed captives who they think might prove an encumbrance to them, or hinder them in successfully carrying out their aims", and that commandos had been ordered to kill prisoners.

This order, which was issued in secret, made it clear that failure to carry out its directives by any commander or officer would be considered an act of negligence punishable under German military law. It was issued on October 18 by Chief of the OKW Wilhelm Keitel, and only a dozen copies were distributed by Chief of Operations Staff Alfred Jodl the next day, with an appendix stating that it was intended for commanders only, and must not under any circumstances fall into enemy hands. However it was sent as an Ultra message, intercepted, and translated.

It was in fact the second "Commando Order", the first being issued by Generalfeldmarschall Gerd von Rundstedt on 21 July 1942, stipulating that parachutists should be handed over to the Gestapo. However, it has also been suggested that Hitler had issued secret orders that Allied commandos were to be "shot while trying to escape" as early as October 1941.

Shortly after World War II, at the Nuremberg trials, the Commando Order was found to be a direct breach of the laws of war, and German officers who carried out illegal executions under the Commando Order were found guilty of war crimes and sentenced to death, or, in two cases, extended incarceration.

== Background ==
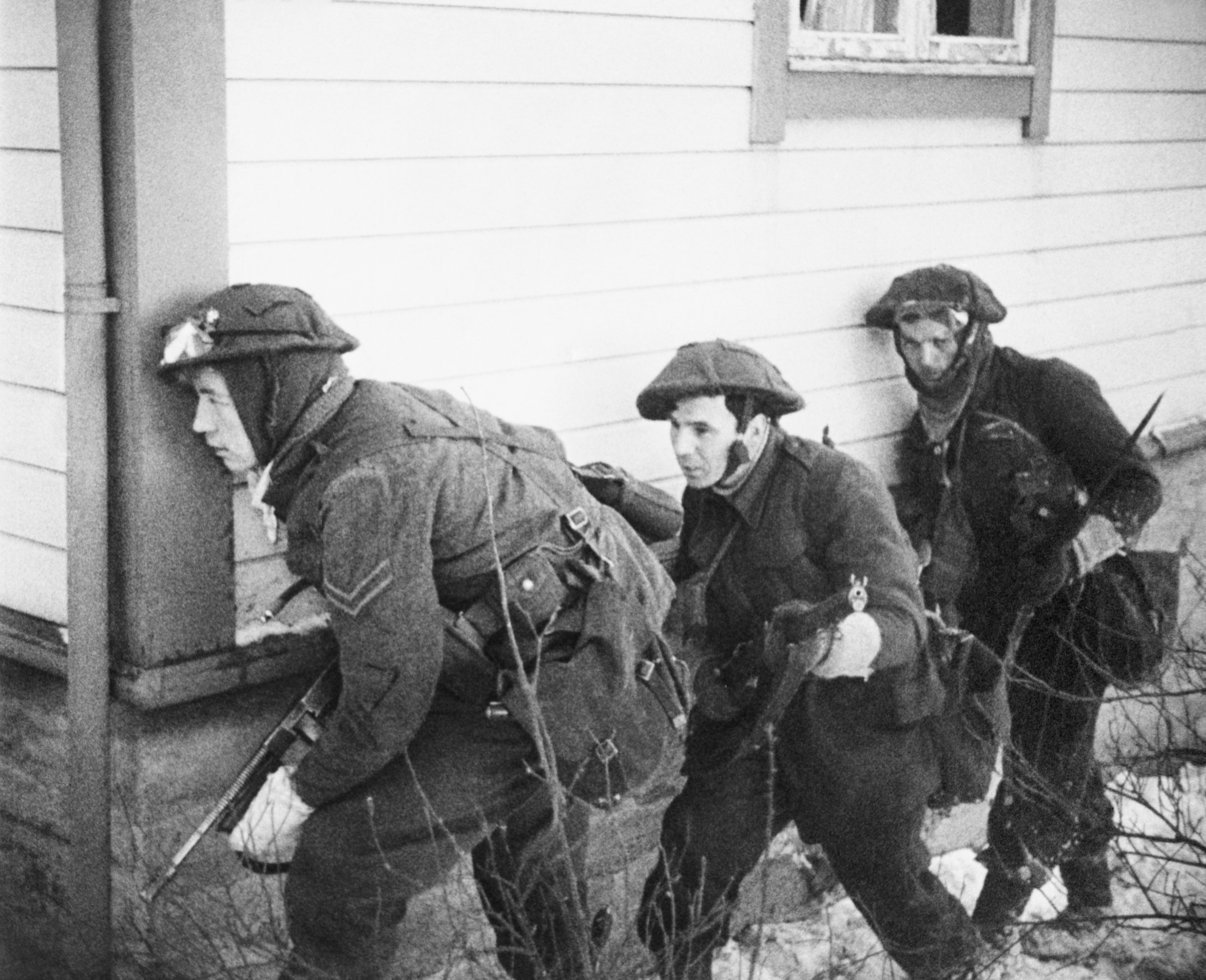
British commandos during Operation Archery on Vågsøy island, Norway, 1941

The Commando Order cited alleged violations of the Geneva Conventions by Allied commandos as justification, following incidents at the recent Dieppe Raid and on a small raid on the Channel Island of Sark by the Small Scale Raiding Force, with some men of No. 12 Commando.

=== Dieppe Raid ===
On 19 August 1942, during a raid on Dieppe, a Canadian brigadier, William Southam, took a copy of the operational order ashore against explicit orders. The order was subsequently discovered on the beach by the Germans and found its way to Adolf Hitler. Among the dozens of pages of orders was an instruction to "bind prisoners". The orders were for Canadian forces participating in the raid, and not the commandos. Bodies of shot German prisoners with their hands tied were allegedly found by German forces after the battle.

=== Sark Raid ===
On the night of 3–4 October 1942, ten men of the Small Scale Raiding Force and No. 12 Commando (attached) made an offensive raid on the German-occupied isle of Sark, called "Operation Basalt", to reconnoitre the island and to take prisoners.

During the raid, five prisoners were captured. To minimise the task of the guard left with the captives, the commandos tied the prisoners' hands behind their backs. According to the commandos, one prisoner started shouting to alert his comrades in a hotel and was shot dead. The remaining four prisoners were silenced by stuffing their mouths, according to Anders Lassen, with grass.

En route to the beach, three prisoners made a break. Whether or not some had freed their hands during the escape has never been established, and it is unknown whether all three broke at the same time. One was shot and another stabbed, while the third managed to escape. The fourth was conveyed safely back to England.

=== German response and escalation ===
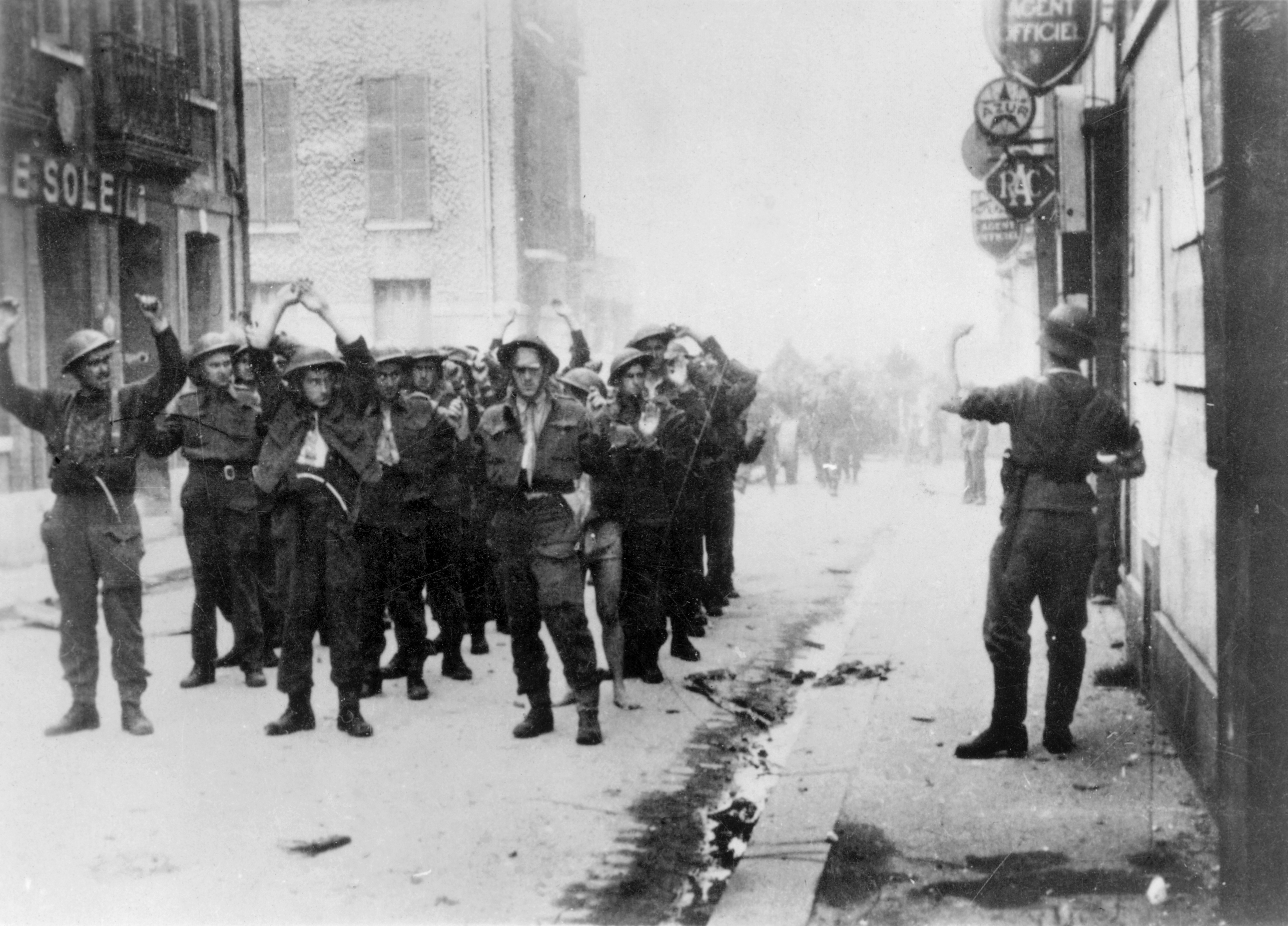
Canadian prisoners being led away through Dieppe after the failed raid

A few days after the Sark raid, the Germans issued a communiqué claiming that at least one prisoner had escaped and two were shot while they were escaping, having had their hands tied. They also claimed the "hand-tying" practise was used at Dieppe. Then, on 9 October Berlin announced that 1,376 Allied prisoners (mainly Canadians from Dieppe) would henceforth be shackled. The Canadians responded with a similar-in-practise shackling of German POWs in Canada.

The tit-for-tat shackling continued until the Swiss achieved agreement with the Canadians to desist on 12 December and with the Germans some time later after they received further assurances from the British. However, before the Canadians ended the policy, there was an uprising of German POWs at Bowmanville POW camp.

On 7 October, Hitler personally penned a note in the Wehrmacht daily communiqué:

In future, all terror and sabotage troops of the British and their accomplices, who do not act like soldiers but rather like bandits, will be treated as such by the German troops and will be ruthlessly eliminated in battle, wherever they appear.

== Text ==
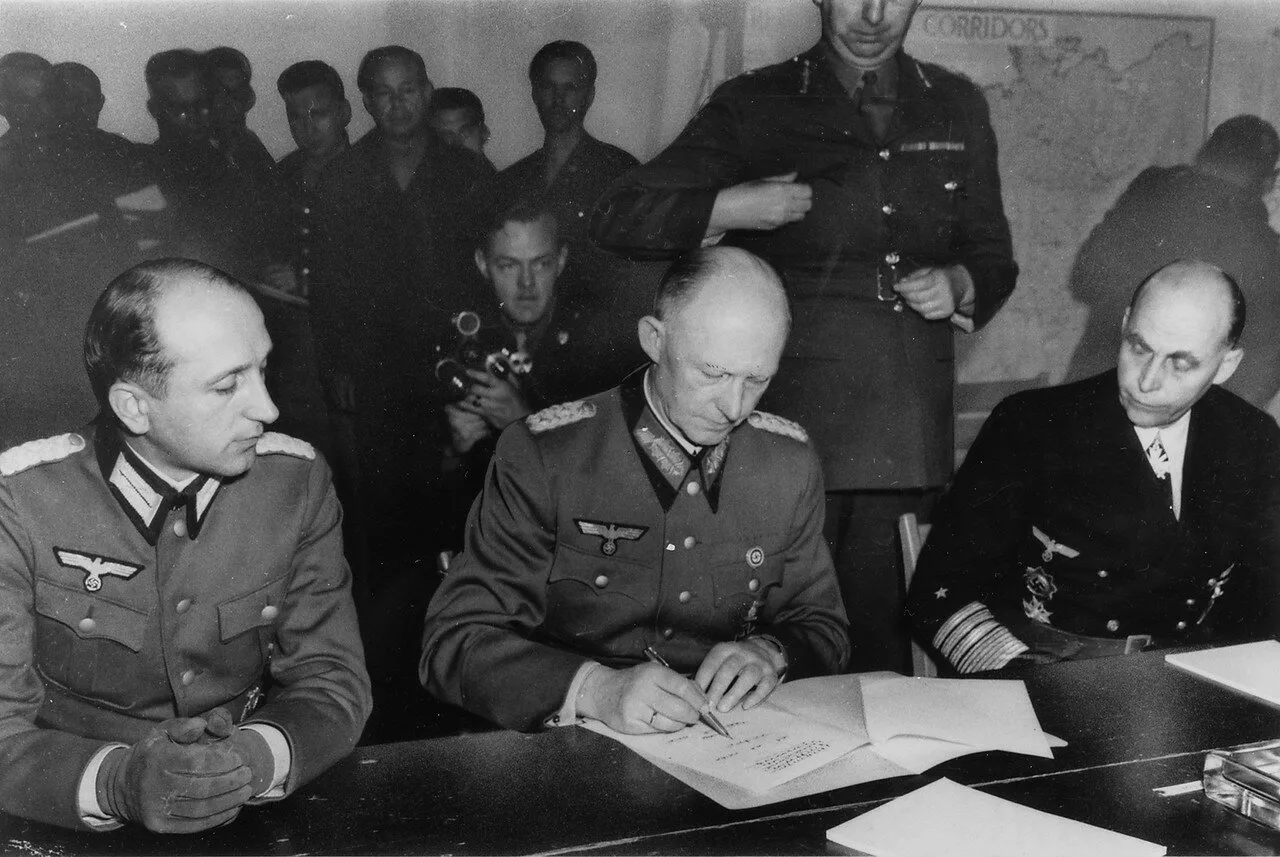
General Alfred Jodl (between Major Wilhelm Oxenius to the left and Generaladmiral Hans-Georg von Friedeburg to the right) signing the German Instrument of Surrender at Reims, France, 7 May 1945

On 18 October, after much deliberation by High Command lawyers, officers, and staff, Hitler issued the Commando Order or Kommandobefehl in secret, with only 12 copies. The following day Alfred Jodl distributed 22 copies with an appendix stating that the order was "intended for commanders only and must not under any circumstances fall into enemy hands". The order itself stated:

1. For a long time now our opponents have been employing in their conduct of the war, methods which contravene the International Convention of Geneva. The members of the so-called Commandos behave in a particularly brutal and underhanded manner; and it has been established that those units recruit criminals not only from their own country but even former convicts set free in enemy territories. From captured orders it emerges that they are instructed not only to tie up prisoners, but also to kill out-of-hand unarmed captives who they think might prove an encumbrance to them, or hinder them in successfully carrying out their aims. Orders have indeed been found in which the killing of prisoners has positively been demanded of them.
2. In this connection it has already been notified in an Appendix to Army Orders of 7.10.1942. that in future, Germany will adopt the same methods against these Sabotage units of the British and their Allies; i.e. that, whenever they appear, they shall be ruthlessly destroyed by the German troops.
3. I order, therefore:— From now on all men operating against German troops in so-called Commando raids in Europe or in Africa, are to be annihilated to the last man. This is to be carried out whether they be soldiers in uniform, or saboteurs, with or without arms; and whether fighting or seeking to escape; and it is equally immaterial whether they come into action from Ships and Aircraft, or whether they land by parachute. Even if these individuals on discovery make obvious their intention of giving themselves up as prisoners, no pardon is on any account to be given. On this matter a report is to be made on each case to Headquarters for the information of Higher Command.
4. Should individual members of these Commandos, such as agents, saboteurs etc., fall into the hands of the Armed Forces through any means – as, for example, through the Police in one of the Occupied Territories – they are to be instantly handed over to the SD
  To hold them in military custody – for example in POW camps, etc., – even if only as a temporary measure, is strictly forbidden.
5. This order does not apply to the treatment of those enemy soldiers who are taken prisoner or give themselves up in open battle, in the course of normal operations, large-scale attacks; or in major assault landings or airborne operations. Neither does it apply to those who fall into our hands after a sea fight, nor to those enemy soldiers who, after air battle, seek to save their lives by parachute.
6. I will hold all Commanders and Officers responsible under Military Law for any omission to carry out this order, whether by failure in their duty to instruct their units accordingly, or if they themselves act contrary to it.

=== Allied casualties ===
Dozens of Allied special forces soldiers were executed as the result of this order.

"Commandos" of those types captured were turned over to German security and police forces and transported to concentration camps for execution. The Gazette citation reporting the awarding of the G.C. to Yeo-Thomas describes this process in detail.

POW Allied airmen were also killed via the "Commando Order".

Victims include:

- The first victims were two officers and five other ranks of Operation Musketoon, who were shot in Sachsenhausen on the morning of 23 October 1942.
- In November 1942, British survivors of Operation Freshman were executed.
- In December 1942, British Royal Marine commandos captured during Operation Frankton were executed under this order. After the captured Royal Marines were executed by a naval firing squad in Bordeaux, the Commander of the German Navy Admiral Erich Raeder wrote in the Seekriegsleitung war diary that the executions of the Royal Marines were something "new in international law since the soldiers were wearing uniforms". American historian Charles Thomas wrote that Raeder's remarks about the executions in the Seekriegsleitung war diary seemed to be some sort of ironic comment, which might have reflected a bad conscience on the part of Raeder.
- On 30 July 1943, the captured seven-man crew of the Royal Norwegian Navy motor torpedo boat MTB 345 were executed by the Germans in Bergen, Norway on the basis of the Commando Order.
- In January 1944, British Lt. William A. Millar escaped from Colditz Castle and vanished; it is speculated he was captured and killed in a concentration camp.
- In March 1944, 15 soldiers of the U.S. Army, including two officers, landed on the Italian coast as part of an OSS operation code-named Ginny II. They were captured and executed.
- After the Normandy landings, 34 SAS soldiers and a USAAF pilot were captured during Operation Bulbasket and executed. Most were shot, but three were killed by lethal injection while recovering from wounds in a hospital.
- On 9 August 1944, a U.S. airman POW was killed in Germany; postwar 4 involved were executed; others served prison terms.
- In September 1944, seven British Commandos (along with 40 Dutch members of Englandspiel) were executed over two days at KZ Mauthausen.
- On 21 November 1944 U.S. airman and prisoner of war Lt. Americo S. Galle was executed at Enschede, Netherlands by SS-Unterscharführer Herbert Germoth by order of SS General Karl Eberhard Schöngarth.
- On 9 December 1944, five U.S. airmen of the 20th Bombardment Squadron were captured and executed near Kaplitz, Czechoslovakia. Franz Strasser was tried and executed on 10 December 1945 for participating in the murders.
- Between October 1944 and March 1945, nine men of the United States Army Air Forces were summarily executed after being shot down and captured in Jürgen Stroop's district. Their known names were Sergeant Willard P. Perry, Sergeant Robert W. Garrison, Private Ray R. Herman, Second Lieutenant William A. Duke, Second Lieutenant Archibald B. Monroe, Private Jimmie R. Heathman, Lieutenant William H. Forman, and Private Robert T. McDonald. When Polish journalist Kazimierz Moczarski reminded him that the killing of POWs was defined as criminal under the Hague and Geneva Conventions, Stroop responded, "It was common knowledge that American flyers were terrorists and murderers who used methods contrary to civilised norms... We were given a statement to that effect from the highest authorities. It was accompanied by an order from Heinrich Himmler." As a result, he explained, all nine POWs had been taken to the forest and given "a ration of lead for their American necks".
- On 24 January 1945, nine OSS men, including Lt. Holt Green of the Dawes mission, others of the Houseboat mission, four British SOE agents, and AP war correspondent Joseph Morton, were shot at Mauthausen by SS-Hauptsturmführer Georg Bachmayer on orders of Ernst Kaltenbrunner. Morton was the only Allied correspondent to be executed by the Axis during World War II.
- In 1945, Lt. Jack Taylor USNR and the Dupont mission were captured by the men of Gestapo agent Johann Sanitzer. Sanitzer asked the RSHA for instructions on a possible deal that Taylor proposed, but Kaltenbrunner's staff reminded him "of Hitler's edict that all captured officers attached to foreign missions were to be executed". Taylor was convicted of espionage, though he claimed to be an ordinary soldier. He was sent to Mauthausen. He survived, barely, but gathered evidence, and was eventually a witness at the Nuremberg trials. (Note: Taylor was forced to work on a crew that built a crematorium. His weight fell to 112 pounds (51 kg; 8.0 st) and he developed dysentery. Taylor tried to memorise atrocities told to him by other prisoners, in the mutual hope that he could eventually bring justice to the perpetrators. He survived the camp only because a friendly Czech "trustee" of the Nazi guards, Milos Stransky, had seen his execution order and burned it. After liberation, he returned to the camp to document and gather evidence, including the "death books" that recorded made-up and true versions of each prisoner's death. The evidence was later used at war crimes trials. He was also a witness at those trials. The rest of the mission, Graf, Ebbing, and Huppmann, were not technically "foreign soldiers" so the Commando order probably did not technically apply to them, although they were sentenced to death for being traitors. They escaped and survived.)
- On 13 February 1945, eight survivors of a B-17 crash 48163 of the 772nd Bombardment Squadron in Austria were captured; four survived the war while four were executed.
- On 20 February 1945, OSS agent Roderick Stephen Hall was murdered by the SS in Bolzano, Italy. In 1946 his murderers, who used the Commando Order as their defence, were executed for the murder of Hall, pilot Charles Parker, SAS officers Roger Littlejohn and David Crowley as well as U.S. airmen George Hammond, Hardy Narron, and Medard Tafoya.

=== War crime ===
The laws of war in 1942 stated, "it is especially forbidden... to declare that no quarter will be given". This was established under Article 23 (d) of the 1907 Hague Convention IV – The Laws and Customs of War on Land. The Geneva Convention of 1929, which Germany had ratified, defined who should be considered a prisoner of war on capture, which included enemy soldiers in proper uniforms, and how they should be treated. Under both the Hague and Geneva Conventions, it was legal to execute "spies and saboteurs" disguised in civilian clothes or uniforms of the enemy. The Germans claimed in paragraph one of their order that they were acting only in retaliation in a quid pro quo for claimed Allied violation of the Geneva Convention regarding the execution of prisoners and other heinous acts; however, insofar as the Commando Order applied to soldiers in proper uniforms, it was in direct and deliberate violation of both the customary laws of war and Germany's treaty obligations. (Note: The Hague regulations were found to be customary law by the judges sitting at the Nuremberg Trials)

The execution of Allied commandos without trial was also a violation of Article 30 of the 1907 Hague Convention IV – The Laws and Customs of War on Land: "A spy taken in the act shall not be punished without previous trial." That provision includes only soldiers caught behind enemy lines in disguises, and not those wearing proper uniforms. Soldiers in proper uniforms cannot be punished for being lawful combatants and must be treated as prisoners of war upon capture except those disguised in civilian clothes or uniforms of the enemy for military operations behind enemy lines.

The fact that Hitler's staff took special measures to keep the order secret, including the limitation of its printing to 12 initial copies, strongly suggests that it was known to be illegal. He also knew the order would be unpopular with the professional military, particularly the part that stated it would stand even if captured commandos were in proper uniforms (in contrast to the usual provision of international law that only commandos disguised in civilian clothes or uniforms of the enemy could be treated as insurgents or spies, as stated in the Ex parte Quirin, the Hostages Trial, and the trial of Otto Skorzeny and others). The order included measures designed to force military staff to obey its provisions.

Some German commanders, including Erwin Rommel, had refused to relay the order to their troops since they considered it to be contrary to honourable conduct.

== Aftermath ==
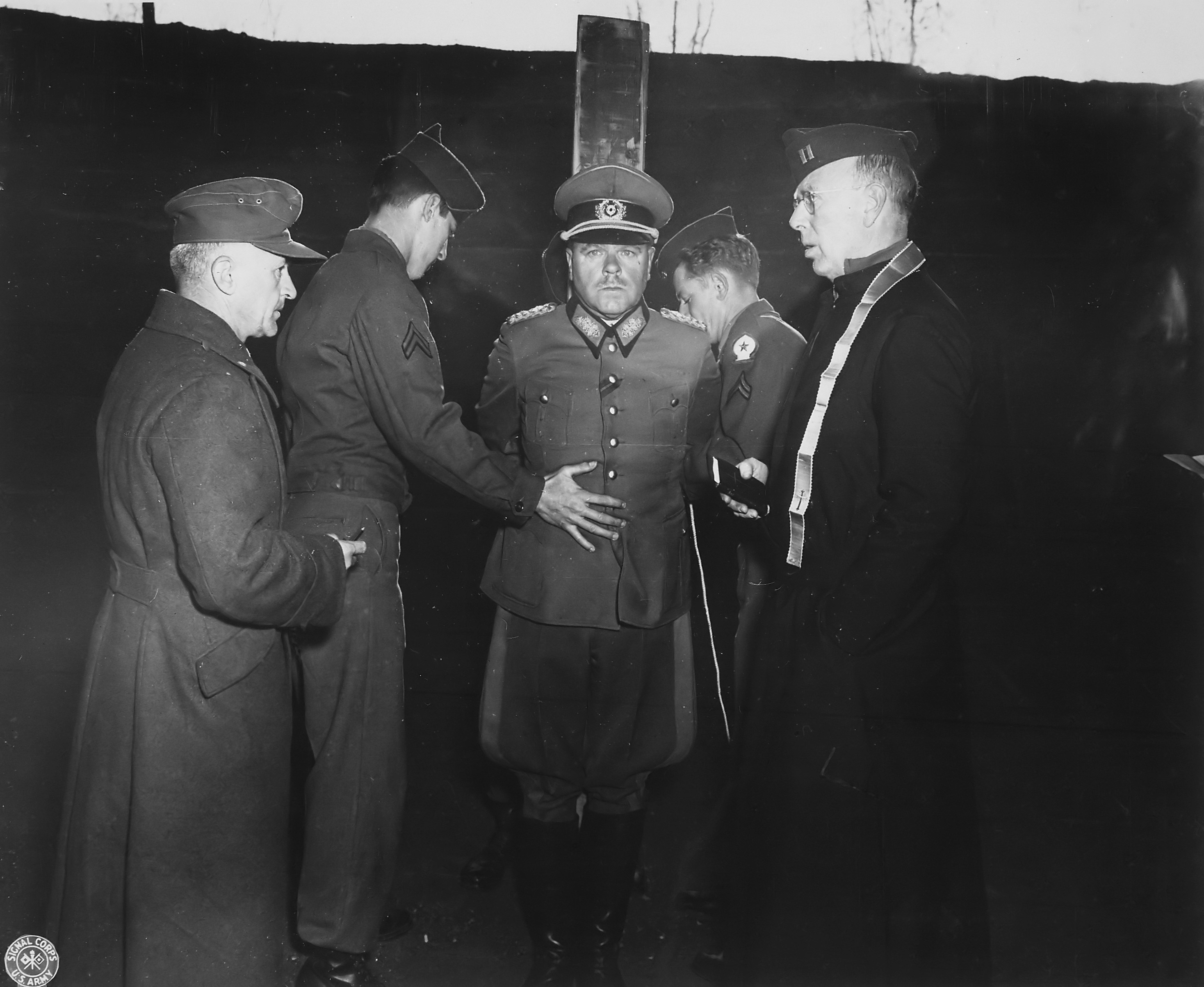
General Anton Dostler was tried and executed for ordering the execution of American prisoners of war in accordance with the Commando Order.

German officers who carried out executions under the Commando Order were found guilty of war crimes in postwar tribunals, including at the Nuremberg trials. Many claimed in their defence that they themselves risked execution if they had disobeyed the order, but this was disproved.

- General Anton Dostler, who ordered the execution of 15 U.S. soldiers of the Ginny II operation in Italy, was sentenced to death and executed on 1 December 1945. His defence that he had only relayed superior orders was rejected at trial.
- The Commando Order was one of the specifications in the charge against Generaloberst Alfred Jodl, who was convicted and hanged on 16 October 1946.
- Likewise, Field Marshal Wilhelm Keitel's endorsement of the Commando and Commissar Orders was one of the key factors in his conviction for war crimes; for the same reason, his request for a military execution (by firing squad) was denied, and he was instead hanged like Jodl on 16 October 1946.
- Another officer charged with enforcing the Commando Order at Nuremberg was Admiral Erich Raeder. Under cross-examination, Raeder admitted to passing on the Commando Order to the Kriegsmarine and to enforcing the Commando Order by ordering the summary execution of captured British Royal Marines after the Operation Frankton raid at Bordeaux in December 1942. Raeder testified in his defence that he believed that the Commando Order was a "justified" order, and that the execution of the two Royal Marines was no war crime in his own opinion. The International Military Tribunal did not share Raeder's view of the Commando Order, convicted him of war crimes for ordering the executions, and sentenced him to life imprisonment; he was released in 1955 and died in 1960.
- Another war crimes trial was held in Braunschweig, Germany, against Generaloberst Nikolaus von Falkenhorst, Supreme Commander of German forces in Norway from 1940–44. The latter was held responsible, among other things, for invoking the Commando Order against survivors of the unsuccessful British commando raid against the Vemork heavy water plant at Rjukan, Norway in 1942 (Operation Freshman). He was sentenced to death in 1946; the sentence was later commuted to 20 years' imprisonment, and he was released in 1953 for reasons of health. He died in 1968.
- High-ranking intelligence officer Josef Kieffer was sentenced to death at a court-martial hearing for ordering the executions of five SAS prisoners and hanged in 1947. Two others, Karl Haug and Richard Schnur, were likewise executed for participating in the massacre on Kieffer's orders, while Obersturmführer Otto Ilgenfritz received fifteen years in prison.

== See also ==
- Adolf Hitler's directives
- Commissar Order
- George Lane (British Army officer)
- German commando operations
  - Gleiwitz incident, 1939
  - Operation Greif, 1944
- Kugel-Erlass
- Le Paradis massacre
- Severity Order
- Walter Koch, who refused to follow the order

== Bibliography ==
- Berglyd, Jostein (2007), Operation Freshman: The Actions and the Aftermath, Solna: Leandoer & Ekholm, ISBN 978-91-975895-9-8
- Margaritis, Peter (2019). Countdown to D-Day: The German Perspective. Oxford, UK & PA, US: Casemate. pp. 447–456. ISBN 978-1-61200-769-4.
- Persico, Joseph E (1979), Piercing the Reich, New York: Viking Press, ISBN 0-670-55490-1
- Wiggan, Richard (1986), Operation Freshman: The Rjukan Heavy Water Raid 1942, London: William Kimber & Co, ISBN 978-0-7183-0571-0
