= Criminal orders (Nazi Germany) =

Wehrmacht orders given during the invasion of the Soviet Union in 1941

Criminal orders is the collective name given to a series of orders, directives and decrees given before and during the German invasion of the Soviet Union in World War II by the Wehrmacht High Command. The criminal orders went beyond established codes of conduct and led to widespread atrocities on the Eastern Front.

== Orders issued in 1939 ==
While the term "criminal orders" is usually associated with the German invasion of the Soviet Union in 1941, Jochen Böhler is convinced that some orders issued by the Wehrmacht command during the invasion of Poland in September 1939 may already be considered "criminal orders." He pointed out, in this context, the following:

- A special directive issued on September 4, 1939, regarding the supply of the 8th Army's rear services, included a recommendation to execute without trial not only partisans and those found with weapons, but also Polish civilians "found in homes and farms from which [German] soldiers were fired upon."
- An order issued on September 10, 1939, by the commander of Army Group North, General Fedor von Bock, instructing troops to burn down houses behind the front lines from which shots had been fired at German soldiers. If it was not possible to determine the exact source of the fire, the entire village was to be burned down.

== Orders issued in 1941 ==
- Barbarossa decree, issued 13 May 1941
- Guidelines for the Conduct of the Troops in Russia, issued 19 May 1941
- Commissar Order, issued 6 June 1941
- Orders Concerning the Deployment of the Security Police and the Security Service within Military Formations, issued 28 April 1941
- Orders relating to the treatment of prisoners of war, issued June to December 1941

== See also ==
- Commando Order
- Myth of the clean Wehrmacht
- Severity Order
- War crimes of the Wehrmacht

== Bibliography ==
- Heer, Hannes; Manoschek, Walter; Pollak, Alexander; Wodak, Ruth (2008). The Discursive Construction of History: Remembering the Wehrmacht's War of Annihilation. New York: Palgrave Macmillan. ISBN 9780230013230.
- Bartov, Omer (1986). The Eastern Front, 1941–1945, German Troops and the Barbarisation of Warfare. New York: St. Martins Press. ISBN 0312224869.
- Beorn, Waitman (2014). Marching into Darkness. London, UK: Harvard University Press. ISBN 978-0-674-72550-8.
- Böhler, Jochen (2009). Zbrodnie Wehrmachtu w Polsce [Wehrmacht Crimes in Poland] (in Polish). Kraków: Znak. ISBN 978-83-240-1225-1.
