= Commissar Order =

1941 Nazi order

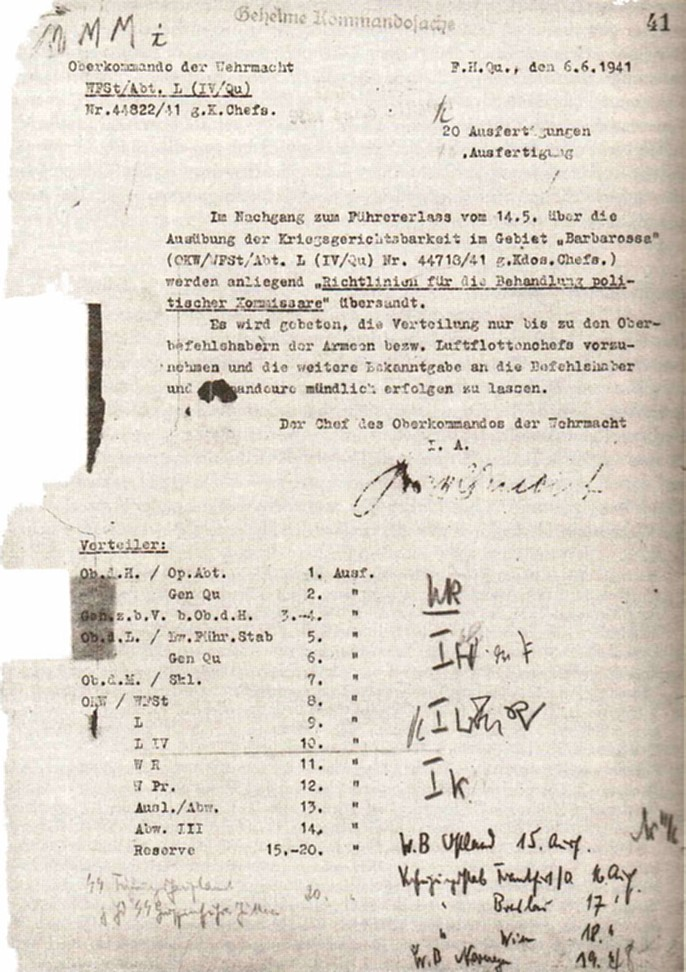
First page of the Commissar Order, dated 6 June 1941

The Commissar Order (German: Kommissarbefehl) was an order issued by the German High Command (OKW) on 6 June 1941 before Operation Barbarossa. Its official name was Guidelines for the Treatment of Political Commissars (Richtlinien für die Behandlung politischer Kommissare). It instructed the Wehrmacht that any Soviet political commissar identified among captured troops be summarily executed as a purported enforcer of the so-called Judeo-Bolshevism ideology in military forces. It is one of a series of criminal orders issued by the Nazi leadership.

According to the order, all those prisoners who could be identified as "thoroughly bolshevised or as active representatives of the Bolshevist ideology" should also be killed.

== History ==
Planning for Operation Barbarossa began in June 1940. In December 1940, Adolf Hitler began vague allusions to the operation to senior generals on how the war was to be conducted, giving him the opportunity to gauge their reaction to such matters as collaboration with the SS in the "rendering harmless" of Bolsheviks, which eventually culminated in Führer Directive 21 on 18 December 1940. The Wehrmacht was already politicised to some extent, having participated in the extra-legal killings of Ernst Röhm and his associates in 1934, of communists in the Sudetenland in 1938, and of Czech and German political exiles in France in 1940. On 3 March 1941, Hitler explained to his senior military advisers how the war of annihilation in the East was to be waged. On that same day, instructions incorporating Hitler's demands went to Section L of the Oberkommando der Wehrmacht (OKW) (under Deputy Chief Walter Warlimont); these provided the basis for the "Guidelines in Special Areas to Instructions No. 21 (Case Barbarossa)" discussing, among other matters, the interaction of the army and SS in the theatre of operations, deriving from the "need to neutralise at once leading bolsheviks and commissars."

Discussions proceeded on 17 March during a situation conference, where Chief of the OKH General Staff Franz Halder, Quartermaster-General Eduard Wagner, and Chief of Operational Department of the OKH Adolf Heusinger were present. Hitler declared: "The intelligentsia established by Stalin must be exterminated. The most brutal violence is to be used in the Great Russian Empire" (quoted from Halder's War Diary entry of 17 March).

On 30 March, Hitler addressed over 200 senior officers in the Reich Chancellery. Among those present was Halder, who recorded the key points of the speech. Hitler argued that the war against the Soviet Union "cannot be conducted in a knightly fashion" because it was a war of "ideologies and racial differences." He further declared that the commissars had to be "liquidated" without mercy because they were the "bearers of ideologies directly opposed to National Socialism." He stipulated the "annihilation of the Bolshevik commissars and the Communist intelligentsia" (thus laying the foundation for the Commissar Order), dismissed the idea of courts-martial for felonies committed by German troops, and emphasized the different nature of the war in the East from the war in the West.

Hitler, well aware that this order was contrary to international laws prohibiting extrajudicial executions and other atrocities in wartime, personally absolved in advance any soldier or officer who violated international law in enforcing this order, making the legally specious argument that the Hague Conventions of 1899 and 1907 did not apply to the forthcoming war since the Soviet Union had not signed them. The Soviet Union, as a distinct entity from the Russian Empire, did not, in fact, sign the Geneva Convention of 1929. However, Germany did, and was bound by Article 82, stating "In case, in time of war, one of the belligerents is not a party to the Convention, its provisions shall nevertheless remain in force as between the belligerents who are parties thereto."

The Commissar Order read as follows:

Guidelines for the Treatment of Political Commissars

In the battle against Bolshevism, the adherence of the enemy to the principles of humanity or international law is not to be counted upon. In particular it can be expected that those of us who are taken prisoner will be treated with hatred, cruelty and inhumanity by political commissars of every kind.

The troops must be aware that:

1. In this battle mercy or considerations of international law is false. They are a danger to our own safety and to the rapid pacification of the conquered territories.

2. The originators of barbaric, Asiatic methods of warfare are the political commissars. So immediate and unhesitatingly severe measures must be undertaken against them. They are therefore, when captured in battle, as a matter of routine to be dispatched by firearms.

The following provisions also apply:

3. ... Political commissars as agents of the enemy troops are recognizable from their special badge—a red star with a golden woven hammer and sickle on the sleeves.... They are to be separated from the prisoners of war immediately, i.e. already on the battlefield. This is necessary, in order to remove from them any possibility of influencing the captured soldiers. These commissars are not to be recognized as soldiers; the protection due to prisoners of war under international law does not apply to them. When they have been separated, they are to be finished off.

4. Political commissars who have not made themselves guilty of any enemy action nor are suspected of such should be left unmolested for the time being. It will only be possible after further penetration of the country to decide whether remaining functionaries may be left in place or are to be handed over to the Sonderkommando. The aim should be for the latter to carry out the assessment.

In judging the question "guilty or not guilty", the personal impression of the attitude and bearing of the commissar should as a matter of principle count for more than the facts of the case which it may not be possible to prove.

== Response ==
The first draft of the Commissar Order was issued by General Eugen Müller on 6 May 1941 and called for the shooting of all commissars in order to avoid letting any captured commissar reach a POW camp in Germany. German historian Hans-Adolf Jacobsen wrote:

There was never any doubt in the minds of German Army commanders that the order deliberately flouted international law; that is borne out by the unusually small number of written copies of the Kommissarbefehl which were distributed.

The paragraph in which Müller called for army commanders to prevent "excesses" was removed on the request of the OKW. German Army Commander-in-Chief Walther von Brauchitsch amended the order on 24 May 1941 by attaching Müller's paragraph and calling on the army to maintain discipline in the enforcement of the order. The final draft of the order was issued by the OKW on 6 June 1941 and was restricted only to the most senior commanders, who were instructed to inform their subordinates verbally.

Nazi propaganda presented Barbarossa as an ideological-racial war between German National Socialism and "Judeo-Bolshevism," dehumanising the Soviet enemy as a force of Slavic Untermenschen (sub-humans) and "Asiatic" savages engaging in "barbaric Asiatic fighting methods" commanded by evil Jewish commissars to whom German troops were to grant no mercy. The vast majority of Wehrmacht officers and soldiers tended to regard the war in Nazi terms, seeing their Soviet opponents as sub-human.

The enforcement of the Commissar Order led to thousands of executions. German historian Jürgen Förster wrote in 1989 that it was simply not true that the Commissar Order was not enforced, as most German Army commanders claimed in their memoirs, and some German historians like Ernst Nolte were still claiming. The majority of German units carried out the Commissar Order, although they had questions when doing so, as Jochen Hellbeck points out:

Wehrmacht commanders filed many inquiries seeking assistance: Which Red Army units fielded commissars? (Correct answer: divisions and regiments.) Did a political instructor (politruk), as political officers on the battalion and company levels were called, count as a commissar? (Yes.)

As Barbarossa progressed, fewer Soviet political officers wore the red star on their sleeves. "As a result, the Germans often 'identified' Soviet political officers on the basis of their Jewish appearance, longer hair (as opposed to the shorn heads of ordinary recruits), educated looks, or clean hands."

Erich von Manstein passed on the Commissar Order to his subordinates, who executed all captured commissars, something that he was convicted of by a British court in 1949. After the war, Manstein lied about disobeying the Commissar Order, saying he had been opposed to the order, and never enforced it. On 23 September 1941, after several Wehrmacht commanders had asked for the order to be softened as a way of encouraging the Red Army to surrender, Hitler declined "any modification of the existing orders regarding the treatment of political commissars."

When the Commissar Order became widely known among the Red Army, it provoked more determined resistance to German forces. This unwanted effect was cited in German appeals to Hitler (e.g., by Claus von Stauffenberg), who finally cancelled the order after one year, on 6 May 1942.

The Commissar Order was used as evidence by the prosecution at the Nuremberg trials, and it was debated as part of the broader issue of whether the German generals were obligated to follow orders from Hitler even when they knew those orders were illegal.

== See also ==
- Commando Order
- German atrocities committed against Soviet prisoners of war
- Main Political Directorate of the Soviet Army and Soviet Navy
- Severity Order
