= Guidelines for the Conduct of the Troops in Russia =

Criminal order that dictated the conduct of German troops in Operation Barbarossa

Guidelines for the Conduct of the Troops in Russia (German: "Richtlinien für das Verhalten der Truppe in Rußland") was one of the criminal orders, issued on May 19, 1941, during World War II. The guidelines detailed the expected behaviour of German troops during the invasion of the Soviet Union. Civilians were included as opposition groups. The order states "Bolshevism is the deadly enemy of the National Socialist German people. This corrosive Weltanschauung – and those who support it – are what Germany’s struggle is against. This struggle demands a ruthless and strenuous crackdown on Bolshevik agitators, irregulars, saboteurs and Jews, and the complete elimination of both active and passive resistance. The Asiatic soldiers, in particular, are inscrutable, unpredictable, underhand and unfeeling".

The order described Nazi Germany's planned war against Russia as a "historic task to liberate the German people once forever from the Asiatic-Jewish danger".

Waitman Wade Beorn writing in Marching into Darkness notes that the order targets Jews explicitly as "racial enemies to be eliminated by the military regardless of their behavior".

== Bibliography ==
- Heer, Hannes; Manoschek, Walter; Pollak, Alexander; Wodak, Ruth (2008). The Discursive Construction of History: Remembering the Wehrmacht's War of Annihilation. New York: Palgrave Macmillan. ISBN 9780230013230.
- Bartov, Omer (1986). The Eastern Front, 1941–1945, German Troops and the Barbarisation of Warfare. New York: St. Martins Press. ISBN 0312224869.
- Beorn, Waitman (2014). Marching into Darkness. London, UK: Harvard University Press. ISBN 978-0-674-72550-8.
