= 3rd SS Panzer Division Totenkopf =

German armored division

- 3. SS-Panzerdivision "Totenkopf"
- Divisional insignia
- Active: 1939–45
- Country: Nazi Germany
- Branch: (Schutzstaffel) Waffen-SS
- Type: Panzer
- Role: Armoured warfare
- Size: Division
- Nickname: Death's Head Division
- Engagements: World War II; Eastern Front; Budapest Offensive; Operation Konrad III; Operation Spring Awakening

Commanders
- Notable commanders: Theodor Eicke; Max Simon

The 3rd SS Panzer Division "Totenkopf" (German: 3. SS-Panzerdivision "Totenkopf") was an elite division of the Waffen-SS of Nazi Germany during World War II, formed from the Standarten of the SS-TV. Its name, Totenkopf, is German for "death's head" – the skull and crossbones symbol – and it is thus sometimes referred to as the Death's Head Division.

The division was formed through the expansion of Kampfgruppe Eicke, a battle group named – in keeping with German military practice – after its commander, Theodor Eicke. Most of the battle group's personnel had been transferred to the Waffen-SS from concentration camp guard units, which were known collectively as SS-Totenkopfverbände; others were former members of Selbstschutz: ethnic German militias that had committed war crimes in Poland.

The division became notorious for its brutality, and committed numerous war crimes, including the Le Paradis and Chasselay massacres. The remnants of the division surrendered on 9 May 1945 to American forces in Czechoslovakia.

== Formation ==
The SS Division Totenkopf was formed in October 1939. The division had close ties to the camp service and its members. When it was first formed a total of 6,500 men from the SS-Totenkopfverbände (SS-TV) were transferred into the Totenkopf Division. The Totenkopf was initially formed from concentration camp guards of the 1st ("Oberbayern"), 2nd ("Brandenburg") and 3rd ("Thüringen") Standarten (regiments) of the SS-Totenkopfverbände and men from the SS Heimwehr Danzig.

Members of other SS militias were also transferred into the division in early 1940; these units had been involved in massacres of Polish civilians, political leaders and prisoners of war. The division had officers from the SS-Verfügungstruppe (SS-VT), of whom many had already seen action in Poland. The division was commanded by SS-Obergruppenführer Theodor Eicke.

== Battle of France ==
At the time of the Battle of France, the division was equipped with ex-Czech weapons.

Totenkopf was initially held in reserve during the Battle of France and invasion of the Low Countries in May 1940. The division was committed on 16 May to the front in Belgium. Later, it was decided that Totenkopf would reinforce the breakthrough of Erwin Rommel's 7th Panzer Division in the Cambrai area. Reaching the Bazuel area straddling both sides of the river it arrived on the front on 19 May, facing elements of the French 1st Moroccan Infantry Division, 5th North African Infantry Division, and 9th Motorized Division. Totenkopf suffered 16 dead and 53 wounded while killing 200 Moroccan soldiers in its first day in action. In its first major battle it captured the town of Catillon-sur-Sambre and its associated canal in fierce house-to-house fighting, blocking the exits of the town and trapping the Moroccan force in the center around the market square, eventually captured thousands of remaining troops. Soldiers from Totenkopf executed many captured Moroccans, due to Arabs being considered "racially inferior". On the morning of the next day, May 20 it contained a major Moroccan counter attack near Ribeauville, driving it back with its own counter attack, before crossing the Selle river and linking up with Rommel's division in the outskirts of Cambrai. Overall in the actions around the Cambrai/Sambre area the division captured 16,000 troops.

Whilst subsequently trying to drive through to the coast, Totenkopf was involved in the Battle of Arras. On 21 May units of the 1st Army Tank Brigade, supported by the 50th (Northumbrian) Infantry Division, overran some of Totenkopf's positions, their standard anti-tank gun, the 3.7 cm PaK 36, being no match for the British Matilda tank although they quickly halted the British. In the following days, the unit committed several large-scale massacres of French civilians, most notable the Berles-Monchel and Aubigny-en-Artois massacres. On 27 May, the 4 Company of the Totenkopf under the command of Hauptsturmführer Fritz Knöchlein, committed the Le Paradis massacre, where 97 soldiers of the 2nd Battalion, Royal Norfolk Regiment were machine-gunned after surrendering, with survivors killed with bayonets. Only two men survived.

== Invasion of the Soviet Union ==
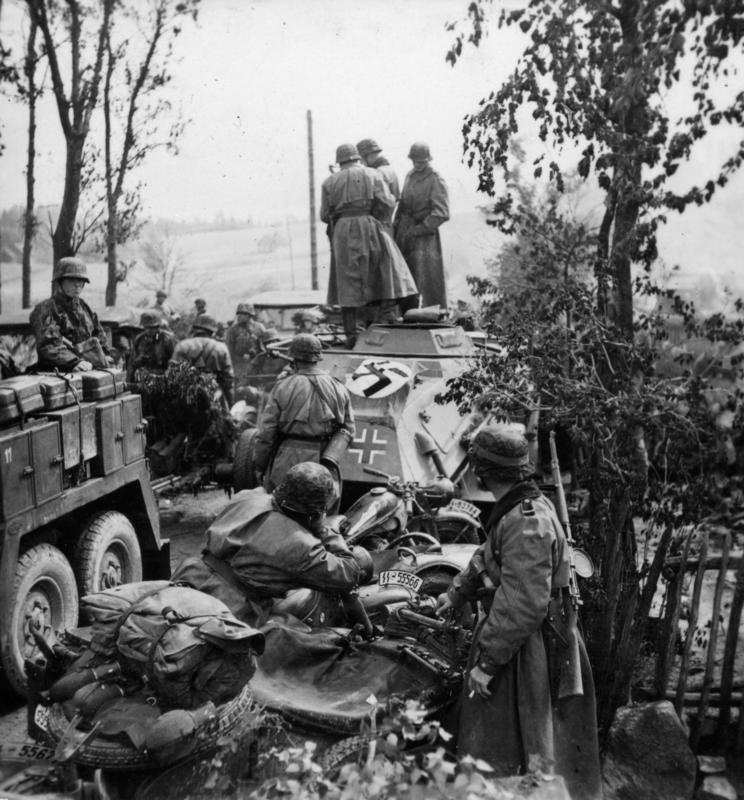
Motorized troops during Operation Barbarossa, September 1941

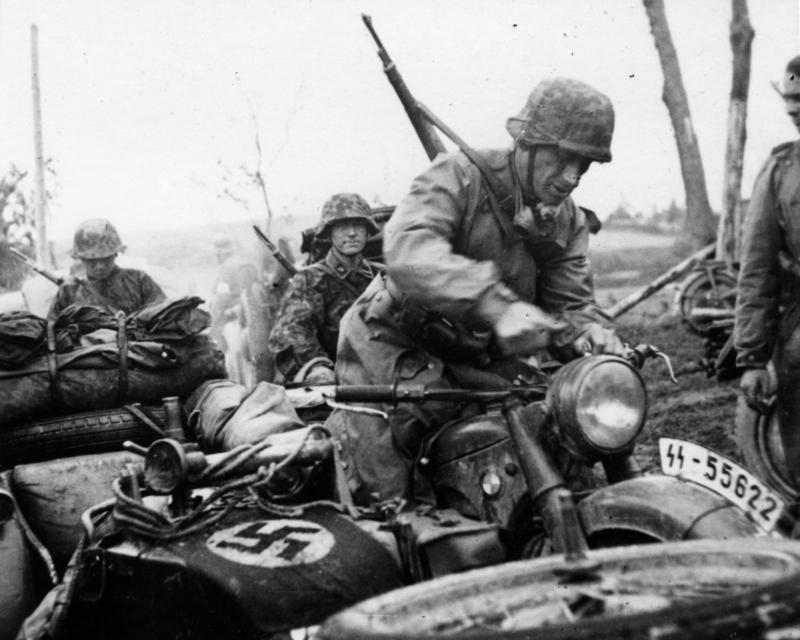
Motorized infantry on their way to Leningrad, 1941

In April 1941, the division was ordered East to join Field Marshal Wilhelm von Leeb's Army Group North. Leeb's force was tasked with advancing on Leningrad and formed the northern wing of Operation Barbarossa. It soon moved into a staging area near Insterburg and was assigned to Panzer Group 4. Totenkopf took part in the advance through Lithuania and Latvia, and by July had breached the Stalin Line. The division then advanced past Demyansk to Leningrad where it was involved in heavy fighting in August.

During the Soviet winter counter-offensive, the division was encircled for several months near Demyansk in what became known as the Demyansk Pocket. During the fighting in the pocket, it was re-designated "Kampfgruppe Eicke" due to its reduced size. In April 1942, the division broke out of the pocket. At Demyansk, about 80% of its men were killed, wounded or missing in action. The division was sent to France to be refitted in late October 1942. While there, the division took part in Case Anton, the takeover of Vichy France in November 1942. For this operation, the division was supplied with a tank battalion and redesignated 3rd SS Panzergrenadier Division Totenkopf. The division remained in France until February 1943, when its previous commander, Theodor Eicke, resumed control.

== Battle of Kursk and retreat on the Eastern Front ==
In February 1943 the division was moved back to the Eastern Front as part of Erich von Manstein's Army Group South. The division, as a part of SS-Obergruppenführer Paul Hausser's II SS Panzer Corps, took part in the Third Battle of Kharkov, blunting the Soviet offensive. During this campaign, Theodor Eicke was killed when his spotter aircraft was shot down. Hermann Priess succeeded Eicke as commander. The SS Panzer Corps, including the division, was then shifted north to take part in Operation Citadel, the offensive aimed at reducing the Kursk salient. It was during February 1943 that the 3rd SS Panzer Regiment received a company of Tiger I heavy tanks.

The attack was launched on 5 July 1943 with the II SS Panzer Corps attacking the southern flank of the salient as the spearhead for Generaloberst Hermann Hoth's 4th Panzer Army. The division covered the advance on the left flank of the II SS Panzer Corps, with the SS Division Leibstandarte forming the spearhead. With the advance slower than had been planned, Hausser ordered his II SS Panzer Corps to split in two, with the Totenkopf crossing the Psel River northwards and then continuing on towards the town of Prokhorovka. In the early morning of 9 July, 6th SS Motorised Regiment Theodor Eicke attacked northwards, crossing the Psel and attempted to seize the strategic Hill 226.6, but failed to do so until the afternoon. This meant that the northern advance slowed and the majority of the division was still south of the Psel, where elements of 5th SS Motorised Regiment 5 Thule continued to advance towards Prokhorovka and cover the flank of the Leibstandarte.

By 11 July, elements of the division crossed the Psel and secured Kliuchi. In the afternoon of 12 July, near the village of Andreyevka on the south bank of the Psel, the Soviet forces launched a major counterattack against Regiment Thule and the division's battalion of assault guns during the Battle of Prokhorovka. Elements of the division engaged lead units of the 5th Guards Tank Army, halting the Soviet advance and inflicting severe damage to the Soviet forces, but at the cost of the majority of the division's remaining operational tanks. While the II SS Panzer Corps had halted the Soviet counteroffensive, it had exhausted itself. Citadel was called off on 14 July.

Along with the SS Division Das Reich, the division was reassigned to General Karl-Adolf Hollidt's reformed 6th Army in southern Ukraine. The 6th Army was tasked with eliminating the Soviet bridgehead over the Mius River. The division was involved in heavy fighting over the next several weeks. During the July–August battles for Hill 213 and the town of Stepanovka, the division suffered heavy losses, and over the course of the campaign on the Mius-Front, it suffered more casualties than it had during Operation Citadel. By the time the Soviet bridgehead was eliminated, the division had lost 1,500 troops; the Panzer regiment was reduced to 20 tanks.

The division was then moved north, back to Kharkov. Along with Das Reich, Totenkopf took part in the battles to halt Operation Rumyantsev and to prevent the Soviet capture of the city. The city was abandoned on 23 August due to the threats on the German flanks. In October 1943, the division was reformed as a Panzer division. The Panzer battalion was officially upgraded to a regiment, and the two motorised regiments were given the titles "Theodor Eicke" and "Totenkopf". The division, along with other Axis formations, continued its retreat towards the Romanian border. By November, the division was engaged in fighting against Red Army's attacks over the vital town of Krivoi Rog to the west of the Dniepr.

== Warsaw ==
In January 1944, Totenkopf was still engaged in heavy defensive fighting east of the Dniepr near Krivoi Rog. In February 1944, Totenkopf took part in the relief attempt of German troops encircled in the Korsun Pocket. In the second week of March, after a fierce battle near Kirovograd, Totenkopf fell back behind the Bug River. Totenkopf took up new defensive positions. After two weeks of heavy fighting, again alongside the Panzer-Grenadier-Division Grossdeutschland, the Axis forces retreated to the Dniestr on the Romanian border near Iaşi. In the first week of April, the division received replacements and new equipment, including Panther tanks. In the second week of April, Totenkopf took part in fighting against a heavy Soviet Army attacks towards Second Battle of Târgu Frumos. By 7 May, the front had quieted and Totenkopf resumed its reorganizing.

In the Second Battle of Târgu Frumos, elements of the division, together with elements of the Großdeutschland, managed to halt an armoured assault by the Red Army. The assault, which in many aspects bore similarities to those of the later British Operation Goodwood, was carried out by approximately 500 tanks. In early July, the division was ordered to the area near Grodno in Poland, where it formed a part of SS-Obergruppenführer Herbert Gille's IV SS Panzer Corps, covering the approaches to Warsaw near the Modlin Fortress.

After the Soviet Operation Bagration and the destruction of Army Group Centre the German lines had been pushed back over 480 kilometres, to the outskirts of the Polish capital. The division arrived at the Warsaw front in late July 1944. After the collapse of the German Army Group Centre, the IV SS Panzer Corps was one of the few functioning formations on the central section of the Eastern Front. On 1 August 1944, the Armia Krajowa (the Polish Home Army) launched the Warsaw Uprising. A column of Totenkopf Tiger tanks were caught up in the fighting, and several were lost. The Totenkopf itself was not involved in the suppression of the uprising, instead guarding the front lines, and fighting off several Red Army probe attacks into the city's eastern suburbs.

In several battles near the town of Modlin in mid-August, the Totenkopf, fighting alongside the SS Division Wiking and the Hermann Göring Division destroyed the Soviet 3rd Tank Corps. The terrain around Modlin is excellent for armour, and Totenkopf's panzers exploited this to their advantage, engaging Soviet tanks from a range where the superiority of the German optics and the 75 mm high-velocity gun gave the Panthers an edge over the T-34s.

== Budapest relief attempts ==
The efforts of the Totenkopf, "Wiking" and "Hermann Göring" divisions allowed the Germans to hold the Vistula line and establish Army Group Vistula. In December 1944, the IX SS Mountain Corps (Alpine Corps-Croatia) was encircled in Budapest. Hitler ordered the IV SS Panzer Corps to redeploy south to relieve the 95,000 Germans and Hungarians trapped in the city. The corps arrived just before New Year's Eve. The relief attempts were to be codenamed Operation Konrad. The first attack was Konrad I. The plan was for a joint attack by the Wiking and Totenkopf from the town of Tata attacking along the Bicske-Budapest line. The attack was launched on New Year's Day, 1945.

Despite initial gains, Konrad I ran into heavy Red Army opposition near Bicske and during the battle the 1st Battalion, 3rd SS Panzer Regiment's commander, SS-Sturmbannführer Erwin Meierdress was killed. After the failure of the first operation, Totenkopf and Wiking launched an assault aimed at reaching the city centre. Named Operation Konrad II, the attack was launched on 7 January from just south of Esztergom. It reached as far as Budapest's northern suburbs, by 12 January motorised infantry of the Wiking division spotted the Hungarian capital's skyline. However, Gille's corps was overextended and vulnerable, so it was ordered to fall back.

Operation Konrad III got underway on 20 January 1945. Attacking from the south of Budapest, it aimed at encircling 10 Red Army divisions. However, the relief forces could not achieve their goal, despite making a 24-kilometre bulge in the Soviet forces line and destroying the 135th Rifle Corps. The encircled troops capitulated in mid-February. The division was pulled back to the west, executing a fighting withdrawal from Budapest to the area near Lake Balaton, where the 6th SS Panzer Army under SS-Oberstgruppenführer Josef Dietrich was massing for the upcoming Operation Spring Awakening.

Gille's corps was too depleted to take part in the assault, instead it provided flank support to assaulting divisions during the beginning of the operation. Totenkopf, together with Wiking, performed a holding action on the left flank of the offensive, in the area between Lake Velence-Székesfehérvár. Dietrich's army made "good progress" at first, but as they drew near the Danube, the combination of the muddy terrain and strong Soviet resistance ground them to a halt.

As the offensive stalled, the Soviets forces counterattacked in strength on 16 March. The Germans were driven back to the positions they had held before Operation Spring Awakening began. Attacking the line between the Totenkopf and the Hungarian 2nd Armoured Division, contact was lost between the two formations. The 6th Army commander, General der Panzertruppe Hermann Balck, recommended moving the I SS Panzer Corps north to plug the gap and prevent the encirclement of the IV SS Panzer Corps, however, by the time the divisions finally began moving, it was too late.

On 22 March, the Red Army encirclement of the Totenkopf and Wiking was almost complete. The 9th SS Panzer Division Hohenstaufen held open a route which could be used to withdraw – the Berhida Corridor – and Gille's corps escaped the encirclement. The Red Army then launched the Vienna Offensive which destroyed any resemblance of an organised German line of defence. The remnants of the division retreated into Czechoslovakia where it surrendered to the American forces on 9 May.

== War crimes ==
=== Poland ===
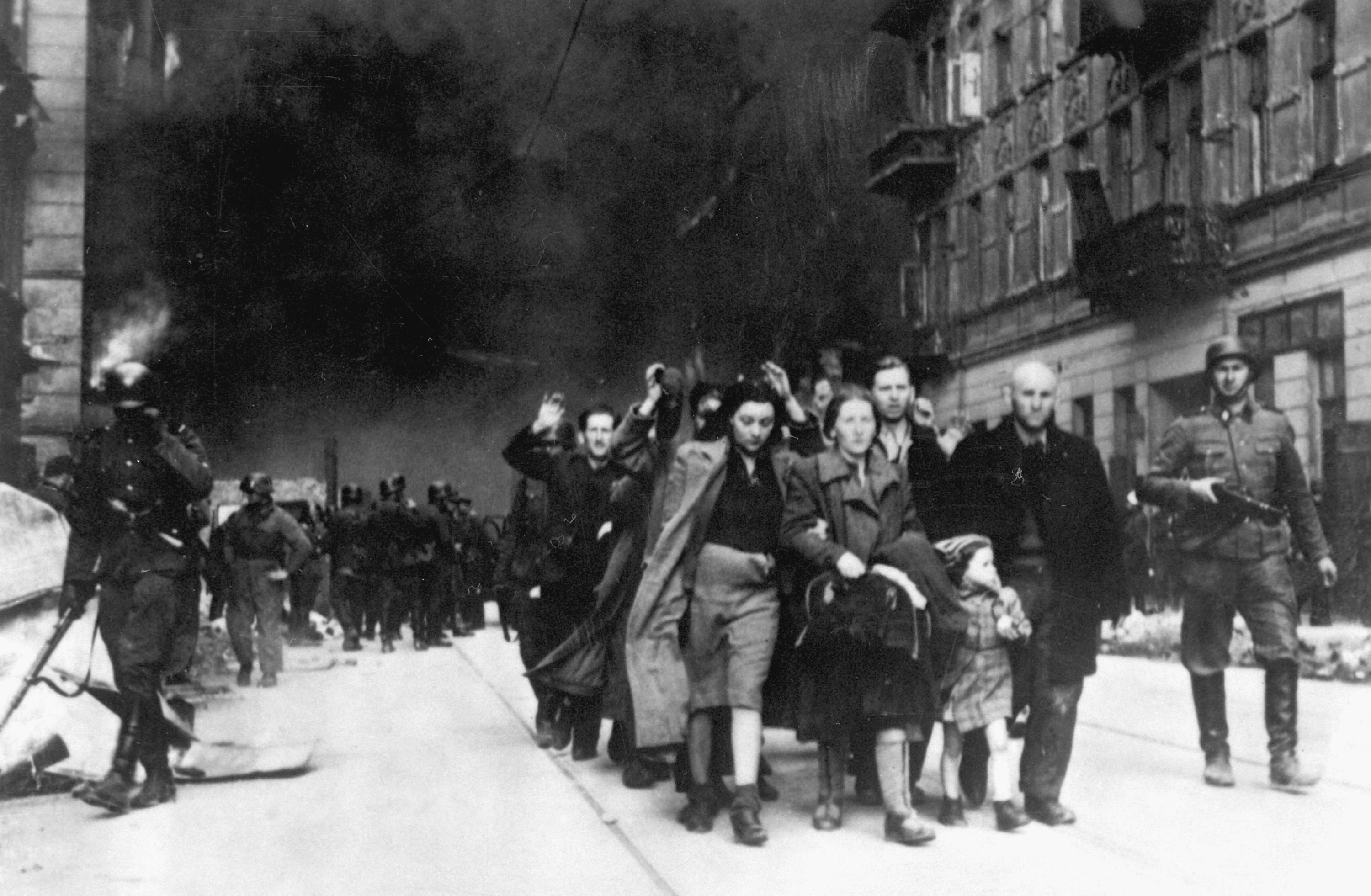
1943 Photograph of Jewish prisoners in the Warsaw Ghetto Uprising.

With the invasion of Poland, Theodor Eicke – who was the commandant of the Dachau concentration camp, inspector of the camps, and murderer of Ernst Röhm – joined the fray with one cavalry and four infantry regiments. Three of his regiments, "Oberbayern", "Brandenburg" and "Thuringen", formed the basis of the first Einsatzgruppen; the Oberbayern and Thuringen (EG II and EG z. B.V) followed the Tenth Army in Upper Silesia; the Brandenburg (EG III) followed the Eight Army across Warthegau. His Totenkopfverbände troops were called on to carry out "police and security measures" in the rear areas. What these measures involved is demonstrated by the record of SS Totenkopf Standarte "Brandenburg". It arrived in Włocławek on 22 September 1939 and embarked on a four-day "Jewish action" that included the burning of synagogues and the execution en masse of the leaders of the Jewish community. On 29 September the Standarte travelled to Bydgoszcz to conduct an "intelligentsia action". The German Intelligenzaktion resulting in the mass murder of approximately 100,000 Poles, was a major step in the implementation of Sonderaktion Tannenberg (Operation Tannenberg a.k.a. Unternehmen Tannenberg) of installing Nazi officials from SiPo, Kripo, Gestapo and SD to head an administrative machine in occupied Poland, leading to the Generalplan Ost colonization programme. In October 1939, these Totenkopfverbände troops formed the core of the 3 Totenkopf Division, of which Eicke became the commander. In April and May 1943, the training battalion of the 3rd Panzer Division Totenkopf took part in the suppression of the Warsaw Ghetto Uprising.

=== France ===
==== Le Paradis Massacre ====
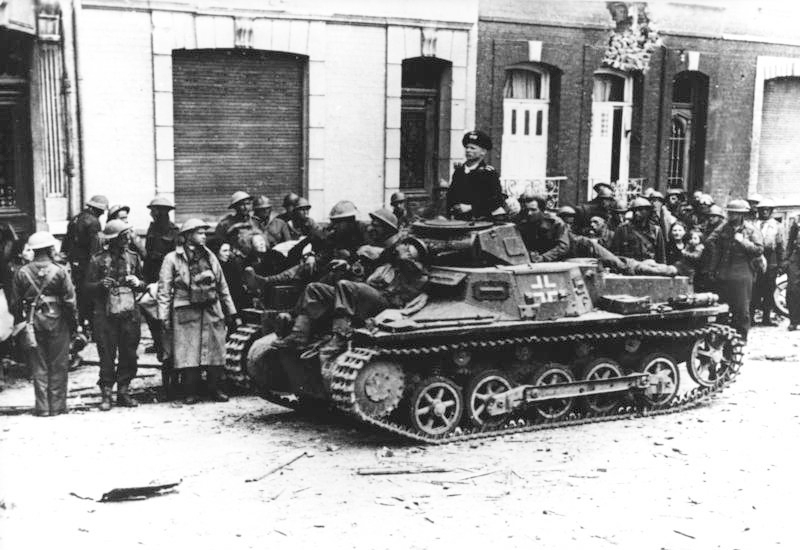
British prisoners of war with a Pz.Kpfw Ib German tank in Calais in May, 1940

While the Totenkopf Division committed numerous massacres of French Arab and African troops, the most infamous remains the murders at Le Paradis. The Le Paradis massacre was a war crime committed by members of the 14th Company, SS Division Totenkopf, under the command of Hauptsturmführer Fritz Knöchlein. It took place on 27 May 1940, during the Battle of France, at a time when the British Expeditionary Force (BEF) was attempting to retreat through the Pas-de-Calais region during the Battle of Dunkirk.

Soldiers of the 2nd Battalion, the Royal Norfolk Regiment, had become isolated from their regiment. They occupied and defended a farmhouse against an attack by Waffen-SS forces in the village of Le Paradis. After running out of ammunition, the defenders surrendered to the German troops. The Germans machine-gunned the men after they surrendered, with survivors killed with bayonets. Two men survived with injuries, and were hidden by locals until they were captured by German forces several days later. After the war, Knöchlein was tried for war crimes by a British military court. He was found guilty, sentenced to death, and executed in 1949.

==== Chasselay massacre ====
Thereafter, the division worked together with Großdeutschland Division to carry out racially motivated murders of hundreds of captured black African members of the French Army. They murdered captured black soldiers on account of their race, which they believed to merit their separation and execution. For example, on 19 and 20 June 1940, Totenkopf and Großdeutschland together carried out a series of massacres of captured African soldiers in the Chasselay area, murdering about 100 captured Senegalese Tirailleurs. They are today buried in the Tata of Chasselay.

== Commanders ==
No.	Portrait	Commander	Took office	Left office	Time in office
1	Theodor Eicke	SS-Gruppenführer; Theodor Eicke (1892–1943)	1 November 1939	7 July 1941	1 year, 248 days
2	Matthias Kleinheisterkamp	SS-Oberführer; Matthias Kleinheisterkamp (1893–1945)	7 July 1941	18 July 1941	11 days
3	Georg Keppler	SS-Brigadeführer; Georg Keppler (1894–1966)	18 July 1941	19 September 1941	63 days
1	Theodor Eicke	SS-Obergruppenführer; Theodor Eicke (1892–1943)	19 September 1941	26 February 1943 †	1 year, 160 days
4	Hermann Priess	SS-Gruppenführer; Hermann Priess (1901–1985)	26 February 1943	27 April 1943	60 days
5	Heinz Lammerding	SS-Gruppenführer; Heinz Lammerding (1905–1971)	27 April 1943	1 May 1943	4 days
4	Hermann Priess	SS-Gruppenführer; Hermann Priess (1901–1985)	1 May 1943	20 June 1944	1 year, 50 days
6	Karl Ullrich	SS-Standartenführer; Karl Ullrich (1910–1996); Acting	20 June 1944	13 July 1944	23 days
7	Hellmuth Becker	SS-Brigadeführer; Hellmuth Becker (1902–1953)	13 July 1944	8 May 1945	311 days

== Organisation ==
The main organisation structure of this SS formation was as follows:

Designation (English)
- SS Panzer Grenadier Regiment 5 "Totenkopf"
- SS Panzer Grenadier Regiment 6 "Theodor Eicke"
- SS Panzer Regiment 3
- SS Panzer Artillery Regiment 3
Designation (German)
- SS-Panzergrenadierregiment 5 "Totenkopf"
- SS-Panzergrenadierregiment 6 "Theodor Eicke"
- SS-Panzerregiment 3
- SS-Panzerartillerieregiment 3

== See also ==
- List of Waffen-SS divisions
- SS Panzer Division order of battle
- Waffen-SS in popular culture
