= Chasselay massacre =

1940 massacre perpetrated by German troops

Coordinates: 45.882°N 4.755°E

- Part of the Battle of France
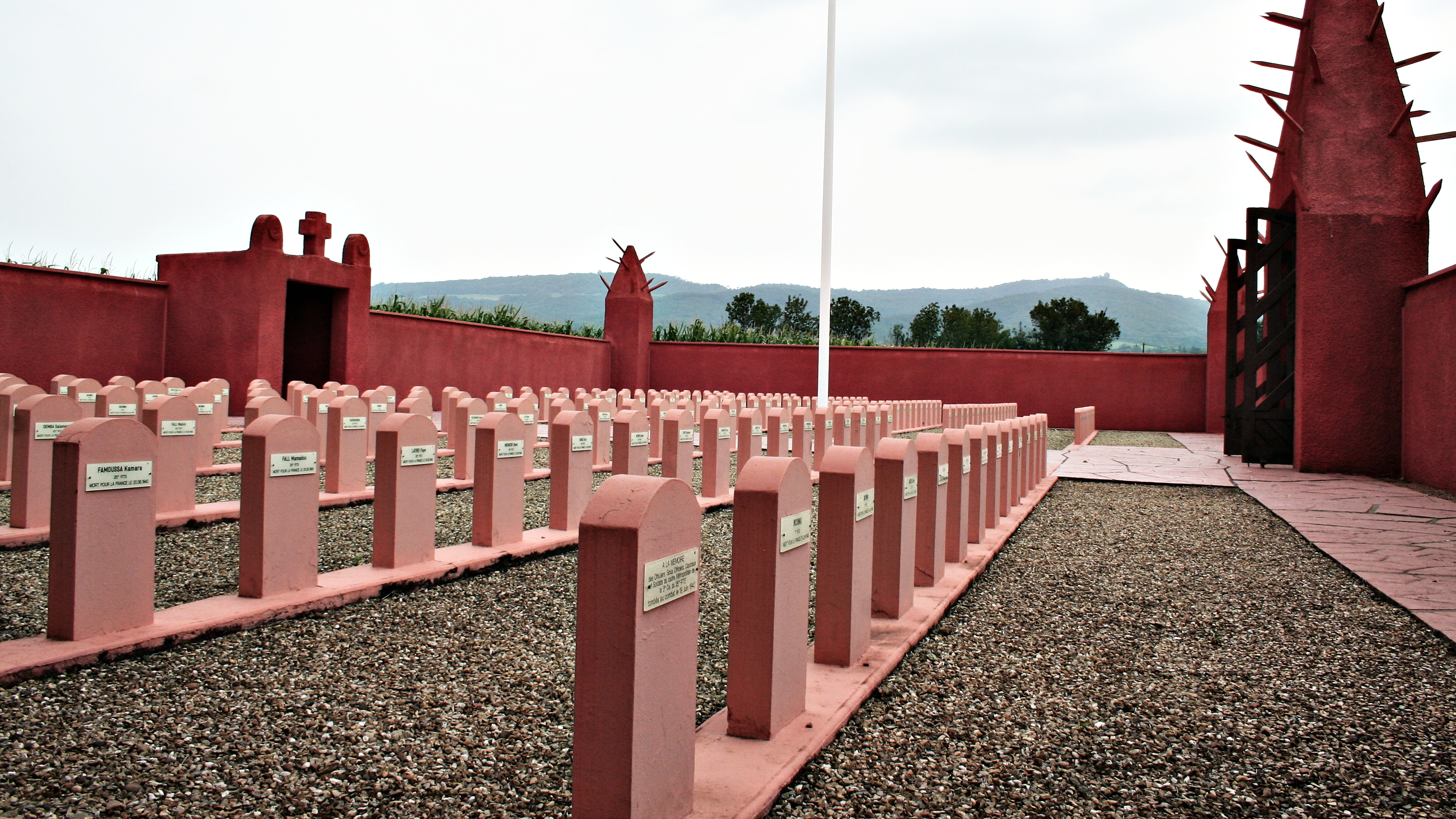
- The graves of the prisoners of war murdered in the massacre
- Location: Near Chasselay, Rhône
- Date: 20 June 1940
- Target: French prisoners of war
- Attack type: Massacre
- Deaths: ~50 men killed
- Perpetrators: German Army; Waffen-SS
- Motive: Nazism

The Chasselay massacre was the mass killing of French prisoners of war by German Army and Waffen-SS soldiers during the Battle of France in World War II. After capturing non-white French POWs during the capture of Lyon on 19 June 1940, German troops took approximately 50 black soldiers to a field near Chasselay, and used two tanks to murder them. After the massacre, local civilians buried the dead in a mass grave despite German warnings not to do so. Vichy official Jean-Baptiste Marchiani ordered the construction of a cemetery for the victims, which opened in 1942. It is believed that between 1,500 and 3,000 soldiers from the French colonies were killed in war crimes carried out by the Wehrmacht in 1940.

== Background ==
On 10 May 1940, Nazi Germany launched an invasion of France, eight months after the French declared war on the Germans following the German invasion of Poland that sparked World War II. German forces rapidly advanced into French territory as part of the Manstein Plan, before initiating the Fall Rot plan on 5 June. The French Armed Forces, which had deployed large numbers of colonial troops (including the Senegalese Tirailleurs) in Metropolitan France, was quickly overwhelmed and forced to retreat.

In May 1940, as German troops captured territory in the Somme region, numerous French prisoners of war, including non-white soldiers from France's African colonies, fell into their hands. German soldiers, many of whom remembered the racist Black Horror on the Rhine moral panic and were angered by suffering casualties at the hands of a supposedly "inferior" race, started to carry out massacres of non-white French POWs. The high command of the German armed forces, the Oberkommando der Wehrmacht, had not specifically issued any order to mistreat captured colonial troops, but did nothing to stop these massacres.

== Massacre ==
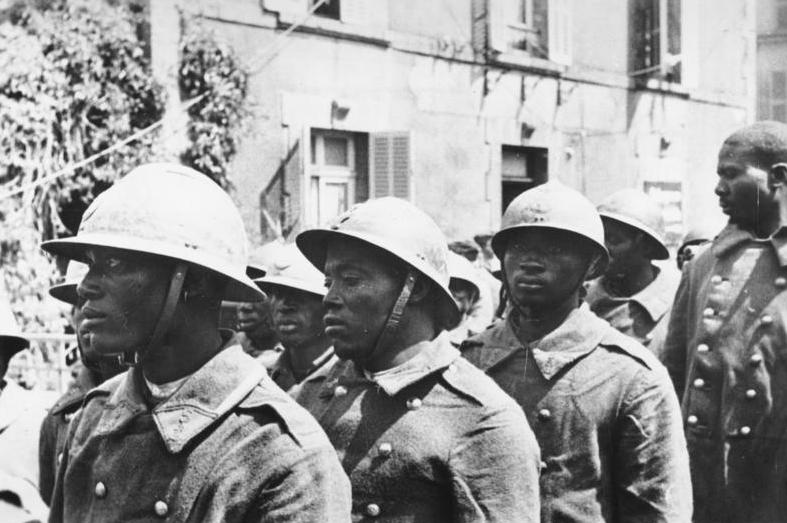
Black French prisoners of war in German custody, May 1940

On 17 June, Marshal Philippe Pétain issued an announcement that he would seek an armistice with Nazi Germany, while German forces continued to rapidly overrun remaining French resistance. Two days later, a German force consisting of soldiers from the Großdeutschland Division and 3rd SS Panzer Division attacked the city of Lyon. Among the French defenders was the 25th Senegalese Tirailleurs Regiment, which had been stationed north-west of the city to defend against the Germans. As the Germans gradually captured French positions, several captured soldiers were summarily executed.

By 20 June, despite facing unexpectedly heavy resistance, German forces had eliminated all pockets of French resistance, occupying Lyon. The 25th Regiment, which had occupied the small village of Chasselay, surrendered after running out of ammunition. The Germans subsequently rounded up all French prisoners of war, dividing the colonial and non-colonial POWs into two groups. The colonial POWs, consisting of Black soldiers and their white officers, were forcibly moved by German troops down an isolated road to a nearby field.

After they had arrived at the field, the white French officers were led aside and told to lie face down. The black soldiers were ordered to assemble in front of two German tanks which had escorted them to the field, before being told to run away. As the soldiers began to do so, the tanks opened fire on them with their machine guns, before driving over the dead and wounded. During the massacre, a German soldier walked over to a French officer and shot the man, wounding him; otherwise the white French POWs were left mostly unharmed. Approximately 50 black soldiers were murdered by the Germans in the massacre.

== Aftermath ==
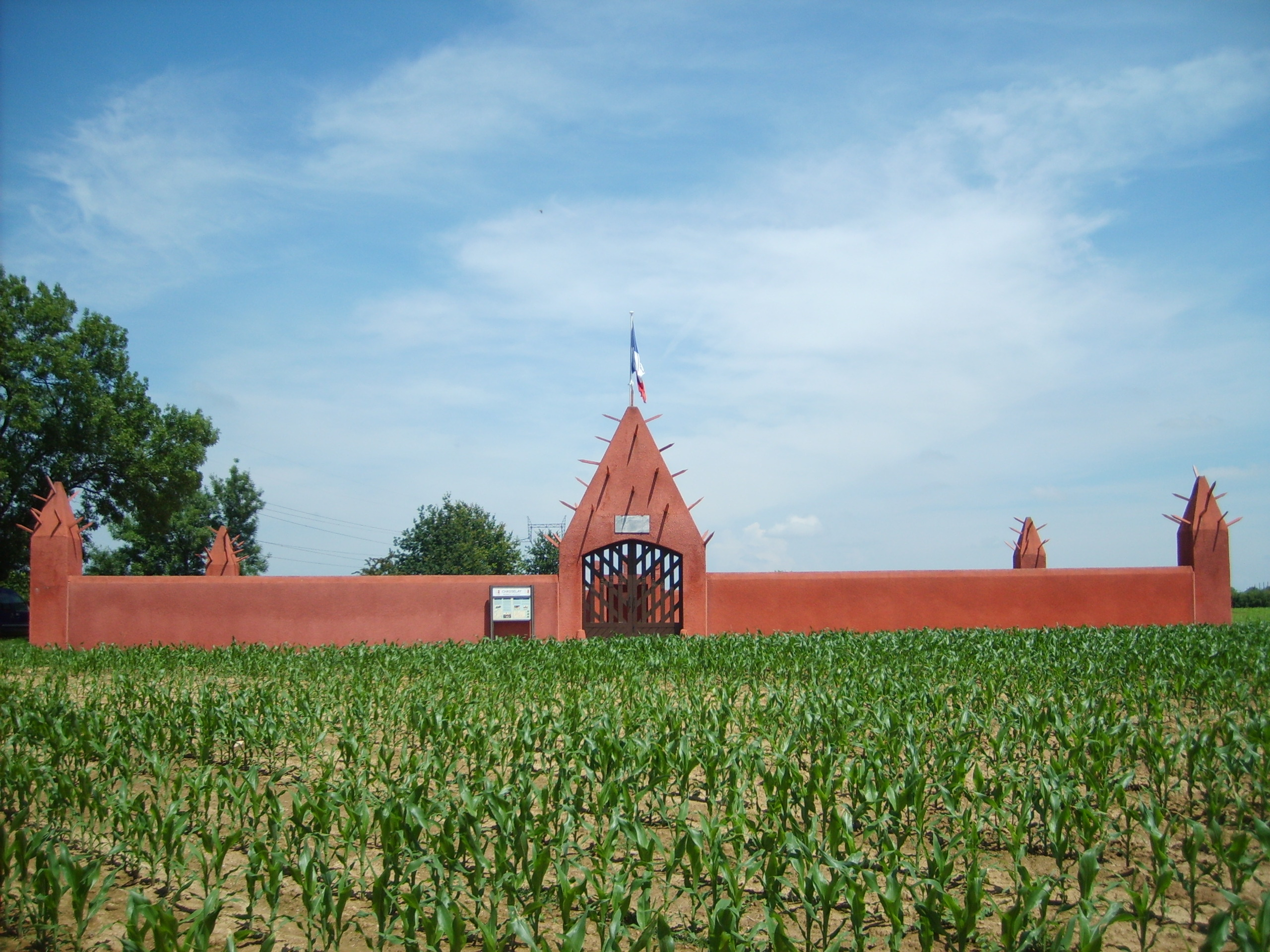
The Tata of Chasselay in France.

The French prisoners of war who managed to survive capture were sent by the Germans to prisoner-of-war camps. White POWs were sent to camps in Germany, but non-white prisoners remained in France, as the German authorities did not want them to contaminate the "racial purity" of Germany. After the massacre, German officers warned nearby French civilians not to bury the murdered soldiers, with one notice stating that "The German Army Command does not like, and expressly prohibits, the decoration of the graves of black soldiers". Despite this, local civilians buried them in a mass grave.

After the French surrendered on 25 June, the collaborationist Vichy regime was established, controlling the south-east of France. A Vichy official, Jean-Baptiste Marchiani, took an interest in the massacre. In the summer of 1940, he requested the establishment of a cemetery for the deceased soldiers, built in a West African style with red ochre. Though Marchiani was at first "faced with polite indifference", his suggestions that the cemetery's construction would show the Vichy regime's attachment to the French colonial empire eventually convinced his superiors.

On 8 November 1942, the cemetery was completed and inaugurated by Vichy officials, with a Senegalese imam dedicating the structure. The bodies of 188 black soldiers found in the region were buried there. Vichy officials present "carefully avoided any mention of the massacres", instead claiming that they were killed in action. After the liberation of France in 1944, black French troops visited the cemetery on 24 September to pay their respects; after the war's end in 1945, an annual ceremony has taken place at the cemetery. As of 2020, the majority of the murdered soldiers in the cemetery remained unidentified.

== See also ==
- Bois d'Eraine massacre - Another massacre of captured Senegalese Tirailleurs by German troops on 11 June 1940.
- Le Paradis massacre - Massacre of British prisoners of war by German troops on 27 May 1940.
- Wormhoudt massacre - Massacre of British and French prisoners of war by German troops on 28 May 1940.
- Oignies and Courrières massacre - Massacre of French and Belgian civilians by German troops on 28 May 1940.
- Vinkt massacre - Massacre of Belgian civilians by German troops from 26-28 May 1940.
- Wereth Massacre, the torture and killing of 11 black U.S. prisoners of war in Wereth, committed by the 1st SS Panzer Division on the same day of the Malmedy Massacre.
- War crimes of the Wehrmacht
