= Fritz Knöchlein =

SS commander (1911–1949)

- Born: 27 May 1911; Munich, Kingdom of Bavaria, German Empire
- Died: 21 January 1949 (aged 37); Hamelin Prison, Allied-occupied Germany
- Military career
- Allegiance: Nazi Germany
- Branch: Waffen SS
- Rank: Obersturmbannführer
- Service number: NSDAP #157,016; SS #87,881
- Commands: SS Division Totenkopf; SS Division Reichsführer-SS
- Conflicts: World War II
- Awards: Knight's Cross of the Iron Cross
- Criminal information
- Known for: Le Paradis massacre
- Status: Executed by hanging
- Conviction: War crimes
- Penalty: Death

Fritz Knöchlein (27 May 1911 – 21 January 1949) was a German SS commander during World War II. He was tried, convicted, and executed in 1949 for war crimes, specifically his responsibility for the 1940 Le Paradis massacre which took place on his 29th birthday.

== Le Paradis Massacre ==
He gained notoriety in his capacity as an SS company commander, being responsible for the 27 May 1940 massacre of British prisoners-of-war at Le Paradis in the Pas-de-Calais. Ninety-nine members of the 2nd Battalion of the Royal Norfolk Regiment, who had surrendered to his unit in a cattle shed, were stood in front of the barn wall, and Knöchlein ordered two machine-guns turned on them, followed by bayoneting and shooting any apparent survivors. Two of the prisoners, privates Albert Pooley and William O'Callaghan, managed to escape the massacre, but the remaining 97 were hastily buried along the barn wall. According to the historians Williamson Murray and Allan Millett: "The company commander, Hauptsturmführer (Captain) Fritz Knochlein, lined the prisoners up against a barn wall and machinegunned the lot. Any survivors were bayoneted and shot. German military authorities brought no charges against Knochlein."

In 1942, the bodies were exhumed by the French authorities and reburied in a local cemetery, which eventually became the Le Paradis War Cemetery. Albert Pooley, who was subsequently taken prisoner along with O'Callaghan, made it a personal mission to hunt down Knöchlein and have him charged for war crimes. His story was confirmed when O'Callaghan was freed in 1945.

== Trial and execution ==
In August 1948, Knöchlein was formally charged with committing a war crime, to which he pleaded not guilty.

The accused Fritz Knöchlein, a German national, in the charge of the Hamburg Garrison Unit, pursuant to Regulation 4 of the Regulations for the Trial of War Criminals, is charged with committing a war crime in that he in the vicinity of Paradis, Pas-de-Calais, France, on or about 27 May 1940, in violation of the laws and usages of war, was concerned in the killing of about ninety prisoners-of-war, members of The Royal Norfolk Regiment and other British Units.

His trial began on Monday 11 October 1948 in Rotherbaum, and both Albert Pooley and William O'Callaghan were called to testify against him. Knöchlein's defence attorney claimed that Knöchlein had not been present on the day of the battle, and that the British forces had used illegal dum-dum bullets during the battle.

Upon being found guilty, Knöchlein asked for leniency, saying he had a wife and four children, who depended on him. He was sentenced to death, and hanged at Hamelin Prison on 21 January 1949 by executioner Albert Pierrepoint and his assistant.

== Awards ==
- German Cross in Gold on 15 November 1942
- Knight's Cross of the Iron Cross on 16 November 1944
