= Guy Lassausaie =

French chef

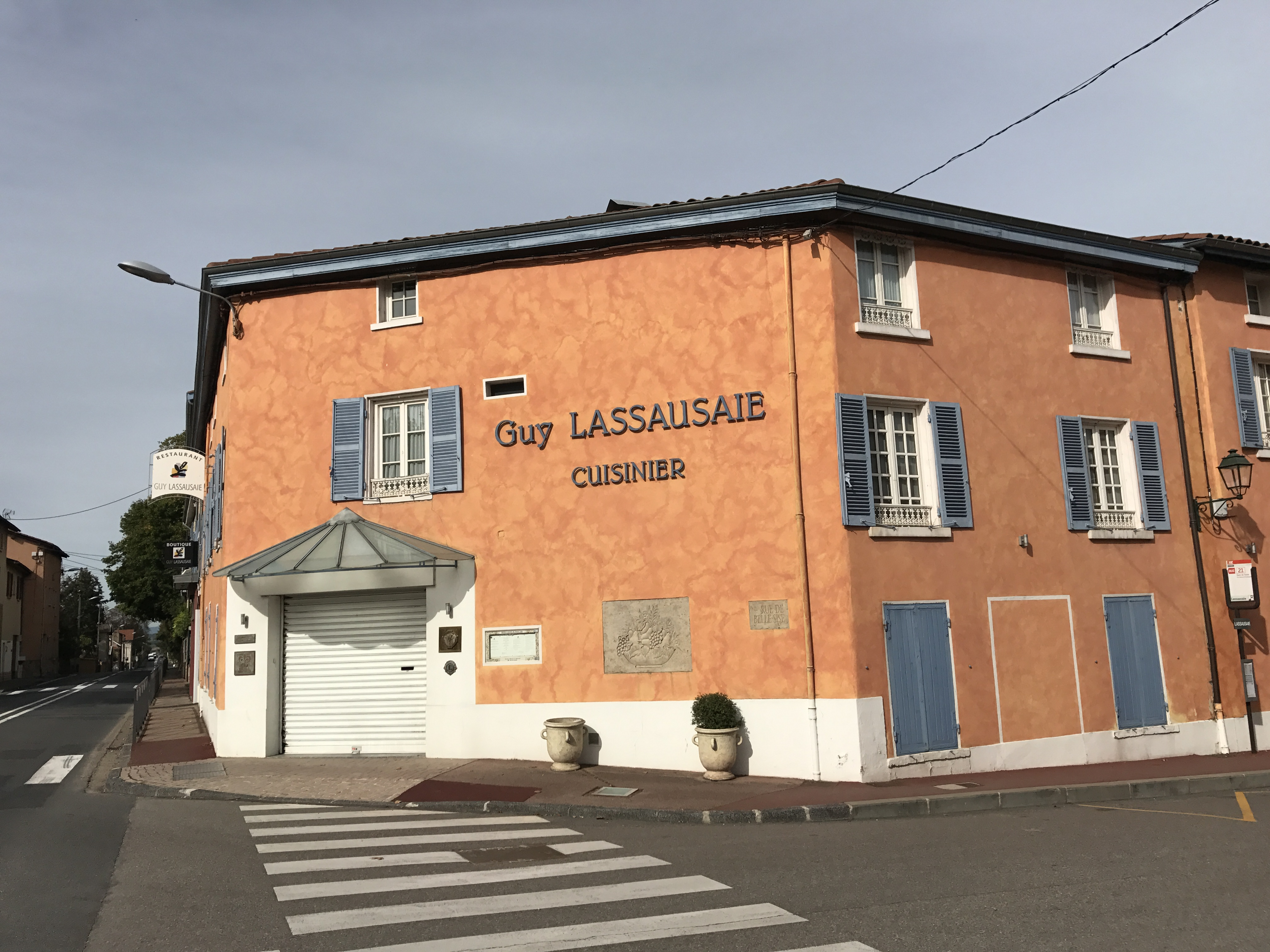
- Restaurant Lassausaie in Chasselay
- Born: March 9, 1961; Chasselay, Rhône, France
- Culinary career
- Rating(s): Michelin stars Meilleur Ouvrier de France (1993)
- Current restaurant(s): Restaurant Lassausaie
- Website: http://www.guy-lassausaie.com

Guy Lassausaie (birth 9 March 1961) is a French chef based in Chasselay, Rhône, France. His restaurant has one Michelin star. He was awarded as Meilleur Ouvrier de France in 1993.
