= Tata of Chasselay =

Cemetery in Rhone, France

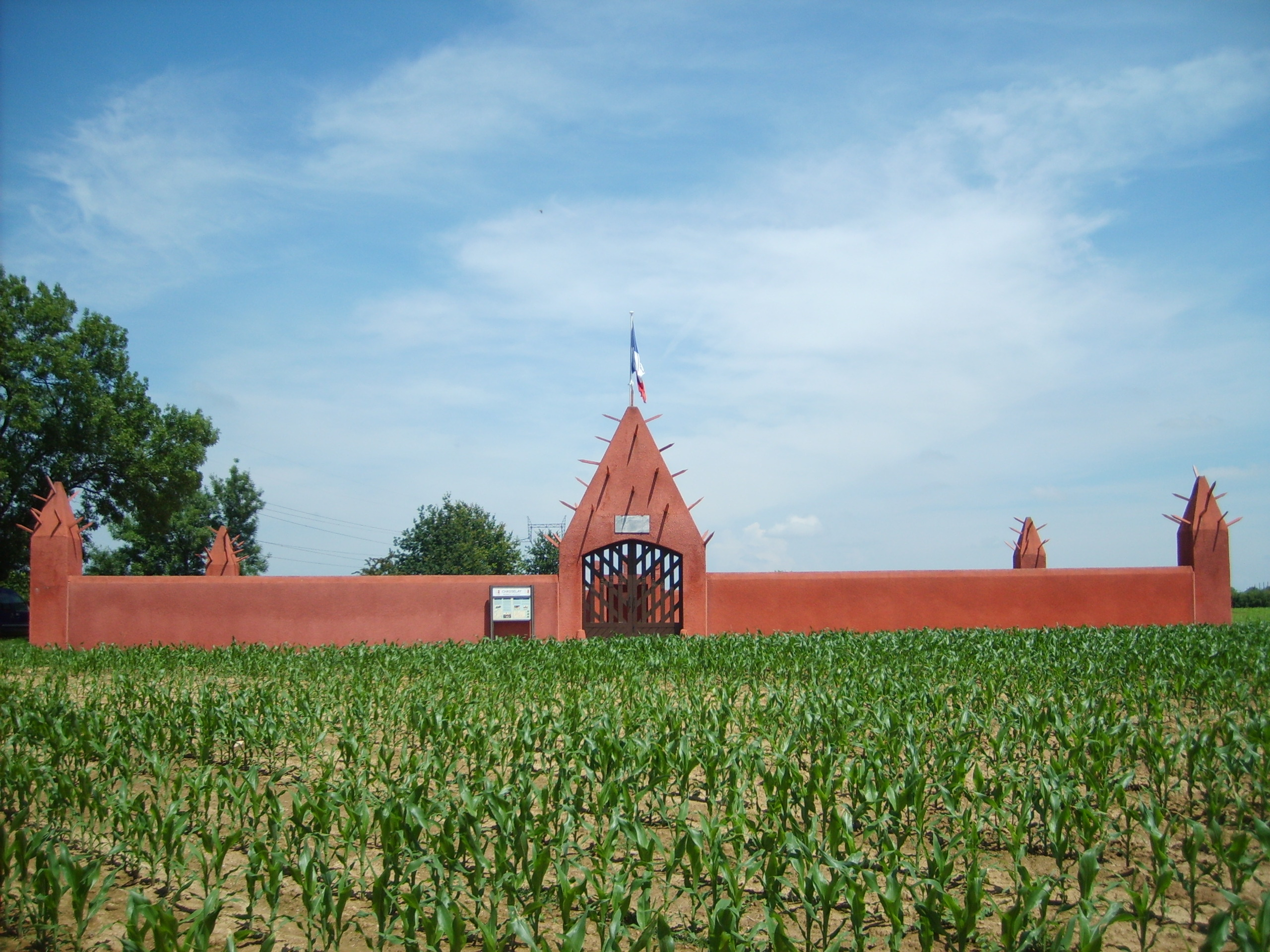
- Interactive map of Tata of Chasselay

Details
- Established: 1942
- Location: Chasselay, Rhône
- Country: France
- Coordinates: 45.8823°N 4.75472°E
- Type: Public
- No. of interments: 196

Tata of Chasselay (French: Tata sénégalais de Chasselay) is a cemetery in the city of Chasselay, Rhône including almost 200 graves of Senegalese Tirailleurs murdered during the Chasselay massacre of World War II.

== History ==
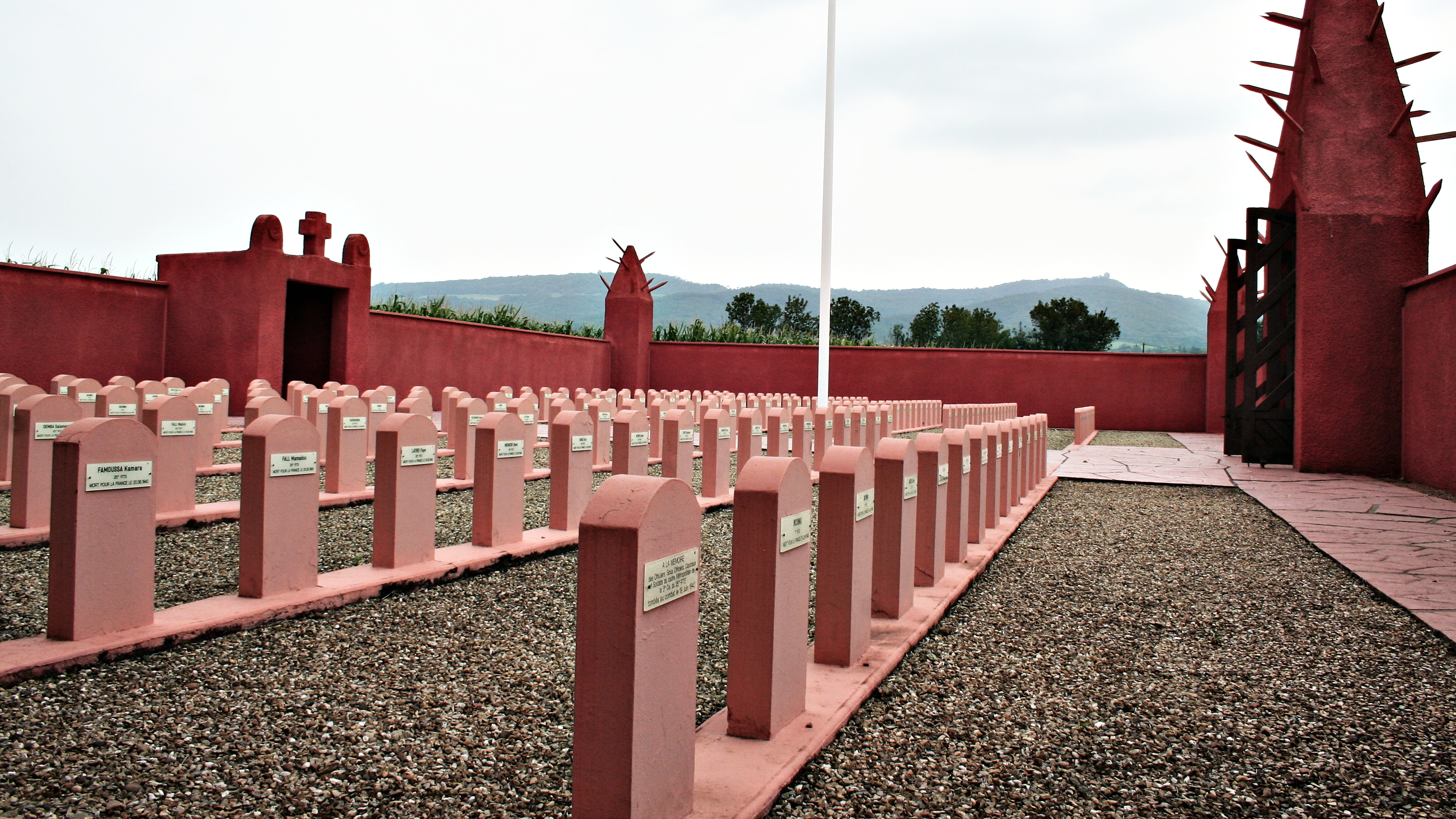
The graveyard in the cemetery

From 19 to 20 June 1940, French troops delayed the entry of German forces into Lyon, which had been declared an "open city" on 18 June. Earlier on 17 June, French troops occupied Chasselay, a village roughly fifteen kilometres north-west of Lyon. Soldiers from the 405th Anti-Aircraft Artillery Regiment, 25th Senegalese Tirailleurs Regiment and the French Foreign Legion erected barricades in the village with the help of local civilians. Having encountered little resistance during the capture of Dijon, German troops arrived on June 19, near Lissieu. However, the Germans met with strong resistance from the defenders of Chasselay, resulting in 50 troops killed overall along with one French civilian; more than 40 German soldiers were wounded. When the 25th Regiment surrendered, they were taken to a nearby field. The white officers were led aside and told to lie face down. Then, the Black soldiers were then ordered to assemble in front of two German tanks and told to run away. As they ran, the tanks opened fire on the soldiers with machine guns, and then drove over the dead and wounded. A German soldier then walked over to one of the white French officers and shot and wounded him; but otherwise they were left unharmed.

German officers specifically ordered French civilians living nearby not to bury the murdered soldiers, but instead to let them rot in the open. However, the civilians, who also sheltered a handful of Black soldiers who managed to escape, buried the bodies in a mass grave overnight. After the armistice, Chasselay was controlled by Vichy France. Accordingly, it was not subject to the general rule in occupied France that no memorial might be erected to black soldiers. Jean Marchiani, who held the position of General Secretary of the Departmental Office of disabled ex-servicemen, veterans and victims of war heard about the massacre. He decided to bring together the bodies of the African soldiers, some of whom were buried in local cemeteries while others were often simply left to lay in ditches in the middle of the countryside. After identifying the villages where bodies were buried, Jean Marchiani bought a plot of land in Chasselay, near the locality of Vide-Sac where roughly 50 Black prisoners were shot by the Germans, and raised funds for the erection of the cemetery. He was backed by General Doyen, former commander of the Army of the Alps, and Deputy of Senegal Calendou Diouf. The inauguration took place on 8 November 1942, three days before the invasion of the unoccupied zone by the Germans.

== Description ==
The building, entirely red ochre, consists of tombstones surrounded by a rectangular enclosure 2.8 metres high. Its porch and its four corners are surmounted by pyramids covered with piles. The solid oak clerestory gate is decorated with eight African masks.

Dirt from Dakar has been brought by plane, to mix it with French soil.

== See also ==
- Tata (fortification)
