= Chasselay, Rhône =

Chasselay
- Commune
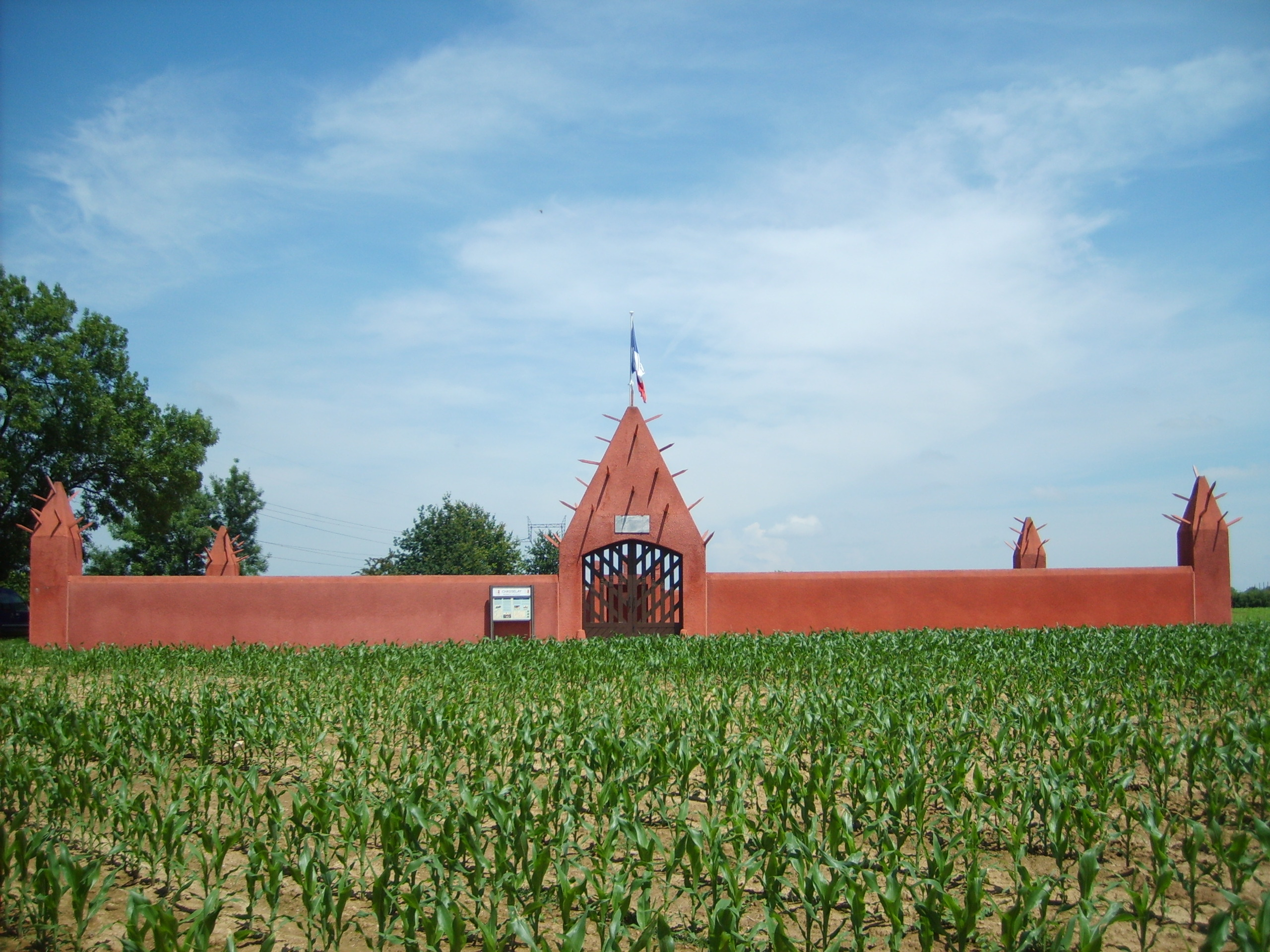
- The Tata of Chasselay

- Coat of arms
- Location of Chasselay
- Location within France Location within Auvergne-Rhône-Alpes
- Coordinates: 45°52′31″N 4°46′23″E
- Country: France
- Region: Auvergne-Rhône-Alpes
- Department: Rhône
- Arrondissement: Villefranche-sur-Saône
- Canton: Anse
- Intercommunality: CC Beaujolais Pierres Dorées

Government
  - Mayor (2020–2026): Jacques Pariost
- Area^{1}: 12.78 km^{2} (4.93 sq mi)
- Elevation: 200 m (660 ft)
- Highest elevation: 524 m (1,719 ft)
- Lowest elevation: 189 m (620 ft)
- Population (2023): 2,973
  - Density: 232.6/km^{2} (602.5/sq mi)
- Time zone: UTC+01:00 (CET)
  - Summer (DST): UTC+02:00 (CEST)
- INSEE/Postal code: 69049 /69380
- ^{1} French Land Register data, which excludes lakes, ponds, glaciers > 1 km^{2} (0.386 sq mi or 247 acres) and river estuaries.

Chasselay (French pronunciation: [ʃaslɛ]) is a commune in the Rhône department in eastern France. The village is located between Lyon and Villefranche-sur-Saône. It is a relatively rural community without a train station.

== History ==
During World War II, on 20 June 1940, the German Army and Waffen-SS committed the Chasselay massacre, killing some 50 prisoners of war.

== Population ==
Historical population
Year	Pop.	±% p.a.
1968	1,169	—
1975	1,438	+3.00%
1982	1,708	+2.49%
1990	2,002	+2.01%
1999	2,590	+2.90%
2007	2,691	+0.48%
2012	2,687	−0.03%
2017	2,784	+0.71%
2023	2,973	+1.10%
Source: INSEE

== Main sights ==
- Tata of Chasselay

== Sports ==
- GOAL FC football team based in Chasselay

== Notable people ==
- Guy Lassausaie, chef

== See also ==
- Communes of the Rhône department
