= Le Paradis massacre =

WWII war crime by Nazi SS soldiers in France

Coordinates: 50°35′42″N 2°38′52″E

- Location: Le Paradis hamlet, commune of Lestrem, northern France
- Date: 27 May 1940
- Target: POWs of the 2nd Battalion Royal Norfolk Regiment
- Attack type: Massacre
- Deaths: 97
- Injuries: 2
- Perpetrators: 14th Company, 3rd SS Division Totenkopf: SS-Hauptsturmführer Fritz Knöchlein

The Le Paradis massacre was a World War II war crime committed by members of the 14th Company, SS Division Totenkopf, under the command of Hauptsturmführer Fritz Knöchlein. It took place on 27 May 1940, during the Battle of France, at a time when troops of the British Expeditionary Force (BEF) were attempting to retreat through the Pas-de-Calais region during the Battle of Dunkirk.

Soldiers of the 2nd Battalion, the Royal Norfolk Regiment, had become isolated from their unit. They occupied and defended a farmhouse against an attack by Waffen-SS forces in the hamlet of Le Paradis. After running out of ammunition, the defenders surrendered to the German troops. The Germans led them across the road to a wall where they were murdered by machine guns. Ninety-seven British troops were killed. Two survived with injuries and hid until they were captured by German forces several days later.

After the war, Knöchlein was convicted of his role in the massacre by a British military court, with the two survivors acting as witnesses against him. For ordering the massacre, Knöchlein was sentenced to death and was executed in 1949.

== Background ==
The German invasion of France through the Low Countries began on 10 May 1940. Army Group A fought its way through southern Belgium and north-eastern France. German forces pushed the French Army and the British Expeditionary Force (BEF) to the Meuse on 12 May, crossing it that evening. From there, the German forces rapidly advanced to the English Channel over the course of the next week. The 2nd Infantry Division, which included within the 4th Infantry Brigade battalions of the Royal Norfolks and Royal Scots, were ordered to try to slow the German advance in northern France to buy time to evacuate troops at Dunkirk.

One of the participating German units, the 3rd SS Division Totenkopf, had been strongly indoctrinated with the Nazi Party ideology by its commander, Theodor Eicke. Eicke's men were fanatically loyal to him and to Germany. The men of Totenkopf fought fiercely throughout the campaign, suffering higher death rates than other German forces.

The Battle of France was SS Division Totenkopf's first major engagement of the Second World War. The division, part of the reserves of Army Group A, was called to the front line on 17 May. The unit was engaged in "mopping up" operations against Allied forces to the north and east of Cambrai. In total the division took 16,000 prisoners, but on 19 May they refused to accept the surrender of 200 soldiers of the French Army of Africa, killing them on the spot.

By the time the operation in Cambrai had finished, the first German units had reached the English Channel, but the British counter-attacked just west of Arras on 21 May, following on from the counter-attack of the day before (Battle of Arras). The Totenkopf division suffered casualties of just under 100 men in repelling the assault. The Totenkopf was then ordered to the town of Béthune and crossed the La Bassée river under British fire on 24 May. However, the division was ordered to retreat the next day to preserve tanks for the upcoming campaign in Dunkirk and to allow the Luftwaffe to attack Allied positions in the area. It thus had to make the hazardous crossing again on the night of 26 May, and took Béthune after heavy house-to-house fighting with the British, who withdrew to a line between Locon and Le Paradis.

The 2nd Battalion of the Royal Norfolks, along with the 8th Lancashire Fusiliers (the third battalion of the 4th Inf Brigade since 4 May) were holding the Allied line at the villages of Riez du Vinage, Le Cornet Malo and Le Paradis, with the battalion headquarters based at Le Paradis. The battalions had been ordered to hold out for as long as possible against the Germans to give time for the BEF to evacuate from Dunkirk.

The SS Division Totenkopf emerged from the Bois de Paqueaut wood and attacked Le Cornet Malo at dawn on 27 May. The British troops defended stubbornly, but were eventually overrun. The attack resulted in the deaths of four German officers and 150 men. Another 480 men and 18 officers were wounded. Later the same day, the German troops moved forward to attack Le Paradis.

=== Battle of Le Paradis ===
The farmhouse where the survivors of the Royal Norfolks surrendered

After the engagement at Le Cornet Malo, C Company and HQ Company of the 2nd Royal Norfolks had fallen back to their headquarters at Cornet Farm, just outside Le Paradis. The company commanders had been informed by radio that their units were isolated and would receive no assistance. They therefore dug in around the farmhouse, which lay on the 506 Chemin du Paradis, the boundary between the Royal Norfolk Regiment and the adjacent 1st Royal Scots. The Norfolks' last contact with brigade headquarters at L'Epinette was at 11:30, but despite a lack of support and heavy opposition, the defenders held out against the 14th Company, 1st Battalion of the 2nd SS Infantry Regiment until 17:15, when they ran out of ammunition. During the battle, the Germans attacked the farmhouse with mortars, tanks and artillery shelling, which destroyed the building and forced the defenders to relocate to a cowshed. SS-Standartenführer Hans Friedemann Götze, commander of the Totenkopf Division's third regiment, was killed in the fighting.

The 99 surviving defenders of the 2nd Norfolks were eventually ordered by their commander, Major Lisle Ryder, the brother of Robert Edward Dudley Ryder, to surrender. They exited the cowshed under a white flag. As the boundary between the two British regiments was the road, Ryder's men surrendered not to the company they had been fighting, but rather to SS-Hauptsturmführer Fritz Knöchlein's unit, which had been fighting the Royal Scots. Graves found near Le Paradis in 2007 suggest that around 20 men of the Royal Scots who surrendered to an SS unit may also have been killed in a separate massacre.

== Massacre ==
The British captives, a majority of whom were wounded, were disarmed and marched down a road off the Rue du Paradis. While they were waiting, two machine guns from No. 4 Machine-gun Company were prepared and set up by a barn in a paddock of the farm. The British prisoners were marched to the barn, lined up alongside it and shot by the two German machinegunners, who continued firing until all the British had fallen. Knöchlein then armed his men with bayonets to kill any remaining survivors. Satisfied that they had killed them all, the German soldiers left to rejoin the rest of their regiment.

An account by Private Albert Pooley, one of only two survivors:

... we turned off the dusty French road, through a gateway and into a meadow beside the buildings of a farm. I saw with one of the nastiest feelings I have ever had in my life two heavy machine guns inside the meadow ... pointing at the head of our column. The guns began to spit fire ... for a few seconds the cries and shrieks of our stricken men drowned the crackling of the guns. Men fell like grass before a scythe ... I felt a searing pain and pitched forward ... my scream of pain mingled with the cries of my mates, but even before I fell into the heap of dying men, the thought stabbed my brain 'If I ever get out of here, the swine that did this will pay for it.'

Ninety-seven British prisoners were killed and the Germans forced French civilians to bury the bodies in a shallow mass grave the next day. Despite the German efforts, Private William O'Callaghan had survived and pulled Private Albert Pooley alive from among the bodies in the field. The pair then hid in a pig-sty for three days and nights, surviving on raw potatoes and water from puddles before being discovered by the farm's owner, Madame Duquenne-Creton, and her son Victor. The French civilians risked their lives caring for the two men, who were later captured by the German Army's 251st Infantry Division and transferred to a military hospital.

== Aftermath ==
On the day after the massacre, 28 May, Gunter d'Alquen, a journalist in the Waffen-SS, arrived at the scene with Thum, the SS-Totenkopf deputy legal advisor. D'Alquen made a report of what he saw:

It was possible to look into the back yard from the road ... the corpses in British uniform were lying in the yard near the buildings. They were lying in such a position that one can assume they were killed by machine-gun bursts. It struck me at once that the dead soldiers were not wearing helmets, nor did they have any equipment on them ... I took pictures of the dead bodies, and the whole farm. At Thum's request these were to be placed at the disposal of the division ... I believe I was already sitting there in the vehicle when Thum ... told me that in the field, from which he had just returned, the equipment taken from the shot British soldiers was lying in a heap, from which he had come to the conclusion that a summary trial had taken place.

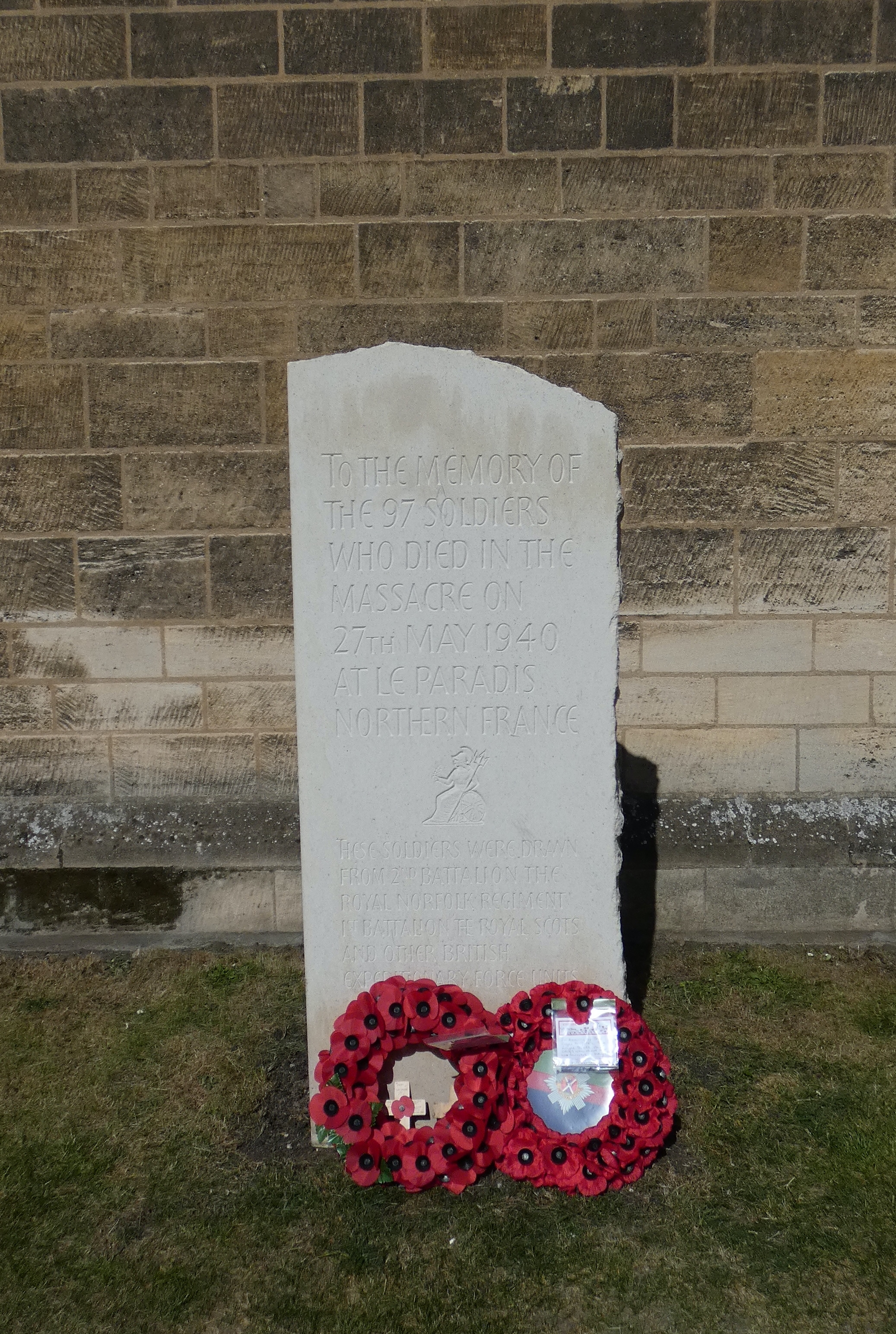
A memorial to the Le Paradis massacre was dedicated on 13 July 2021 at Norwich Cathedral by HRH The Princess Royal. The inscription reads: 'to the memory of the 97 soldiers who died in the massacre on 27 May 1940 at Le Paradis, Northern France [badge of the Royal Norfolk Regiment] These soldiers were drawn from the 2nd Battalion The Royal Norfolk Regiment, 1st Battalion The Royal Scots and other British Expeditionary Force units'.

Major Friedkerr von Riedner, who was also at the scene of the massacre on that day, reported that "These people had almost all suffered head wounds from shots that must have been fired at close range. Some had their whole skull smashed in, an injury that can almost only be caused by a blow from a gun butt or similar means."

News of the massacre spread to neighbouring German divisions, eventually reaching General Erich Hoepner, commander of the German forces in France. He disliked the SS, especially Eicke, and was determined to have him dismissed if charges of mistreatment or murdering of prisoners could be brought. However, none of these investigations were ever successful. Regardless, many SS officers were appalled by the massacre; some reportedly challenged Knöchlein to a duel, although none was ever fought.

The Allies received no information about the massacre until the summer of 1943, when Pooley, who had spent the previous three years in a German hospital due to the injuries he had suffered in the massacre, was declared medically unfit and repatriated. British authorities did not believe Pooley's story on his arrival; it was not thought that the German army were capable of such atrocities against British troops. Private O'Callaghan did not return to the United Kingdom until 1945, after the liberation of his prisoner-of-war camp. His confirmation of Pooley's story prompted an official investigation.

The bodies of those killed in the massacre were exhumed in 1942 by the French, but only about 50 of the 97 were identified. The bodies were then reburied in Le Paradis churchyard, which now forms part of the Le Paradis War Cemetery administered by the Commonwealth War Graves Commission. In 1970, a memorial plaque was placed on the barn wall where the massacre took place and a large memorial was subsequently erected beside the church. In 2021 a memorial stone was erected at Norwich Cathedral in Norfolk to commemorate the men killed in the massacre.

== Trial of Knöchlein ==
After the war, O'Callaghan's evidence and the discovery of the SS-run extermination camps prompted the British authorities to look into the reports. The British War Crimes Investigation Unit, led by Lieutenant Colonel A.P. Scotland, carried out a two-year probe, tracking down and interviewing witnesses to uncover the events. These included the survivors, French civilians and police, and SS prisoners-of-war. After Knöchlein's company was identified as the perpetrators in 1947, he was traced and arrested in Germany. Knöchlein was arraigned on charges of war crimes in August 1948, to which he pleaded not guilty:

The accused Fritz Knöchlein, a German national, in the charge of the Hamburg Garrison Unit, pursuant to Regulation 4 of the Regulations for the Trial of War Criminals, is charged with committing a war crime in that he in the vicinity of Paradis, Pas-de-Calais, France, on or about 27 May 1940, in violation of the laws and usages of war, was concerned in the killing of about ninety prisoners-of-war, members of The Royal Norfolk Regiment and other British Units.

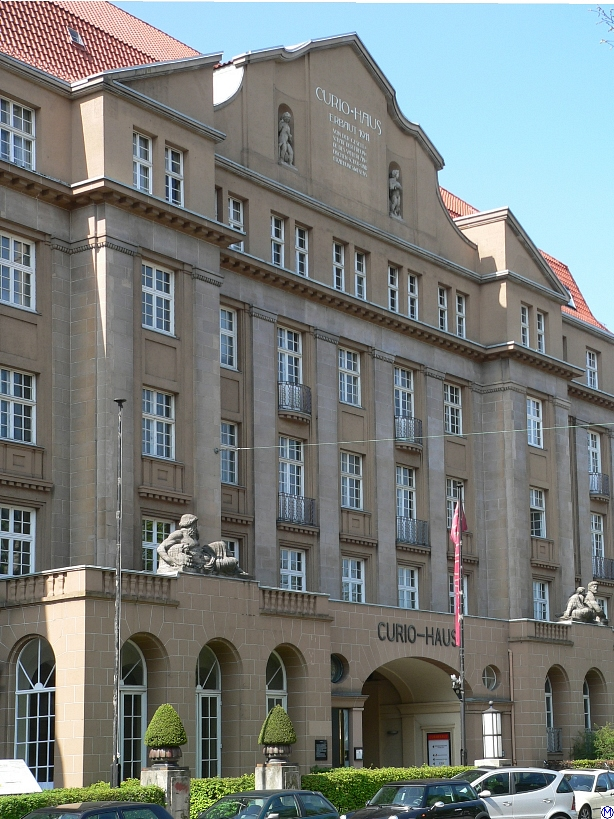
Front view of the Curiohaus in Rotherbaum, Hamburg

He was tried before the Curiohaus War Crimes Court in Rotherbaum, in Court Number 5 on Monday, 11 October 1948. Evidence gathered by the War Crimes Investigation Unit was presented to the court. Evidence was given by Pooley, O'Callaghan, Madame Duquenne-Creton, and a French civilian who testified to recognising Knöchlein. Knöchlein's defence hinged on the claim that he was not present at the massacre, although his lawyers did not deny that the event took place. They also claimed that the British had used dumdum bullets during the battle and misused a flag of truce; all of which were vigorously denied by the prosecution.

On the twelfth day of the trial, during his summation, the Judge-Advocate said that whether the British had used illegal ammunition or abused a flag of truce was irrelevant; the German troops still had absolutely no right to execute prisoners of war without a fair and proper trial. On 25 October at 11:30, the president of the court pronounced the verdict that the defendant had been found guilty of war crimes. His lawyer, Dr Uhde, made the following plea to the court for clemency on account of Knöchlein's wife and family, who had attended every day of the trial:

All that is left for me to say is that some little doubt may have remained in the minds of the Court which will enable the members not to award the extreme penalty. Spare the life of the accused. He has a wife and four children who are dependent upon him for support. Consider also the fact that he is a soldier, and the Court is composed of members of the British Army. I believe I am entitled to appeal to the Court to pronounce a sentence which will enable my client to come out of prison at an early date.

Despite this plea, at 15:00 he was sentenced to death by hanging, which was carried out on 21 January 1949 in Hamelin. No other German soldiers or officers were prosecuted for their roles in the massacre. Lieutenant Colonel Scotland later expressed anger that Private Pooley had not been believed when he was repatriated: had his version of events been properly investigated at the time, an immediate investigation through the International Court in Geneva would have shone 'a worldwide spotlight on the crimes of the SS'. He considered that such attention might have brought a halt to the more savage breaches of international law before the end of the war.

== See also ==
- List of massacres in France
- Wormhoudt massacre – massacre of British and French prisoners of war (28 May 1940)
- Oignies and Courrières massacre – massacre of French civilians (28 May 1940)
- Vinkt massacre – massacre of Belgian civilians (26–28 May 1940)
