= 9th Motorized Division =

- 9e division d'infanterie motorisée
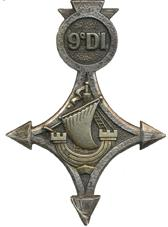
- Unit insignia
- Active: 1873 - 1962
- Country: France
- Branch: French Army
- Type: Motorized infantry
- Engagements: World War I World War II; Algerian War; Cold War

The French 9th Motorized Division originally known as the 9th Infantry Division, was a French Army division active during World War I, World War II and the Algerian War.

== Battle Of France 1940 ==
During the Battle of France in May 1940, the division contained the following units:

- 13th Infantry Regiment
- 95th Infantry Regiment
- 131st Infantry Regiment
- 2nd Reconnaissance Battalion
- 30th Artillery Regiment
- 230th Artillery Regiment

The division was an active division which had existed during peacetime. It was a fully motorized infantry division.

== Algerian War ==
The 9th Infantry Division was recreated within the 1st Military Region (Île-de-France, Paris region), with headquarters in Versailles, as part of the Valmy Plan (by calling up the contingent during the Algerian War and recalling the liberated classes). It arrived in Algeria in June 1956.

It took part in operations in the Orléansville area, west of Algiers. It formed part of the Algiers military division (which became the Algiers army corps in 1958 and then the 23rd Army Corps in 1962). It was dissolved on 31 December 1962.

The division was part of the Algiers Corps Area in 1960, during the Algerian War.
