= Stepanovka =

Stepanovka may refer to:

- Stepanovka, Orekhovo-Zuyevsky District, Moscow Oblast, a village in Orekhovo-Zuyevsky District of Moscow Oblast, Russia
- Stepanovka, Serebryano-Prudsky District, Moscow Oblast, a village in Serebryano-Prudsky District of Moscow Oblast, Russia
- Stepanovka, Nizhny Novgorod Oblast, a settlement in Nizhny Novgorod Oblast, Russia
- Stepanovka, name of several other rural localities in Russia
- Stepanivka, Sumy Oblast, a village in Sumy Oblast, Ukraine
