= Lestrem =

Lestrem De Stroom
- Commune
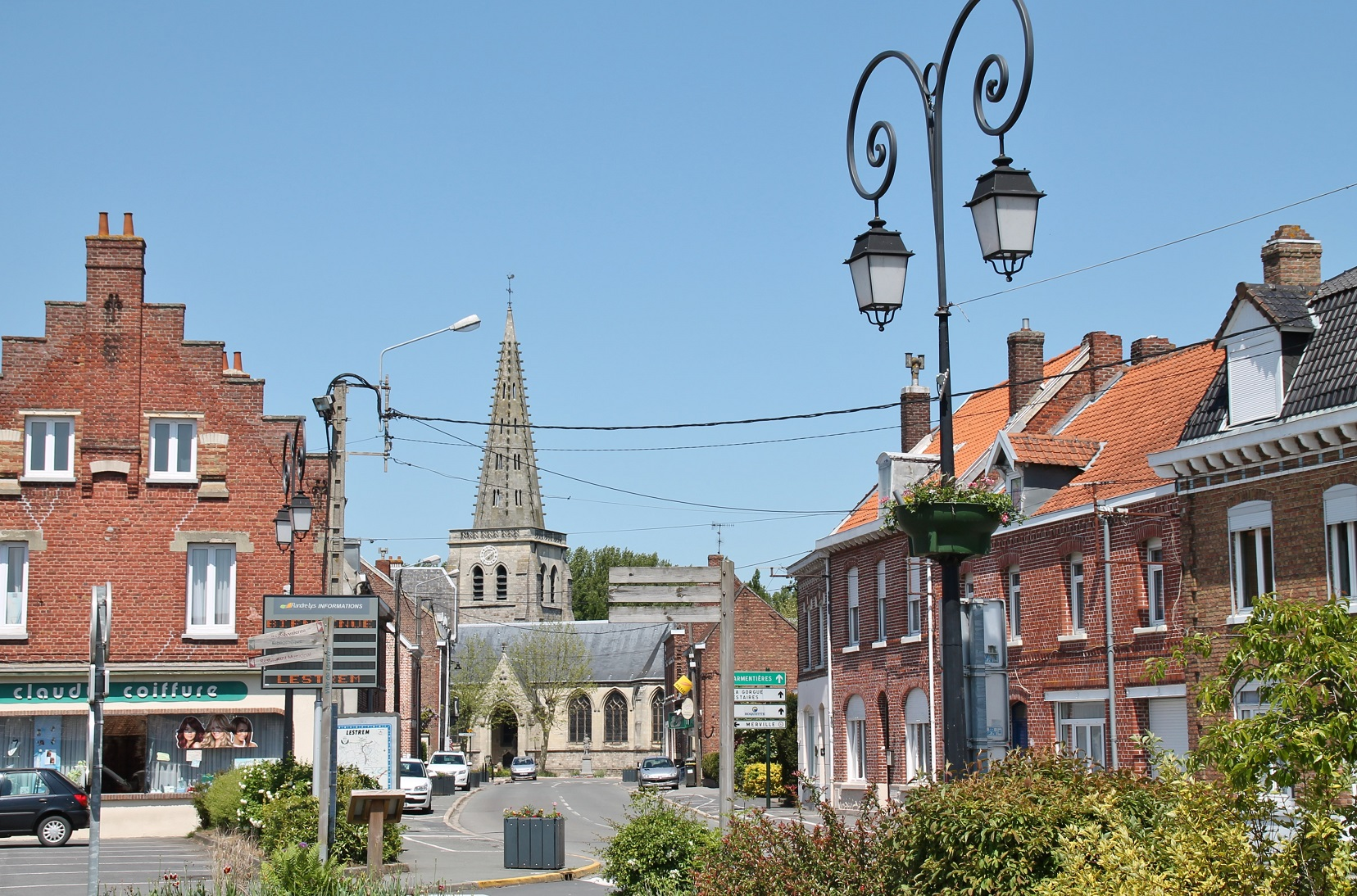
- Lestrem

- Coat of arms
- Location of Lestrem
- Location within France Location within Hauts-de-France
- Coordinates: 50°37′23″N 2°41′09″E
- Country: France
- Region: Hauts-de-France
- Department: Pas-de-Calais
- Arrondissement: Béthune
- Canton: Lillers
- Intercommunality: Flandre Lys

Government
  - Mayor (2020–2026): Jacques Hurlus
- Area^{1}: 21.15 km^{2} (8.17 sq mi)
- Elevation: 18 m (59 ft)
- Highest elevation: 20 m (66 ft)
- Lowest elevation: 13 m (43 ft)
- Population (2023): 5,009
  - Density: 236.8/km^{2} (613.4/sq mi)
- Time zone: UTC+01:00 (CET)
  - Summer (DST): UTC+02:00 (CEST)
- INSEE/Postal code: 62502 /62136
- ^{1} French Land Register data, which excludes lakes, ponds, glaciers > 1 km^{2} (0.386 sq mi or 247 acres) and river estuaries.

Lestrem (French pronunciation: [letʁɛm]; Dutch: De Stroom; Picard: Létrin) is a commune in the Pas-de-Calais department in the Hauts-de-France region of France. about 8 miles (13 km) north of Béthune and 19 miles (31 km) west of Lille by the banks of the Lawe River.

== History ==
In 1940 the hamlet of Le Paradis, on the south side of the commune, was the site of the Le Paradis massacre of British troops of the BEF, during the Battle of France.

== Population ==
Historical population
Year	Pop.	±% p.a.
1968	2,662	—
1975	2,727	+0.35%
1982	3,044	+1.58%
1990	3,753	+2.65%
1999	3,789	+0.11%
2007	3,943	+0.50%
2012	4,329	+1.89%
2017	4,532	+0.92%
2023	5,009	+1.68%
Source: INSEE

== Twin town ==
The town is twinned with Swanland in the East Riding of Yorkshire, England.

== See also ==
- Communes of the Pas-de-Calais department
