= Bibliography of Nazi Germany =

Nazi Germany

This is a list of books about Nazi Germany, the state that existed in Germany during the period from 1933 to 1945, when its government was controlled by Adolf Hitler and his National Socialist German Workers' Party (NSDAP; Nazi Party). It also includes some important works on the development of Nazi imperial ideology, totalitarianism, German society during the era, the formation of anti-Semitic racial policies, the post-war ramifications of Nazism, along with various conceptual interpretations of the Third Reich.

== Surveys, general and comparative studies, and reference works ==
- Abel, Theodore. The Nazi Movement. New York: Atherton, 1966.
- Arad, Yitzhak, ed. The Pictorial History of the Holocaust. Jerusalem and New York: Yad Vashem and Macmillan, 1990.
- Arendt, Hannah. The Origins of Totalitarianism. Orlando, FL: Harcourt Inc., 1973.
- Aschheim, Steven E. Culture and Catastrophe: German and Jewish Confrontations with National Socialism and Other Crises. New York: New York University Press, 1996.
- Aycoberry, Pierre. The Nazi Question. An Essay on the Interpretations of National Socialism 1922–1975. New York, Pantheon, 1981.
- Bachrach, Susan D. The Nazi Olympics: Berlin 1936. Boston: Little, Brown, 2000.
- Baranowski, Shelley, Armin Nolzen, and Claus-Christian Szejnmann, eds. A Companion to Nazi Germany. Malden, MD: Wiley-Blackwell, 2018.
- Bascomb, Neal. The Nazi Hunters: How a Team of Spies and Survivors Captured the World's Most Notorious Nazi. New York: Arthur A. Levine Books, 2013.
- Beaumont, Maurice, et al. The Third Reich. New York: Praeger, 1955.
- Bendersky, Joseph W. A History of Nazi Germany. Chicago: Nelson-Hall, 1985.
- Benz, Wolfgang. A Concise History of the Third Reich. Berkeley, CA: University of California Press, 2007.
- Bessel, Richard, ed. Fascist Italy and Nazi Germany: Comparisons and Contrasts. Cambridge: Cambridge University Press, 1996.
- Betz, Werner. “The National-Socialist Vocabulary.” In The Third Reich, edited by Maurice Baumont, John Fried, and Edmond Vermeil, 784–796. New York: Frederick Praeger, 1955.
- Biddle, Wayne. Dark Side of the Moon: Wernher von Braun, the Third Reich, and the Space Race. New York: W.W. Norton, 2009.
- Bracher, Karl Dietrich. The German Dictatorship; The Origins, Structure, and Effects of National Socialism; New York, Praeger 1970.
- Breitman, Richard, et al. U.S. Intelligence and the Nazis. Washington DC: National Archives Trust Fund Board, 2004.
- Brissaud André. The Nazi Secret Service. New York: W.W. Norton & Company, 1974.
- Broszat, Martin and Horst Moeller, eds. Das Dritte Reich. Herrschaftsstruktur und Geschichte. Vortraege aus dem IfZG. Munich: Beck Verlag, 1983.
- Broszat, Martin. German National Socialism, 1919–1945. Santa Barbara, CA: ABC Clio Press, 1966.
- Brustein, William. The Logic of Evil: The Social Origins of the Nazi Party, 1925–1933. New Haven: Yale University Press, 1996.
- Burden, H.T. The Nuremberg Party Rallies, 1923–1939. London: Pall Mall Press, 1967.
- Burleigh, Michael. The Third Reich: A New History. New York: Hill and Wang, 2001.Standard scholarly history
- Caplan, Jane. Government without Administration: State and Civil Service in Weimar and Nazi Germany. Oxford: Clarendon Press, 1988.
- Caplan, Jane, ed. Nazi Germany. New York: Oxford University Press, 2008.
- Caplan, Jane. Nazi Germany: A Very Short Introduction. New York: Oxford University Press, 2019.
- Childers, Thomas and Caplan, Jane, eds. Reevaluating the Third Reich. New York: Holmes and Meier, 1993.
- Childers, Thomas. The Third Reich: A History of Nazi Germany. New York: Simon & Schuster, 2017.
- Craig, Gordon. Germany, 1866–1945. New York, Oxford: Oxford University Press, 1978.
- Crew, David. Hitler and the Nazis: A History in Documents. Pages from History. Oxford: Oxford University Press, 2005.
- Crew, David, ed. Nazism and German Society, 1933–1945. New York: Routledge, 1994.
- Diehl-Thiele, Peter. Partei und Staat im Dritten Reich. Untersuchungen zum Verhaeltnis von NSDAP und allgemeiner innerer Staatsverwaltung, 1933–1945. München: Beck, 1969.
- Dülffer, Jost. Nazi Germany, 1933–1945: Faith and Annihilation. New York: Oxford University Press, 1995.
- Edelheit, Abraham J., and Hershel Edelheit. History of the Holocaust: A Handbook and Dictionary. Boulder, CO: Westview Press, 1994.
- Eley, Geoff. From Unification to Nazism. London: Allen and Unwin, 1986.
- Eley, Geoff. Reshaping the Right: Radical Nationalism and Political Change after Bismarck. New Haven, CT: Yale University Press, 1980.
- Epstein, Eric, and Philip Rosen. Dictionary of the Holocaust: Biography, Geography, and Terminology. Westport, CT: Greenwood Press, 1997.
- Evans, Richard J. The Coming of the Third Reich. New York: Penguin, 2005. ISBN 978-0-14-100975-9
- Evans, Richard J. The Third Reich in Power. New York: Penguin, 2006. ISBN 978-0-14-100976-6
- Evans, Richard J. The Third Reich at War: 1939–1945. New York: Penguin, 2010. ISBN 978-0-14-101548-4
- Feuchtwanger, Edgar. From Weimar to Hitler: Germany, 1918–1933. New York: St. Martin's, 1995.
- Fischer, Conan. The Rise of the Nazis. Manchester: University of Manchester Press, 1995.
- Fischer, Fritz. From Kaiserreich to Third Reich: Elements of Continuity in German History 1871–1945 [trans of Bundnis der Eliten]. Winchester MA: Allen and Unwin, 1986.
- Fischer, Klaus. Nazi Germany: A New History. New York: Continuum, 1995.
- Freeman, Michael. An Atlas of Nazi Germany. New York: Prentice Hall, 1987.
- Frei, Norbert. National Socialist Rule in Germany: The Führer State 1933–1945. Oxford: Blackwell, 1993.
- Friedrich, Carl J., and Zbigniew K. Brzezinski. Totalitarian Dictatorship and Autocracy. Cambridge, MA: Harvard University Press, 1956.
- Fritzsche, Peter. Hitler's First Hundred Days: When Germans Embraced the Third Reich (2020)
- Fulbrook, Mary. History of Germany, 1918–2000: The Divided Nation. Malden, MA: Blackwell Publishing, 2002.
- Gellately, Robert. The Oxford Illustrated History of the Third Reich. New York: Oxford University Press, 2018.
- Geyer, Michael, and Sheila Fitzpatrick. Beyond Totalitarianism: Stalinism and Nazism Compared. Cambridge & New York: Cambridge University Press, 2008.
- Gilbert, Martin. Atlas of the Holocaust. New York: Macmillan, 1993.
- Glantz, David M., et al. Slaughterhouse: The Encyclopedia of the Eastern Front. The Aberjona Press, 2004, [2001].
- Gregor, Neil, ed. Nazism. Oxford: Oxford University Press, 2000.
- Gregor, Neil, ed. Nazism, War and Genocide: New Perspectives on the History of the Third Reich. Exeter: University of Exeter Press, 2005.
- Gutman, Israel, ed. Encyclopedia of the Holocaust. New York: Macmillan, 1990.
- Haffner, Sebastian. The Ailing Empire: Germany from Bismarck to Hitler. Princeton: Princeton University Press, 1989.
- Harsch, Donna. German Social Democracy and the Rise of Nazism. Chapel Hill: University of North Carolina Press, 1993.
- Hentschel, Klaus. Physics and National Socialism: An Anthology of Primary Sources. Science Networks Historical Studies, vol. 18. Basel: Birkhäuser Verlag, 1996.
- Herf, Jeffrey. Reactionary Modernism: Technology, Culture, and Politics in Weimar and the Third Reich. Cambridge: Cambridge University Press, 1984.
- Hiden, John, and John Farquharson. Explaining Hitler's Germany: Historians and the Third Reich. Totowa, NJ: Barnes and Noble, 1983.
- Hildebrand, Klaus. The Third Reich. London & New York: Routledge, 1986.
- Hildebrand, Klaus. Vom Reich zum Weltreich. Hitler, NSDAP und koloniale Frage, 1919–1945. München: W. Fink, 1969.
- Hirszowicz, Lukasz. The Third Reich and the Arab East. Toronto: Toronto University Press, 1966.
- Holborn, Hajo. Republic to Reich: The Making of the Nazi Revolution. New York: Pantheon, 1972.
- Hughes, Michael. Nationalism and Society: Germany 1800–1945. London: Edward Arnold, 1988.
- Hülke Hans-Heinrich. Verbrechen, Polizei, Prozessse. Eine Verzeichnis von Büchern und kleineren Schriften in deutscher Sprache. Wiesbaden: Bundeskriminalamt, 1963.
- Hunt, Linda. Secret Agenda: The United States Government, Nazi Scientists, and Project Paperclip, 1945–1990. New York: St. Martin's Press, 1991.
- Independent International Commission of Experts. Switzerland, National Socialism, and the Second World War. Zurich: Pendo, 2002.
- Jarman, T. L. The Rise and Fall of Nazi Germany. New York: University Press, 1956.
- Jones, Larry E. German Liberalism and the Dissolution of the Weimar Party System. Chapel Hill, NC: The University of North Carolina Press, 2011.
- Kallis, Aristotle. Fascist Ideology: Territory and Expansionism in Italy and Germany, 1922–1945. London: Routledge, 2000.
- Kallis, Aristotle. Nazi Propaganda and the Second World War. New York: Palgrave Macmillan, 2005.
- Kammer, Hilde. Lexikon Nationalsozialismus: Begriffe, Organisationen und Institutionen (Rororo-Sachbuch). Uberarbeitete und erw. Neuausg. Hamburg: Rowohlt Taschenbuch, 1999.
- Kershaw, Ian and Moshe Lewin, eds. Stalinism and Nazism: Dictatorships in Comparison. Cambridge: Cambridge University Press, 1997.
- Kershaw, Ian. The Nazi Dictatorship: Problems and Perspectives of Interpretation. New York & London: Bloomsbury Academic, 2000.
- Kirk, Tim. Nazi Germany. Basingstoke, England: Palgrave Macmillan, 2007.
- Koch, H.W., ed. Aspects of the Third Reich. London: Macmillan, 1985.
- Koehl, Robert Lewis. RKFDV: German Resettlement and Population Policy, 1939–1945. A History of the Reich Commission for the Strengthening of Germandom. Cambridge, MA: Harvard University Press, 1957.
- Krüger, Arnd, and W. J. Murray. The Nazi Olympics: Sport, Politics, and Appeasement in the 1930s. Urbana: University of Illinois Press, 2003.
- Laqueur, Walter, and Judith Tydor Baumel, eds. Holocaust Encyclopedia. New Haven and London: Yale University Press, 2001.
- Laska, Vera. Nazism, Resistance & Holocaust in World War II: A Bibliography. Metuchen, N.J.: Scarecrow Press, 1985.
- Leitz, Christian, ed. The Third Reich: The Essential Readings. Oxford, UK: Blackwell Publishers, 1999.
- Martel, Gordon, ed. Modern Germany Reconsidered 1870–1945. London: Routledge, 1992.
- Mayer Milton. The Thought They Were Free: The Germans, 1933–45. Chicago: University of Chicago Press, 1955.
- McDonough, Frank. The Hitler Years: Triumph, 1933–1939. New York: St. Martin's Press, 2021.
- McDonough, Frank. The Hitler Years: Disaster, 1940–1945. New York: St. Martin's Press, 2021.
- Megargee, Geoffrey, ed. The United States Holocaust Memorial Museum Encyclopedia of Camps and Ghettos, 1933–1945. Bloomington, In.: Indiana University Press, 2009.
- Michael, Robert, and Karin Doerr. Nazi-Deutsch/Nazi-German: An English Lexicon of the Language of the Third Reich. Westport, CT: Greenwood Press, 2002.
- Mitchell, Allan, and John L. Snell, eds. The Nazi Revolution: Hitler's Dictatorship and the German Nation. 4th ed. Boston: Houghton Mifflin, 1997.
- Moeller, Robert G. The Nazi State and German Society: A Brief History with Documents (Bedford Series in History and Culture). New York: St. Martin's Press, 2009.
- Mommsen, Hans. From Weimar to Auschwitz. Cambridge: Polity Press, 1991.
- Mommsen, Hans. The Third Reich between Vision and Reality: New Perspectives on German History, 1918–1945. Oxford and New York: Berg, 2003.
- Moore, Michaela Hönicke. Know Your Enemy: The American Debate on Nazism, 1933–1945. New York: Cambridge University Press, 2003.
- Mosse, George L. Germans and Jews. New York: Fertig, 1970.
- Mosse, George L. Nazism: A History and Comparative of National Socialism. New Brunswick, NJ: Transaction Books, 1978.
- Mosse, George L. The Nationalization of the Masses: Political Symbolism and Mass Movements in Germany from the Napoleonic Wars Through the Third Reich. New York: Howard Fertig, 1975.
- Nagorski, Andrew. Hitlerland: American Eyewitnesses to the Nazis Rise to Power. New York : Simon & Schuster, 2012.
- National Council of the National Front of Democratic Germany. Brown Book: War and Nazi Criminals in West Germany. Dresden: Verlag Zeit im Bild, n.d.
- Neumann, Franz L. Behemoth: The Structure and Practice of National Socialism, 1933–1944. New York: Oxford University Press, 1944.
- Nevin, Thomas. Ernst Jünger and Germany. Into the Abyss 1914–1945. London: Constable, 1997.
- Nicholas, Lynn H. The Rape of Europa: The Fate of Europe's Treasure in the Third Reich and Second World War. New York: Alfred A. Knopf, 1994.
- Nicosia, Francis R. The Third Reich and the Palestine Question. London: I.B. Tauris, 1985.
- Noakes, Jeremy. Documents on Nazism, 1919–1945. New York: Viking Press, 1975.
- Norwood, Stephen H. The Third Reich in the Ivory Tower: Complicity and Conflict on American Campuses. New York: Cambridge University Press, 2009.
- Orlow, Dietrich. The History of the Nazi Party. 2 vols. Pittsburgh: University of Pittsburgh Press, 1969–1973.
- Overy, Richard. The Dictators: Hitler's Germany and Stalin's Russia. New York: W. W. Norton & Company, 2006.
- Overy, Richard. The Penguin Historical Atlas of the Third Reich. London: Penguin, 1996.
- Paechter, Heinz. Nazi-Deutsch: A Glossary of Contemporary German Usage. New York:Frederick Ungar, 1944.
- Patterson, David. A Genealogy of Evil: Anti-Semitism from Nazism to Islamic Jihad. New York: Cambridge University Press, 2011.
- Pauley, Bruce F., Hitler, Stalin, and Mussolini: Totalitarianism in the Twentieth Century. Wheeling, IL: Harlan Davidson, 1997.
- Pendas Devin, Mark Roseman, and Richard F Wetzell, eds. Beyond the Racial State: Rethinking Nazi Germany. Cambridge and New York: Cambridge University Press, 2017.
- Peterson, Michael B. Missiles for the Fatherland: Peenemünde, National Socialism, and the V-2 Missile. Cambridge: Cambridge University Press, 2011.
- Rabinbach, Anson, and Sander L. Gilman. The Third Reich Sourcebook (Weimar and Now: German Cultural Criticism). Berkeley & Los Angeles: University of California Press, 2013.
- Rhodes, James M. The Hitler Movement: A Modern Millenarian Revolution. Stanford, CA: Hoover Institute Press, 1980.
- Rockmore, Tom. On Heidegger's Nazism and Philosophy. Berkeley: University of California Press, 1992.
- Rosen, Philip E., and Eric Joseph Epstein. Dictionary of the Holocaust: Biography, Geography, & Terminology. Westport, CT: Greenwood Press, 1997.
- Saidel, Rochelle G. The Outraged Conscience: Seekers of Justice for Nazi War Criminals in America. Albany, NY: SUNY Press, 1984.
- Sax, Benjamin, and Dieter Kuntz. Inside Hitler's Germany: A Documentary History of Life in the Third Reich. Lexington, MA: D.C.Heath, 1992.
- Scheck, Raffael. "Lecture Notes, Germany and Europe, 1871–1945" 2008. full text online, a brief textbook by a leading scholar
- Sereny Gitta. Into that Darkness: An Examination of Conscience. New York: Random House, 1974.
- Shirer, William L. The Rise and Fall of the Third Reich. New York: Simon & Schuster, 1960.
- Sidman, Charles F. (ed). Inside Hitler's Germany. Lawrence, KS: Kansas University Press, 1977.
- Snell, John L., and Allan Mitchell. The Nazi Revolution: Hitler's Dictatorship and the German Nation. Lexington, MA: D.C. Heath and Company, 1973.
- Snyder, Louis L. Hitler's Third Reich: A Documentary History. Chicago: Nelson-Hall, 1981.
- Snyder, Louis L. Encyclopedia of the Third Reich. New York: Paragon House, 1989, [1976].
- Speer, Albert. Inside the Third Reich. New York: Simon & Schuster, 1997.
- Spielvogel, Jackson. Hitler and Nazi Germany: A History. Englewood Cliff, NJ: Prentice Hall, 1992. (4th Edition – 2001) ISBN 0-13-975996-4
- Stachura, Peter D. The Nazi Machtergreifung. London: Allen & Unwin, 1983.
- Stachura, Peter D., ed. The Shaping of the Nazi State. London: Croom Helm, 1978.
- Stackelberg, Roderick. Hitler's Germany: Origins, Interpretations, Legacies. New York: Routledge, 2008.
- Stackelberg, Roderick. The Nazi Germany Sourcebook: An Anthology of Texts. Edited by Sally A. Winkle. New York: Routledge, 2002.
- Stackelberg, Roderick. The Routledge Companion to Nazi Germany. New York: Routledge, 2007.
- Steinhoff, Jonannes, Pechel, Peter, and Dennis Showalter. Voices from The Third Reich: An Oral History. Washington D.C.: Da Capo Press, 1994.
- Steinweis, Alan E., and Daniel E. Roger. The Impact of Nazism: New Perspectives on the Third Reich and its Legacy. Lincoln, NE: University of Nebraska Press, 2003.
- Steinweis, Alan E. The People's Dictatorship: A History of Nazi Germany. Cambridge and New York: Cambridge University Press, 2023.
- Stern, Fritz. The Politics of Cultural Despair: A Study in the Rise of the Germanic Ideology. Berkeley: University of California Press, 1963.
- Stone, Dan. The Historiography of the Holocaust. Houndmills: Palgrave Macmillan, 2004.
- Taylor, James, and Warren Shaw. Dictionary of the Third Reich. New York: Penguin, 2002.
- Taylor, James, and Warren Shaw, comps. The Third Reich Almanac. New York: World Almanac, 1987.
- Thornton, M. J. Nazism, 1918–1945. New York: Pergamon Press, 1966.
- Trials of War Criminals before the Nuremberg Military Tribunals under Control Council Law, No. 10, vols. 12 and 14, Nuremberg, October 1946–April 1949, Washington, D.C.: U.S. Government Printing Office, 1950.
- Tubach, Frederic C. German Voices: Memories of Life during Hitler's Third Reich. Berkeley: University of California Press, 2011.
- Turner, Henry A., ed. Nazism and the Third Reich. New York: Grolier Publishing, 1972.
- United States Holocaust Memorial Museum. Historical Atlas of the Holocaust. New York: Macmillan Publishing, 1996.
- U.S. Department of State Historical Office. A Catalog of Files and Microfilms of the German Foreign Ministry Archives, 1920–1945. 3 vols. Stanford: Hoover Institution, 1962, 1964, 1966.
- U.S. Holocaust Memorial Council. The Nazi Olympics, Berlin, 1936. Washington, D.C.: United States Holocaust Memorial Council, 1997.
- U.S. Holocaust Memorial Museum. Historical Atlas of the Holocaust. New York: Simon & Schuster, 1996.
- U.S. National Archives and Records Administration. Captured German and Related Records in the National Archives. Washington, D.C., revised February 1993.
- U.S. National Archives and Records Administration. Guides to German Records Microfilmed at Alexandria, VA. Washington, D.C., 1958
- U.S. National Archives and Records Administration. Pamphlets Describing Records of the United States: Nürnberg War Crimes Trials. Washington, D.C.: 1973.
- Verein deutscher Archivare. Archive in der Bundesrepublik Deutschland, Österreich, und der Schweiz. Münster: Ardey-Verlag, 1995.
- Vogt, Hannah. The Burden of Guilt: A Short History of Germany 1914–1945. trans. Herbert Strauss, New York: Oxford University Press, 1964.
- Vondung, Klaus. The Apocalypse in Germany. Columbia: University of Missouri Press, 2000.
- Waite, Robert G. L., ed. Hitler and Nazi Germany. New York: Holt, Rinehart & Winston, 1965.
- Wallace, Max. The American Axis: Henry Ford, Charles Lindbergh, and the Rise of the Third Reich. New York: St. Martin's Press, 2003.
- Walker, Mark. Nazi Science: Myth, Truth, and the German Atomic Bomb. Cambridge, Mass.: Perseus, 1995.
- Walters, Guy. Berlin Games: How Hitler Stole the Olympic Dream. London: John Murray, 2006.
- Walters, Guy. Hunting Evil: The Nazi War Criminals Who Escaped and the Quest to Bring Them to Justice. New York: Broadway Books, 2010.
- Watts, Tim J. Nazi War Criminals in the United States: A Bibliography. Monticello, IL: Vance Bibliographies, 1989.
- Weinberg, Gerhard L. Germany, Hitler, and World War II: Essays in Modern German and World History. New York & Cambridge: Cambridge University Press, 1996.
- Weindling, Paul. Health, Race and German Politics between National Unification and Nazism, 1870–1945. Cambridge & New York: Cambridge University Press, 1993.
- Williamson, David G. The Third Reich. New York: Longman, 1982.
- Wilt, Alan F. Nazi Germany. Wheeling, IL: Harlan Davidson, 1994.
- Wires, Richard. Terminology of the Third Reich. Muncie, IN: Ball State University, 1985.
- Young, Julian. Heidegger, Philosophy, Nazism. Cambridge: Cambridge University Press, 1997.
- Zeitschriften-Dienst, June 1939–August 1944, Reichpresseamt des Reichsministeriums für Volksaufklärung und Propaganda.
- Zentner, Christian and Friedemann Bedürftig, eds. The Encyclopedia of the Third Reich. 2 vol. Macmillan, 1991.

== Economics and financing ==
- Aarons, Mark and John Loftus. Unholy Trinity: the Vatican, the Nazis, and the Swiss Banks. New York: St. Martin's Griffin, 1998.
- Aly, Götz. Hitler's Beneficiaries: Plunder, Racial War, and the Nazi Welfare State. Translated by Jefferson Chase. New York: Metropolitan, 2007.
- Barkai, Avraham. Nazi Economics: Ideology, Theory, and Policy. New Haven, CT: Yale University Press, 1990.
- Barkai, Avraham. From Boycott to Annihilation: The Economic Struggle of German Jews, 1933–1943. Hanover, NH, 1989.
- Bauer, Yehuda. Jews for sale? The Negotiations between Nazis and Jews 1933–1945. Paris: Liania Levi, 1996.
- Bellon, Bernard P. Mercedes in Peace and War: German Automobile Workers, 1903– 1945. New York: Columbia University Press, 1990.
- Black, Edwin. IBM and the Holocaust: The Strategic Alliance between Nazi Germany and America's Most Powerful Corporation. New York: Crown, 2001.
- Boelcke, Willi A. Die Kosten von Hitlers Krieg: Kriegsfinanzierung und finanzielles Kriegserbe in Deutschland, 1933–1948. Paderborn: Schöningh, 1985.
- Borkin, Joseph and Charles A. Welsh. Germany's Master Plan: The Story of Industrial Offensive. New York: Duell, Sloan and Pearce, 1943.
- Borkin, Joseph. The Crime and Punishment of I.G. Farben. New York: Barnes and Noble, 1997.
- Buggeln, Marc. Slave Labor in Nazi Concentration Camps. New York: Oxford University Press, 2014.
- Carroll, Berenice. A Design for Total War: Arms and Economics in the Third Reich. The Hague and Paris: Mouton Publishing, 1968.
- Dean, Martin. Robbing the Jews: The Confiscation of Jewish Property in the Holocaust, 1933–1945. Cambridge & New York: Cambridge University Press, 2010.
- Eizenstat, Stuart E. Testimony: on the U.S. Government Supplementary Report on Nazi Assets. Washington: State Department, 1998.
- Feldman, Gerald D. Allianz and the German Insurance Business, 1933–1945. New York & London: Cambridge University Press, 2001.
- Gillingham, John. Industry and Politics in the Third Reich: Ruhr Coal, Hitler and Europe. New York:, Columbia University Press, 1985.
- Gregor, Neil. Daimler Benz in the Third Reich. New Haven: Yale University Press, 1998.
- Halbrook, Stephen P. Target Switzerland: Swiss Armed Neutrality in World War II. Rockville Centre, NY: Sarpedon, 1998.
- Hayes, Peter. Industry and Ideology: IG Farben in the Nazi Era. Cambridge, MA: Harvard Press, 1987.
- Hayes, Peter. Profits & Persecution: German Big Business in the Nazi Economy and the Holocaust. Cambridge and New York: Cambridge University Press, 2025.
- Henry, Marilyn. Switzerland, Swiss Banks, and the Second World War: The Story Behind the Story. New York: American Jewish Committee, 1997.
- Herbert, Ulrich. Hitler's Foreign Workers: Enforced Labor in Germany under the Third Reich. Cambridge: Cambridge University Press, 1997.
- Herbst, Ludolf. Der totale Krieg und die Ordnung der Wirtschaft: Die Kriegswirtschaft im Spannungsfeld von Politik, Ideologie und Propaganda, 1939–1945. Stuttgart: Deutsche Verlags-Anstalt, 1982.
- Homze, Edward L. Foreign Labor in Nazi Germany. Princeton, New Jersey: Princeton University Press, 1967.
- James, Harold. Deutsche Bank and the Nazi Economic War against the Jews: The Expropriation of Jewish-Owned Property. New York: Cambridge University Press, 2001.
- James, Harold. The Nazi Dictatorship and the Deutsche Bank. New York: Cambridge University Press, 2004.
- Janssen, Gregor. Das Ministerium Speer: Deutschlands Rustung im Kreig. Berlin: Ullstein Verlag, 1968.
- Jaskot, Paul B. The Architecture of Oppression: The SS, Forced Labor and the Nazi Monumental Building Economy. London: Routledge, 2000.
- Klein, Burton H. Germany's Economic Preparations for War. Cambridge, MA: Harvard University Press, 1964.
- Mason, Timothy W., and Jane Caplan. Nazism, Fascism and the Working Class. Cambridge: Cambridge University Press, 1995.
- Mierzejewski, Alfred C. The Collapse of the German War Economy 1944–1945. Allied Air Power and the German National Railway. Chapel Hill, NC: University of North Carolina Press, 1988.
- Milward, Alan S. The German Economy at War. London: London University Press, 1965
- Mises, Ludwig von, Omnipotent Government: The Rise of the Total State and Total War. New Haven: Yale University Press, 1944.
- Nicosia, Francis R., and Jonathan Huener, eds. Business and Industry in Nazi Germany. New York: Berghahn Books, 2004.
- Overy, Richard J. The Nazi Economic Recovery 1932–1938. Cambridge: Cambridge University Press, 1996.
- Overy, Richard J. War and Economy in the Third Reich. Oxford: Clarendon Press, 1994.
- Patel, Kiran Klaus. Soldiers of Labor: Labor Service in Nazi Germany and New Deal America, 1933–1945. New York: Cambridge University Press, 2005.
- Poole, Kenyon E. German Financial Policies, 1937–1939. New York: Gordon Press, 1977.
- Schweitzer, Arthur. Big Business in the Third Reich. Bloomington, IN: Indiana University Press, 1964.
- Silverman, Dan P. Hitler's Economy: Nazi Work Creation Programs, 1933–1936. Cambridge: Harvard University Press, 1998.
- Sohn-Rethel, Alfred. Economy and Class Structure of German Fascism. London, CSE Bks, 1978.
- Speer, Albert. Infiltration. New York: Macmillan, 1981.
- Speier, Hans. German White-Collar Workers and the Rise of Hitler. New Haven: Yale University Press, 1986.
- Tooze, Adam. The Wages of Destruction: The Making and the Breaking of the Nazi Economy. New York: Viking, 2006.
- Turner, Henry Ashby. German Big Business and the Rise of Hitler. New York: Oxford University Press, 1985.
- Wiesen, Jonathan. Creating the Nazi Marketplace: Commerce and Consumption in the Third Reich. New York and London: Cambridge University Press, 2010.
- Ziegler, Jean. The Swiss, the Gold, and the Dead: How Swiss Bankers Helped Finance the Nazi War Machine. New York: Harcourt Brace, 1998.
- Zilbert, Edward R. Albert Speer and the Nazi Ministry of Arms: Economic Institutions and Industrial Production in the German War Economy. East Brunswick, NJ: Fairleigh Dickinson, 1981.

== Historiography and memory ==
- Art, David. The Politics of the Nazi Past in Germany and Austria. New York & London: Cambridge University Press, 2005.
- Bartov, Omer. The Holocaust: Origins, Implementation, Aftermath. New York: Routledge, 2000.
- Egremont, Max. Forgotten Land: Journeys among the Ghosts of East Prussia. New York: Farrar, Straus, and Giroux, 2011.
- Eley, Geoff. From Unification to Nazism: Reinterpreting the German Past. London: Allen & Unwin, 1986.
- Evans, Richard J. The Third Reich in History and Memory (2015) excerpt and text search
- Evans, Richard J. "From Hitler to Bismarck: 'Third Reich' and Kaiserreich in Recent Historiography: Part II." The Historical Journal (1983) 26#4 pp: 999–1020.
- Evans, Richard J. Rereading German History: From Unification to Reunification 1800–1996. New York: Routledge, 1997.
- Fisher, Marc. After the Wall: Germany, the Germans, and the Burdens of History. New York: Simon & Schuster, 1995.
- Frei, Norbert. Adenauer's Germany and the Nazi Past: The Politics of Amnesty and Integration. New York: Columbia University Press, 2002.
- Gregor, Neil. Haunted City: Nuremberg and the Nazi Past. New Haven: Yale University Press, 2008.
- Heilbronner, Oded. "The Role of Nazi Antisemitism in the Nazi Party's Activity and Propaganda: A Regional Historiographical Study." The Leo Baeck Institute Yearbook (1990) 35#1 pp: 397–439.
- Herf, Jeffrey. Divided Memory: The Nazi Past in the Two Germanys. Cambridge, MA: Harvard University Press, 1999.
- Hiden, John, and John E. Farquharson. Explaining Hitler's Germany: Historians and the Third Reich (Batsford Academic and Educational Ltd., 1989)
- Hofer, Walther. "Fifty years on: historians and the Third Reich." Journal of Contemporary History (1986): 225–251. in JSTOR
- Jarausch, Konrad H. "Removing the Nazi stain? The quarrel of the German historians." German Studies Review (1988): 285–301. in JSTOR
- Jarausch, Konrad H. After Hitler: Recivilizing Germans, 1945–1995. New York: Oxford University Press, 2008.
- Johnson, Eric and Karl-Heinz Reuband. What We Knew: Terror, Mass Murder, and Everyday Life in Nazi Germany. New York: Basic Books, 2006.
- Kershaw, Ian. The Nazi Dictatorship: Problems and Perspectives of Interpretation. New York & London: Bloomsbury Academic, 2000.
- Klemperer, Victor. Language of the Third Reich: LTI. New York & London: Continuum, 2006.
- Kohut, Thomas. A German Generation. New Haven and London: Yale University Press, 2012.
- Lamberti, Marjorie. "The Search for the 'Other Germany': Refugee Historians from Nazi Germany and the Contested Historical Legacy of the Resistance to Hitler." Central European History (2014) 47#2 pp: 402–429.
- Leitz, Christian, ed. The Third Reich: The Essential Readings (Wiley-Blackwell, 1999)
- Liddell-Hart, B.H. The German Generals Talk. New York: Quill, 1979 [1948].
- Low, Alfred D. The Third Reich and the Holocaust in German Historiography: Toward the Historikerstreit of the Mid-1980s (East European Monographs, 1994)
- MacDonogh, Giles. After the Reich: The Brutal History of the Allied Occupation. New York: Basic Books, 2009.
- Maier, Charles S. The Unmasterable Past: History, Holocaust, and German National Identity. Cambridge, MA: Harvard University Press, 1998.
- Marrus, Michael R. The Holocaust in History. New York: Meridian, 1987.
- Niven, Bill. Facing the Nazi Past: United Germany and the Legacy of the Third Reich (Routledge, 2003)
- Petropoulos, Jonathan, and John K. Roth, eds. Gray Zones: Ambiguity and Compromise in the Holocaust and its Aftermath. New York and Oxford: Berghahn Books, 2005.
- Potter, Pamela M. "Dismantling a dystopia: On the historiography of music in the Third Reich." Central European History (2007) 40#4 pp: 623.
- Schlie, Ulrich. "Today's view of the Third Reich and the Second World War in German historiographical discourse." The Historical Journal (2000) 43#2 pp: 543–564.
- Stackelberg, Roderick. Routledge Companion to Nazi Germany (Routledge, 2007)
- Stern, Fritz. Five Germanys I Have Known. New York: Farrar, Straus and Giroux, 2007.
- Stone, Dan (2011). Histories of the Holocaust. Oxford New York: Oxford University Press. ISBN 978-0-19-956679-2.
- Taylor, Frederick. Exorcising Hitler: The Occupation and Denazification of Germany. New York & Berlin: Bloomsbury Press, 2011.
- Tormey, Simon. Making Sense of Tyranny: Interpretations of Totalitarianism. Manchester University Press, 1995.

== Hitler and the Nazi Party ==
- Abel, Theodore. Why Hitler Came to Power. Cambridge: Harvard University Press, 1986.
- Aronson, Shlomo. Hitler, the Allies, and the Jews. Cambridge: Cambridge University Press, 2004.
- Baynes, Norman H., ed. The Speeches of Adolf Hitler, April 1933–August 1939. 2 vols, New York: Howard Fertig, 1969.
- Below, Nicolaus von. At Hitler's Side: The Memoirs of Hitler's Luftwaffe Adjutant 1937–1945. Mechanicsburg, PA: Stackpole Books, 2001.
- Berghahn, Klaus L., and Jost Hermand, eds. Unmasking Hitler: Cultural Representations of Hitler from the Weimar Republic to the Present. German Life and Civilization, vol. 44. Oxford: Peter Lang, 2005.
- Binion, Rudolph. Hitler among the Germans. De Kalb: Northern Illinois University Press, 1984.
- Boldt, Gerhard. Hitler's Last Days. London: Arthur Barker, 1973.
- Brett-Smith, Richard. Hitler's Generals. Novato, CA: Presidio Press, 1977.
- Broszat, Martin. Hitler and the Collapse of Weimar Germany. London: Berg Publishers, 1987.
- Broszat, Martin. "Hitler and the Genesis of the 'Final Solution': An Assessment of David Irving's Theses." In The "Final Solution": Historical Articles on the Destruction of the European Jews (9 vols.), ed. Michael R. Marrus, 1, pt. 3:115–167. Westport, CT: Meckler, 1989.
- Broszat, Martin. The Hitler State: The Foundation and Development of the Internal Structure of the Third Reich. Harlow: Longmans, 1981.
- Bullock, Alan. Hitler: A Study in Tyranny. New York: Harper & Row, 1964.
- Bullock, Alan. Hitler and Stalin: Parallel Lives. New York: Alfred Knopf, 1992.
- Burrin, Philippe. Hitler and the Jews: The Genesis of the Holocaust. London: Edward Arnold, 1994.
- Carr, William. Hitler. A Study in Personality and Politics. London: Arnold Press, 1978.
- Childers, Thomas. A History of Hitler's Empire. Chantilly, Va.: Teaching Co., 2001.
- Cigaretten-Bilderdienst GmbH, and Hermann Göring. The Propaganda of Adolf Hitler. Phoenix, AZ: O'Sullivan Woodside, 1975.
- Corsi, Jerome R. Hunting Hitler: New Scientific Evidence That Hitler Escaped Nazi Germany. New York: Skyhorse Publishing, 2014.
- Davidson, Eugene. The Making of Adolf Hitler. New York: Macmillan, 1978.
- Dietrich, Otto, and Robert Moorehouse. The Hitler I Knew: Memoirs of the Third Reich's Press Chief. New York: Skyhorse Publishing, 2010 [1955].
- Dolan, Edward. Adolf Hitler. New York: Dodd, Mead, 1981.
- Domarus, Max, ed. Hitler: Speeches and Proclamations, 1932–1945. 4 vols. Wauconda, Ill.: Bolchazy-Carducci, 1990–1998.
- Eitner, Hans-Jürgen. Der Führer. Munich: Langen Müller, 1981.
- Engelmann, Bernt. In Hitler's Germany. New York: Pantheon, 1986.
- Felton, Mark. Guarding Hitler: The Secret World of the Führer. London: Pen and Sword Military, 2014.
- Fenyo, Mario D. Hitler, Horthy, and Hungary. New Haven, CT: Yale University Press, 1972.
- Fest, Joachim C. Inside Hitler's Bunker: The Last Days of the Third Reich. New York: Farrar, Straus and Giroux, 2004.
- Fest, Joachim C. Hitler. Orlando, FL.: Mariner Books, 2002.
- Fleming, Gerald. Hitler and the Final Solution. Berkeley: University of California Press, 1984.
- Flood, C. B. Hitler: The Path to Power. Boston: Houghton Mifflin, 1989.
- Gassert, Philipp, and Daniel S. Mattern. The Hitler Library: A Bibliography. Westport, CT: Greenwood Publishing, 2001.
- Geary, Dick. Hitler and Nazism. Lancaster Pamphlets. London: Routledge, 1993.
- Gervasi, Frank. Adolf Hitler. New York: Hawthorne, 1974.
- Gordon, Harold. Hitler and the Beer Hall Putsch. Princeton: Princeton Univ. Press, 1972.
- Gordon, Sarah. Hitler, Germans and the Jewish Question. Princeton, NJ: Princeton University Press, 1984.
- Grunberger, Richard. Hitler's S.S. New York: Dell, 1971.
- Haffner, Sebastian. The Meaning of Hitler. Cambridge, MA: Harvard University Press, 1983.
- Hallig, Christian. Festung Alpen – Hitlers letzter Wahn. Freiburg: Herder Taschenbuch Verlag, 1989.
- Hamann, Brigitte. Hitler's Vienna: A Dictator's Apprenticeship. New York: Oxford University Press, 1998.
- Hamilton, Charles. Leaders & Personalities of the Third Reich, Vol. 1. R. James Bender Publishing, 1984.
- Hamilton, Charles. Leaders & Personalities of the Third Reich, Vol. 2 . R. James Bender Publishing, 1996.
- Hart-Davis, Duff. Hitler's Games: The 1936 Olympics. London: Century, 1986.
- Heck, Alfons. A Child of Hitler. Germany in the Days when God Wore a Swastika. Frederick, CO: Renaissance House, 1985.
- Herstein, Robert Edwin. Adolf Hitler and the Third Reich, 1933–1945. Boston: Houghton Mifflin, 1971.
- Herzstein, Robert E. Adolf Hitler and the German Trauma, 1913–1945: An Interpretation of the Nazi Phenomenon. New York: Perigee-Putnam, 1974.
- Hesse, Fritz. Hitler and the English. London: Wingate, 1954.
- Hesse, Fritz. Hitler's Table Talk. London: Weidenfeld and Nicolson, 1953.
- Hillgruber, Andreas. Hitlers Strategie: Politik und Kriegführung 1940–1941. Bonn: Bernard & Graefe Verlag für Wehrwesen, 1993.
- Hitler, Adolf. Hitler's Secret Book. New York: Bramhall House, 1986.
- Hitler, Adolf. Hitler's Table Talks, 1941–1944: His Private Conversations. Translated by Norman Cameron and R.H. Stevens. New York: Enigma Books, 2000.
- Hitler, Adolf. Hitlers Zweites Buch: Ein Dokument aus dem Jahre 1928. With a preface and commentary by Gerhard L. Weinberg, and foreword by Hans Rothfels. Stuttgart, 1961.
- Hitler, Adolf (ed. Max Domarus). Speeches and Proclamations 1932–1945. The Chronicle of a Dictatorship. Wauconda, IL: Bolchazy-Carducci, 1990.
- Hitler, Adolf. Speeches of Adolf Hitler: Representative Passages from the Early Speeches, 1922–1924, and Other Selections. Edited by Norman Hepburn Baynes. New York: Howard Fertig, 2006.
- Hitler, Adolf. The Testament of Adolf Hitler. London: Cassell, 1961.
- Hitler, Bridget. The Memoirs of Bridget Hitler. New York: Duckworth, 1979.
- Hoffmann, Peter. Hitler's Personal Security. Cambridge, MA: MIT Press, 1979.
- Jäckel, Eberhard. Hitler in History. Hannover, NH: Brandeis University Press, 1984.
- Jäckel, Eberhard. Hitler's World View: A Blueprint for Power. Cambridge, Mass.: Harvard University Press, 1981.
- Jenks, W.A. Vienna and the Young Hitler. New York: Columbia University Press, 1960.
- Joachimsthaler, Anton. The Last Days of Hitler: The Legends, The Evidence, The Truth . Brockhampton Press, 1999, [1995].
- Jones, Nigel H. Hitler's Heralds: The Story of the Freikorps, 1918–1923. New York: Dorset Press, 1992.
- Jones, Sydney. Hitler in Vienna, 1907–1913: Clues to the Future. New York: Cooper Square Press, 2002 [1982].
- Junge, Traudl, and Melissa Muller. Hitler's Last Secretary: A Firsthand Account of Life with Hitler. New York: Arcade Publishing, 2011.
- Kater, Michael. Hitler Youth. Cambridge, MA: Harvard University Press, 2006.
- Kellerhoff, Sven. The Führer Bunker. Berlin: Berlin Story Verlag, 2004.
- Kershaw, Ian. The "Hitler Myth": Image and Reality in the Third Reich., 1987.
- Kershaw, Ian. Hitler: 1889–1936: Hubris. New York: W. W. Norton & Company, 1999.leading scholarly history
- Kershaw, Ian. Hitler, 1936–1945: Nemesis. New York; London: W. W. Norton & Company, 2000.leading scholarly history
- Kershaw, Ian. Hitler: A Biography. New York: W. W. Norton & Company, 2008.
- Kershaw, Ian. Hitler, the Germans, and the Final Solution. New Haven & London: Yale University Press, 2008.
- Koch, H. W. Hitler Youth: Origins and Development, 1922–1945. New York: Barnes & Noble, 1996.
- Kubizek, August. The Young Hitler I Knew: The Memoirs of Hitler's Childhood Friend. Barnsley: Frontline Books, 2011.
- Langer, Walter. The Mind of Adolf Hitler: The Secret Wartime Report. New York: New American Library, 1985.
- Lewin, Ronald. Hitler's Mistakes. London: Secker & Warburg, 1984.
- Lewis, Brenda Ralph. Hitler Youth: The Hitlerjugend in War and Peace, 1933–1945. Osceola, WI: MBI Publications, 2000.
- Longerich, Peter. The Unwritten Order: Hitler's Role in the Final Solution. London: Tempus, 2005.
- Longerich, Peter. Hitler: A Biography. Oxford and New York: Oxford University Press, 2019.
- Lüdecke, Kurt. I Knew Hitler. New York: Scribner's, 1937.
- Lukacs, John. The Hitler of History. New York: Alfred A. Knopf, 1997.
- Machtan, Lothar. The Hidden Hitler. New York: Basic Books, 2001.
- Maltitz, Horst von. The Evolution of Hitler's Germany: The Ideology, the Personality, the Moment. New York: McGraw-Hill, 1961.
- Maser, Werner. Hitler: Legend, Myth and Reality. New York: Harper, 1973.
- Maser, Werner, ed. Hitler's Letters and Notes. New York: Harper & Row, 1974.
- McDonough, Frank. Hitler and Nazi Germany. Cambridge & New York: Cambridge University Press, 1999.
- McElligott, Anthony, and Tim Kirk, eds. Working towards the Führer: Essays in Honour of Sir Ian Kershaw. Manchester, England: Manchester University Press, 2003.
- McRandle, James H. The Track of the Wolf: Essays on National Socialism and Its Leader, Adolf Hitler. Evanston, IL: Northwestern University Press, 1965.
- Miskolczy, Ambrus. Hitler's Library. Budapest & New York: Central European University Press, 2003.
- Mitchell, Otis C. Hitler over Germany: The Establishment of the Nazi Dictatorship. Philadelphia, PA: Institute for Study of Humanistic Issues, 1983.
- Mitchell, Otis C. Hitler's Nazi State: The Years of Dictatorial Rule, 1934–1945. New York: P.Lang, 1988.
- Mühlberger, Detlef. Hitler's Voice: The Völkischer Beobachter, 1920–1933. 2 vols. Oxford: Peter Lang, 2004.
- Nicholls, David. Adolf Hitler: A Biographical Companion. ABC-CLIO, 2000. 344 pp.
- Olden, Rudolf. Hitler. Hildesheim: Gerstenberg, 1981.
- Overy, Richard. The Dictators: Hitler's Germany, Stalin's Russia. New York: W. W. Norton & Company, 2006.
- Pauley, Bruce. Hitler and the Forgotten Nazis: A History of Austrian National Socialism. Chapel Hill: University of North Carolina Press, 1981.
- Peterson, Edward N. The Limits of Hitler's Power. Princeton, NJ: Princeton University Press, 1969.
- Posner, Gerald L. Hitler's Children. New York: Berkley, 1992.
- Rauschning, Hermann. Hitler Speaks: A Series of Political Conversations with Adolf Hitler on His Real Aims. Whitefish, MT: Kessinger Publishing, 2010.
- Rees, Laurence. Hitler's Charisma: Leading Millions into the Abyss. New York: Pantheon Books, 2012.
- Rhodes, James. The Hitler Movement. Stanford, CA: Hoover Institute, 1980.
- Rich, Norman. Hitler's War Aims. New York: Norton, 1973.
- Rosenbaum, Ron. Explaining Hitler. New York: Basic Books, 1998.
- Rosenfeld, Alvin. Imagining Hitler. Bloomington: Indiana University Press, 1985.
- Schenk, Ernst. Patient Hitler. Düsseldorf: Droste, 1989.
- Schmidt, Paul. Hitler's Interpreter. New York: Macmillan, 1981.
- Schmölders, Claudia, and Adrian Daub. Hitler's Face: The Biography of an Image. Philadelphia: University of Pennsylvania Press, 2006.
- Schramm, Percy Ernst. Hitler: The Man and the Military Leader. Translated by Donald S. Detwiler. Chicago: Quadrangle, 1971.
- Schwaab, Edleff. Hitler's Mind. New York: Praeger. 1992.
- Simms, Brendan. Hitler: A Global Biography. New York: Basic Books, 2019.
- Smith, Bradley. Adolf Hitler: His Family, Childhood, and Youth. Stanford, CA: Stanford University Press, 1967.
- Snyder, Louis L. Hitler's Elite. New York: Berkley Books, 1992.
- Snyder, Louis L. Hitler's Third Reich, a Documentary History. Chicago: Nelson-Hall, 1981.
- Spotts, Frederic. Hitler and the Power of Aesthetics. Woodstock, NY: Overlook Press, 2003.
- Stein, George, ed. Hitler. Englewood Cliffs, NJ: Prentice-Hall, 1968.
- Stern, J. P. Hitler: The Führer and the People. Berkeley, CA: University of California Press, 1975.
- Stierlin, Helm. Adolf Hitler: A Family Perspective. New York: Psychohistory Press, 1976.
- Stone, Norman. Hitler. Boston: Little and Brown, 1980.
- Strasser, Otto. Hitler and I. Boston: Houghton Mifflin, 1940.
- Strawson, John. Hitler's Battles for Europe. New York: Scribner's, 1971.
- Thies, Jochen. Hitler's Plans for Global Domination: Nazi Architecture and Ultimate War Aims. New York: Berghahn Books, 2012.
- Toland, John. Adolf Hitler. Garden City, NY: Doubleday, 1977.
- Trevor-Roper, Hugh, ed. Hitler's Secret Conversations, 1941–1944. New York: Octagon, 1981.
- Trevor-Roper, Hugh. The Last Days of Hitler. London: Collier, 1962, [1947].
- Turner, Henry Ashby. Hitler's Thirty Days to Power: January 1933. London: Bloomsbury, 1996.
- Ullrich, Volker. Hitler: Ascent, 1889–1939. New York: Alfred A. Knopf, 2016.
- Ullrich, Volker. Hitler: Downfall, 1939–1945. New York: Alfred A. Knopf, 2020.
- Victor, George. Hitler: The Pathology of Evil. Washington D.C.: Potomac Books, 2007.
- Waddington, Lorna. Hitler's Crusade. London: I.B. Tauris, 2007.
- Wagener, Otto. Hitler: Memoirs of a Confidant. New Haven, CT: Yale University Press, 1985.
- Waite, Robert. The Psychopathic God: Adolf Hitler. New York: Da Capo Press, 1993.
- Warlimont, Walter. Inside Hitler's Headquarters, 1939–45. Trans. R.H. Barry. New York: Friedrich A. Praeger, 1966.
- Weikart, Richard. Hitler's Religion: The Twisted Beliefs that Drove the Third Reich. Washington DC: Regnery History, 2016.
- Weinberg, Gerhard. ed. Hitler's Second Book: The Unpublished Sequel to Mein Kampf by Adolf Hitler. Translated by Krista Smith. New York: Enigma, 2003.
- Weingartner, James J. Hitler's Guard: The Story of the Leibstandarte Adolf Hitler, 1933–1945. London & Carbondale: Southern Illinois University Press, 1974.
- Welch, David. Hitler. London : University College of London Press, 1998.
- Williams, John F. Corporal Hitler and the Great War 1914–1918: The List Regiment. London and New York: Frank Cass, 2005.
- Wilson, A.N. Hitler. New York: Basic Books, 2012.
- Zalampas, Michael. Adolf Hitler and the Third Reich in American Magazines, 1923–1939. Bowling Green, OH: Bowling Green State University Popular Press, 1989.

== Holocaust, Nazi ideology, anti-Semitism, and the SS ==
- Abitbol, Michel. The Jews of North Africa During the Second World War. Trans. Catherine Tehany Zentels. Detroit: Wayne State University Press, 1989.
- Abrahamsen, Samuel. Norway's Response to the Holocaust: A Historical Perspective. New York: Holocaust Library, 1991.
- Adler, Jacques. The Jews of Paris and the Final Solution: Communal Response and Internal Conflicts, 1940–1944. New York: Oxford University Press, 1987.
- Allen, Michael Thad. The Business of Genocide: The SS, Slave Labor, and the Concentration Camps. Chapel Hill: University of North Carolina Press, 2002.
- Alpert, Nachum. The Destruction of Slonim Jewry: The Story of the Jews of Slonim during the Holocaust. Washington DC: United States Holocaust Museum, 1990.
- Alquen, Gunter d'. Die SS, Geschichte, Aufgabe und Organisation der Schutzstaffeln der NSDAP. Berlin: Junker und Dunnhaupt Verlag, 1939.
- Altshuler, David S. Hitler's War Against the Jews: The Holocaust. New York: Behrman House, 1978
- Aly, Götz, and Susanne Heim. Architects of Annihilation: Auschwitz and the Logic of Destruction. Translated by A. G. Blunden. Princeton, NJ: Princeton University Press, 2003.
- Aly, Götz, et al. Cleansing the Fatherland: Nazi Medicine and Racial Hygiene. Baltimore, MD: Johns Hopkins University Press, 1994.
- Aly, Götz. Final Solution: Nazi Population Policy and the Murder of the European Jews. New York: Oxford University Press, 1999.
- Aly, Götz. Why the Germans? Why the Jews?: Envy, Race Hatred, and the Prehistory of the Holocaust. New York: Metropolitan Books, 2014.
- Aly, Götz. Europe Against the Jews, 1880–1945. New York: Metropolitan Books, 2020.
- Angrick, Andrej, and Peter Klein. The 'Final Solution' in Riga: Exploitation and Annihilation. New York and Oxford: Berghahn Books, 2012.
- Annas, George, and Michael A. Grodin, eds. The Nazi Doctors and the Nuremberg Code. New York: Oxford University Press, 1992.
- Arad, Yitzhak. Belzec, Sobibór, Treblinka: The Operation Reinhard Death Camps. Bloomington: Indiana University Press, 1987.
- Arad, Yitzhak, et al. (eds.) Documents on the Holocaust. Lincoln: University of Nebraska Press, 1999.
- Arad, Yitzhak. Ghetto in Flames: The Struggle and Destruction of the Jews in Vilna in the Holocaust. New York: Holocaust Library, 1982.
- Arad, Yitzhak, et al., eds. Documents on the Holocaust, Selected Sources on the Destruction of Jews in Germany, Austria, Poland and the Soviet Union. Jerusalem: Yad Vashem, 1981.
- Arad, Yitzhak, et al., eds. The Einsatzgruppen Reports. Selections from the Dispatches of the Nazi Death Squads’ Campaign against the Jews in Occupied Territories of the Soviet Union, July 1941–January 1943. New York: Holocaust Library, 1989.
- Arad, Yitzhak. The Holocaust in the Soviet Union. Lincoln, NE: University of Nebraska Press, 2009.
- Arendt, Hannah. Anti-Semitism. New York: Harcourt, Brace & World, 1968.
- Arendt, Hannah. Eichmann in Jerusalem: A Report on the Banality of Evil. New York: Viking, 1969.
- Aronsfeld, Caesar C. The Text of the Holocaust: A Study of Nazi Extermination Propaganda, 1919–1945. Marblehead, MA: Micah Publications, 1985.
- Aronson, Shlomo. The Beginnings of the Gestapo System: The Bavarian Model in 1933. Jerusalem: Israel University Press, 1969.
- Aziz, Philippe. Doctors of Death. 3 vols. Geneva: Ferni Publishing, 1976.
- Bamberger, Ib Nathan. The Viking Jews: A History of the Jews of Denmark. New York: Shengold Publishers, 1983.
- Bankier, David, ed. Probing the Depths of German Antisemitism: Public Opinion under Nazism, 1933–1941. New York: Berghan Books, 2000.
- Barenbaum, Michael. Witness to the Holocaust. New York: HarperCollins, 1997.
- Bartov, Omer. Germany's War and the Holocaust: Disputed Histories. Ithaca: Cornell University Press, 2003.
- Bartov, Omer. Mirrors of Destruction: War, Genocide, and Modern Identity. New York: Oxford University Press, 2002.
- Bartov, Omer. Murder in Our Midst: The Holocaust, Industrial Killing, and Representation. New York: Oxford University Press, 1996.
- Bartov, Omer. The Holocaust: Origins, Implementation, Aftermath (Rewriting Histories). New York: Routledge, 2000.
- Bauer, Yehuda. A History of the Holocaust. New York: Franklin Watts, 1982.
- Bauer, Yehuda. Rethinking the Holocaust. New Haven: Yale University Press, 2001.
- Bauer, Yehuda. The Holocaust in Historical Perspective. Seattle: University of Washington Press, 1978.
- Bauman, Zygmunt. Modernity and the Holocaust. Ithaca, N.Y.: Cornell University Press, 1989.
- Baumslag, Naomi. Murderous Medicine: Nazi Doctors, Human Experimentation, and Typhus. Westport, Conn.: Praeger Publishers, 2005.
- Benbassa, Esther. The Jews of France: A History from Antiquity to the Present. Princeton, NJ: Princeton University Press, 1999.
- Benz, Wolfgang. The Holocaust: A German Historian Examines the Genocide. New York: Columbia University Press, 1999.
- Benz, Wolfgang, and Barbara Distell. Sklavenarbeit im KZ. Dachau: Dachauer Hefte, 1986.
- Béon, Yves. Planet Dora: A Memoir of the Holocaust and the Birth of the Space Age. New York: Westview Press, 1997.
- Beorn, Waitman W. Marching into Darkness: The Wehrmacht and the Holocaust in Belarus. Cambridge, MA: Harvard University Press, 2014.
- Berenbaum, Michael, ed. Mosaic of Victims: Non-Jews Persecuted and Murdered by the Nazis. New York: New York University Press, 1990.
- Berenbaum, Michael. The World Must Know: The History of the Holocaust as Told in the United States Holocaust Memorial Museum. New York: Little Brown, 1993.
- Berenbaum, Michael. Witness to the Holocaust: An Illustrated Documentary History of the Holocaust in the Words of Its Victims, Perpetrators and Bystanders. New York: HarperCollins, 1997.
- Berenbaum, Michael, and Abraham Peck, eds. The Holocaust and History: The Known, the Unknown, the Disputed, and the Reexamined. Bloomington: Indiana University Press, 1998.
- Bergen, Bernard J. The Banality of Evil: Hannah Arendt and “The Final Solution.” Lanham, MD: Rowman & Littlefield, 1998.
- Bergen, Doris L. War and Genocide: A Concise History of the Holocaust. 2nd ed. Lanham: Rowman and Littlefield, 2009.
- Bernadac, Christian. The Death Train. Paris and Geneva: Ferni, 1978.
- Bernadac, Christian. Camp for Women: Ravensbrück. Paris and Geneva: Ferni Publishing House, 1978.
- Bialas, Wolgang, and Lothar Fritze. Nazi Ideology and Ethics. Newcastle upon Tyne: Cambridge Scholars Publishing, 2014.
- Black, Edwin. IBM and the Holocaust: The Strategic Alliance between Nazi Germany and America’s Most Powerful Corporation. New York: Crown Publishers, 2001.
- Black, Jeremy. The Holocaust: History and Memory. Bloomington: Indiana University Press, 2016.
- Blandford, Edmund L. SS Intelligence. Edison, NJ: Castle Books, 2001.
- Bloxham, Donald. Genocide on Trial: War Crimes Trials and the Formation of Holocaust History and Memory. Oxford: Oxford University Press, 2001.
- Bloxham, Donald. The Final Solution: A Genocide. Oxford: Oxford University Press, 2009.
- Bock, Gisela. Genozid und Geschlecht. Jüdische Frauen im nationalsozialistischen Lagersystem [Genocide and Gender. Jewish Women in the National Socialist Camp System]. Frankfurt am Main and New York: Campus, 2005.
- Borowski, Tadeusz. This Way to the Gas, Ladies and Gentlemen, and Other Stories. (Translated from the Polish). New York: Viking Press, 1967.
- Botwinick, Rita. A History of the Holocaust: From Ideology to Annihilation. Englewood Cliffs, N.J.: Prentice Hall, 1996.
- Brachfeld, Sylvain. A Gift of Life: The Deportation and the Rescue of the Jews in Occupied Belgium (1940–1944). Herzliya, Belgium: Institute for the Research on Belgian Judaism, 2007.
- Braham, Randolph L. The Politics of Genocide: The Holocaust in Hungary. New York: Columbia University Press, 1981.
- Braham, Randolph L. The Destruction of Hungarian Jewry: A Documentary Account. 2 vols. New York: Columbia University Press, 1963.
- Braham, Randolph L. The Hungarian Labor Service System, 1939–1945. Boulder, CO: East European Quarterly, 1977.
- Braham, Randolph L., ed. The Tragedy of Romanian Jewry. New York: The Rosenthal Institute for Holocaust Studies of the City University of New York, 1994.
- Braham, Randolph L. The Politics of Genocide: The Holocaust in Hungary. Detroit: Wayne State University Press, 2000
- Brandon, Ray and Wendy Lower, eds. The Shoah in Ukraine: History, Testimony, Memorialization. Bloomington, IN: Indiana University Press, 2008.
- Bridenthal, Renate, Atina Grossmann, and Marion Kaplan, eds. When Biology Became Destiny: Women in Weimar and Nazi Germany. New York: Monthly Review Press, 1984.
- Bridgman, Jon. The End of the Holocaust: The Liberation of the Camps. Portland, OR: Areopagtica Press, 1990.
- Browder, George C. Foundations of the Nazi Police State: The Formation of Sipo and SD. Lexington, KY: University of Kentucky Press, 2004, [1990].
- Browder, George. Hitler's Enforcers: The Gestapo and the SS Security Service in the Nazi Revolution. New York: Oxford University Press, 1996.
- Brown, Daniel P. The Beautiful Beast: The Life and Times of SS-Aufseherin Irma Grese. Ventura, CA: Golden West Historical Publications, 1996.
- Browning, Christopher R. Collected Memories: Holocaust History and Postwar Testimony. Madison: University of Wisconsin Press, 2004.
- Browning, Christopher R. Fateful Months: Essays on the Emergence of the Final Solution. New York: Holmes & Meier, 1985.
- Browning, Christopher R. Ordinary Men: Reserve Police Battalion 101 and the Final Solution in Poland. New York: Harper Perennial, 1993.
- Browning, Christopher R. The Path to Genocide: Essays on Launching the Final Solution. Cambridge: Cambridge University Press, 1992.
- Browning, Christopher R., and Jürgen Matthäus. The Origins of the Final Solution: The Evolution of Nazi Jewish Policy, September 1939–March 1942. Comprehensive History of the Holocaust. Lincoln: University of Nebraska Press, 2004.
- Browning, Christopher R. Remembering Survival: Inside a Nazi Slave-Labor Camp. New York: W. W. Norton & Company, 2011.
- Brustein, William. The Logic of Evil: The Social Origins of the Nazi Party, 1925–1933. New Haven: Yale University Press, 1996.
- Buggeln, Marc. Slave Labor in Nazi Concentration Camps. New York: Oxford University Press, 2014
- Burleigh, Michael. Death and Deliverance: “Euthanasia” in Germany, 1900–1945. Cambridge: Cambridge University Press, 1994.
- Burleigh, Michael. Ethics and Extermination: Reflections on Nazi Genocide. New York: Cambridge University Press, 1997.
- Burleigh, Michael. Germany Turns Eastwards: A Study of ‘Ostforschung’ in the Third Reich. Cambridge: Cambridge University Press, 1988.
- Burleigh, Michael, and Wolfgang Wipperman. The Racial State. Germany 1933–1945. New York: Cambridge University Press, 1991.
- Burrin, Philippe. Hitler and the Jews: The Genesis of the Holocaust. London: Edward Arnold, 1994.
- Burrin, Philippe. Nazi Anti-Semitism: From Prejudice to the Holocaust. New York: New Press, 2005.
- Butler, Rupert. An Illustrated History of the Gestapo. Osceola, WI: Motorbooks International, 1993.
- Butnaru, I. C. The Silent Holocaust: Romania and Its Jews. Westport, CT: Greenwood Press, 1992.
- Caracciolo, Nicola. Uncertain Refuge: Italy and the Jews During the Holocaust. Trans. Florette Rechnitz Koffler and Richard Koffler. Urbana and Chicago: University of Illinois Press, 1995.
- Caron, Vicki. Uneasy Asylum: France and the Jewish Refugee Crisis, 1933–1942. Stanford, CA: Stanford University Press, 1999.
- Carp, Matatias. Holocaust in Romania: Facts and Documents on the Annihilation of Romania's Jews, 1940–44. Budapest: Primor, 1994.
- Cecil, Robert. The Myth of the Master Race: Alfred Rosenberg and Nazi Ideology. New York: Dodd Mead & Company, 1972.
- Central Commission for Investigation of German Crimes in Poland. German Crimes in Poland. New York: Howard Fertig, 1982.
- Cernyak-Spatz, Susan E. German Holocaust Literature. Rev. ed. New York: Peter Lang, 1989.
- Cesarani, David, ed. The Final Solution: Origins and Implementation. London: Routledge, 1984.
- Cesarani, David, and Paul A. Levine. Bystanders to the Holocaust: A Re-Evaluation. London: Frank Cass, 2002.
- Cesarani, David. Holocaust: Critical Concepts in Historical Studies. 6 vols. London: Routledge, 2004.
- Cesarani, David. Final Solution: The Fate of the Jews, 1933–1949. New York: St. Martin's Press, 2016.
- Chamberlin, Brewster S., Marcia Feldman, and Robert H. Abzug. The Liberation of the Nazi Concentration Camps 1945: Eyewitness Accounts of the Liberators. Washington, D.C.: United States Holocaust Memorial Council, 1987.
- Chapoutot, Johann. Greeks, Romans, Germans: How the Nazis Usurped Europe's Classical Past. Oakland, CA: University of California Press, 2016.
- Chapoutot, Johann. The Law of Blood: Thinking and Acting as a Nazi. London and Cambridge, MA: The Belknap Press of Harvard University Press, 2018.
- Chary, Frederick B. The Bulgarian Jews and the Final Solution, 1940–1944. Pittsburgh: University of Pittsburgh Press, 1972.
- Chartock, Roselle and Spender, Jack, eds. The Holocaust Years: Society on Trial. New York: Bantam, 1978.
- Clay, Catrine, and Michael Leapman. Master Race: The Lebensborn Experiment in Nazi Germany. London: Hodder & Stoughton, 1995.
- Cohen, Richard. The Burden of Conscience: French Jewish Leadership during the Holocaust. Bloomington: Indiana University Press, 1987.
- Cohn, Norman. Warrant for Genocide: The Myth of the Jewish World Conspiracy and the Protocols of the Elders of Zion. New York: Harper & Row, 1967.
- Carl Müller Frøland, Nazi Universe. Rajmangal Publishers, India, 2023
- Cole, Tim. Holocaust City: The Making of a Jewish Ghetto. New York: Routledge, 2003.
- Combs, William L. The Voice of the SS: A History of the SS Journal “Das Schwarze Korps”. New York: P. Lang, 1986.
- Confino, Alon. Foundational Pasts: The Holocaust as Historical Understanding. Cambridge and New York: Cambridge University Press, 2011.
- Confino, Alon. A World Without Jews: The Nazi Imagination from Persecution to Genocide. New Haven and London: Yale University Press, 2014.
- Constanza, Mary. The Living Witness: Art in the Concentration Camps and Ghettos. New York: Free Press, 1982.
- Cook, Stan & Bender, Roger James. Leibstandarte SS Adolf Hitler: Uniforms, Organization, & History. San Jose, CA: R. James Bender Publishing, 1994.
- Crankshaw, Edward. Gestapo: Instrument of Tyranny. New York: Viking Press, 1956.
- Czarnecki, Joseph. Last Traces: The Lost Art of Auschwitz. New York: Atheneum, 1989.
- Czech, Danuta. Auschwitz Chronicle, 1939–1945. New York: Henry Holt, 1990.
- Dams, Carsten, and Michael Stolle. The Gestapo: Power and Terror in the Third Reich. New York: Oxford University Press, 2014.
- Davies, Norman, and Antony Polonsky. Jews in Eastern Poland and the USSR 1939–46. New York: St. Martins' Press, 1991.
- Dawidowicz, Lucy S., ed. A Holocaust Reader. New York: Behrman House, 1976.
- Dawidowicz, Lucy S. The Holocaust and the Historians. Cambridge, Mass.: Harvard University Press, 1981.
- Dawidowicz, Lucy S. The War Against the Jews: 1933–1945. New York: Bantam Books Inc., 1975.
- Desbois, Fr. Patrick. The Holocaust by Bullets. New York: Palgrave Macmillan, 2008.
- Dedijer, Vladimir, ed. The Yugoslav Auschwitz and the Vatican. Buffalo and New York: Prometheus Books, 1992.
- Delarue, Jacques. The Gestapo: A History of Horror. New York: Skyhorse, 2008.
- Des Pres, Terrence. The Survivor: An Anatomy of Life in the Death Camps. New York: Oxford University Press, 1976.
- Dicks, Henry V. Licensed Mass Murder: A Socio-Psychological Study of Some SS Killers. New York: Basic Books, 1972.
- Diner, Dan. Beyond the Conceivable: Studies on Germany, Nazism, and the Holocaust. Berkeley, CA: University of California Press, 2000.
- Dobroszycki, Lucjan. The Chronicle of the Lodz Ghetto, 1941–1944. New Haven, CT: Yale University Press, 1984.
- Dobroszycki, Lucjan, and Jeffrey Gurock, eds. The Holocaust in the Soviet Union. Armonk, N.Y.: M. E. Sharpe, 1993.
- Donat, Alexander. The Holocaust Kingdom, A Memoir. New York: Holt, Rinehart & Winston, 1965.
- Donat, Alexander, ed. The Death Camp Treblinka. New York: Holocaust Publications, 1979.
- Dumont, Louis. German Ideology: From France to Germany and Back. Chicago: University of Chicago Press, 1994.
- Dwork, Deborah, and Robert Jan Van Pelt. Holocaust: A History. New York: W. W. Norton & Company, 2002.
- Efron, John. Defenders of the Race: Jewish Doctors and Race Science in Fin de Siècle Europe. New Haven: Yale University Press, 1994.
- Ehrenreich, Eric. The Nazi Ancestral Proof: Genealogy, Racial Science, and the Final Solution. Bloomington: Indiana University Press, 2007.
- Eibeshitz, Jehoshua, and Anna Eibeshitz, comp. and trans. Women in the Holocaust. New York: Remember, 1993.
- Eisenberg, Azriel. The Lost Generation: Children in the Holocaust. Princeton, NJ: Pilgrim, 1982.
- Eisenberg, Azriel. Witness to the Holocaust. Princeton, NJ: Pilgrim Press, 1981.
- Ericksen, Robert P. Complicity in the Holocaust: Churches and Universities in Nazi Germany. New York: Cambridge University Press, 2011.
- Ezergailis, Andrew. The Holocaust in Latvia, 1941–1944: The Missing Center. Washington, D.C.: United States Holocaust Memorial Museum, 1996.
- Favez, Jean-Claude. The Red Cross and the Holocaust. Cambridge, MA: Harvard University Press, 1999.
- Feig, Konnilyn G. Hitler's Death Camps: The Sanity of Madness. New York: Holmes & Meier, 1981.
- Fein, Helen. Accounting for Genocide: National Response and Jewish Victimization during the Holocaust. Chicago: University of Chicago Press, 1984.
- Feinstein, Stephen, ed. Witness and Legacy: Contemporary Art About the Holocaust. Minneapolis: Lerner, 1995.
- Feldman, Gerald D., and Wolfgang Seibel, eds. Networks of Nazi Persecution: Bureaucracy, Business, and the Organization of the Holocaust. New York: Berghahn Books, 2004.
- Ferencz, Benjamin. Less than Slaves: Jewish Forced Labor and the Quest for Compensation. Cambridge: Harvard University Press, 1979.
- Fischer, Klaus. The History of an Obsession: German Judeophobia and the Holocaust. New York: Continuum, 1998.
- Flaherty, T. H. The Third Reich: The SS. Time-Life Books, Inc., (2004) [1988].
- Flam, Gila. Singing for Survival: Songs of the Lodz Ghetto, 1940–1945. Urbana, IL: University of Illinois Press, 1992.
- Fleischmen, Eva, ed. Auschwitz: Beginning of a New Era? Reflections of the Holocaust. New York: Ktav, 1977.
- Fleming, Gerald. Hitler and the Final Solution. Berkeley, CA: UC Press, 1984.
- Freidenreich, Harriet Pass. The Jews of Yugoslavia: A Quest for Community. Philadelphia: Jewish Publication Society of America, 1979.
- Freidlander, Albert H., ed. Out of the Whirlwind: A Reader of Holocaust Literature. New York: Schocken, 1976.
- Friedlander, Henry, and Sybil Milton, eds. Archives of the Holocaust: An International Collection of Selected Documents. 22 vols. New York: Garland, 1990–1995.
- Frieder, Emanuel. To Deliver Their Souls: The Struggle of a Young Rabbi During the Holocaust. New York: Holocaust Library, 1990.
- Friedlander, Henry. The Origins of Nazi Genocide: From Euthanasia to the Final Solution. Chapel Hill: UNC Press, 1995.
- Friedlander, Henry, and Sybil Milton, eds. The Holocaust: Ideology, Bureaucracy, and Genocide. Millwood, NY: Kraus International Publications, 1980.
- Friedländer, Saul. Memory, History and the Extermination of the Jews of Europe. Bloomington: Indiana University Press, 1993.
- Friedländer, Saul. Nazi Germany and the Jews: The Years of Persecution, 1933–1939. Volume 1. New York: HarperCollins, 1998.
- Friedländer, Saul. The Years of Extermination: Nazi Germany and the Jews, 1939–1945. Volume 2. New York: HarperCollins, 2007.
- Friedländer, Saul. Nazi Germany and the Jews, 1933–1945. New York: HarperCollins, 2009. An abridged-combined version of Friedlander's other two works.
- Friedman, Philip. Roads to Extinction: Essays on the Holocaust. Edited by Ada June Friedman. New York: Jewish Publication Society, 1980.
- Friedrich, Otto. The Kingdom of Auschwitz. New York: HarperCollins, 1994.
- Frøland, Carl Müller. Understanding Nazi Ideology: The Genesis and Impact of a Political Faith. Translated by John Irons. Jefferson, NC: McFarland & Company, 2020.
- Frosh, Stephen. Hate and the “Jewish Science”: Anti-Semitism, Nazism and Psychoanalysis. Basingstoke, England: Palgrave Macmillan, 2005.
- Fulbrook, Mary. A Small Town near Auschwitz: Ordinary Nazis and the Holocaust. New York: Oxford University Press, 2012.
- Furet, François. Unanswered Questions: Nazi Germany and the Genocide of the Jews. New York: Schocken Books, 1989.
- Gasman, Daniel. The Scientific Origins of National Socialism: Social Darwinism in Ernst Haeckel and the German Monist League. New York: American Elsevier, 1970.
- Gellately, Robert. The Gestapo and German Society: Enforcing Racial Policy, 1933–1945. New York: Oxford University Press, 1990.
- Gerlach, Christian. The Extermination of the European Jews. Cambridge, United Kingdom: Cambridge University Press, 2016.
- Gerlach, Christian. Kalkulierte Morde: Die deutsche Wirtschaftsund Vernichtungspolitik in Weissrussland, 1941 bis 1944. Hamburg: Hamburger Edition, 1999.
- Geyer, Michael. and Miriam Hansen. “German-Jewish Memory and National Consciousness.” In Holocaust Remembrance: The Shapes of Memory, edited by Geoffrey H. Hartman, 175 –90. Oxford: Blackwell, 1994.
- Gigliotti, Simone, and Barel Lang, eds. The Holocaust: A Reader. Malden, MA: Blackwell, 2005.
- Gilbert, Martin. The Holocaust: Maps and Photographs. New York: Hill and Wang, 1978.
- Gilbert, Martin. Final Journey: The Fate of the Jews in Nazi Europe. New York: Mayflower Books, 1979.
- Gilbert, Martin. The Holocaust: A History of the Jews of Europe During the Second World War. New York: Henry Holt & Co., 1985.
- Gilbert, Martin. Holocaust Journey: Traveling in Search of the Past. New York: Columbia University Press, 1997.
- Gilbert, Martin. The Routledge Atlas of the Holocaust. New York: Routledge, 2002.
- Gilbert, Shirli. Music in the Holocaust: Confronting Life in the Nazi Ghettos and Camps. Oxford Historical Monographs. Oxford: Clarendon Press, Oxford University Press, 2005.
- Gitelman, Zvi, ed. Bitter Legacy: Confronting the Holocaust in the USSR. Bloomington: Indiana University Press, 1997.
- Goldhagen, Daniel Jonah. Hitler's Willing Executioners: Ordinary Germans and the Holocaust. New York: Vintage, 1997.
- Goldstein, Jeffrey. “Anti-Semitism in Occultism and Nazism.” In Michael Marrus, ed., The Nazi Holocaust: Historical Articles on the Destruction of European Jews. Vol. 2, The Origins of the Holocaust. Westport, Conn. and London: Meckler, 1989.
- Golsan, Richard J. Memory, the Holocaust and French Justice: The Bousquet and Touvier Affairs. Trans. Lucy Golsan. Hanover, NH: University Press of New England, 1996.
- Gonen, Jay Y. The Roots of Nazi Psychology: Hitler's Utopian Barbarism. Lexington: University Press of Kentucky, 2000.
- Goodrick-Clarke, Nicholas. The Occult Roots of Nazism: The Ariosophists of Austria and Germany, 1890–1935. Wellingborough: Aquarian Press, 1985.
- Gordon, Sarah. Hitler, Germans and the “Jewish Question.” Princeton, N.J.: Princeton University Press, 1984.
- Graber, G. S. The History of the SS. New York: Grosset and Dunlop, 1978.
- Graml, Hermann. Antisemitism in the Third Reich. Translated by Tim Kirk. Oxford: Blackwell, 1992.
- Grau, Günter, and Claudia Schoppmann. Hidden Holocaust?: Gay and Lesbian Persecution in Germany. Translated by Patrick Camiller. Chicago: Fitzroy Dearborn, 1995.
- Green, Gerald. The Holocaust. New York: Bantam Books, 1978.
- Grobman, Alex and Landes, Daniel, eds. Critical Issues of the Holocaust. New York: Rossel Books, 1983.
- Gross, Jan T. Neighbors: The Destruction of the Jewish Community in Jedwabne, Poland. New York: Penguin Books, 2002.
- Gross, Jan, ed. The Holocaust in Occupied Poland: New Findings and New Interpretations. Frankfurt am Main: Peter Lang, 2012.
- Grunberger, Richard. Hitler’s SS. New York: Dorset Press 1993.
- Grynberg, Michal, ed. Words to Outlive Us: Eyewitness Accounts from the Warsaw Ghetto. New York: Metropolitan Books/ Henry Holt, 2002.
- Gutman, Israel, ed. Encyclopedia of the Holocaust. New York: Macmillan, 1990.
- Gutman, Israel and Michael Berenbaum. Anatomy of the Auschwitz Death Camp. Bloomington, IN: Indiana University Press, 1998.
- Gutman, Yisrael, and Livia Rothkirchen, eds. The Catastrophe of European Jewry. Jerusalem: Yad Vashem, 1976.
- Gutman, Yisrael, and Avital Saf, eds. The Nazi Concentration Camps: Structure and Aims: The Image of the Prisoner, the Jews in the Camps. Jerusalem: Proceedings of the Fourth Yad Vashem International Historical Conference, 1984.
- Gutman, Yisrael, and Shmuel Krakowski, eds. Unequal Victims: Poles and Jews during World War II. New York: Holocaust Library, 1986.
- Gutmann, Martin R. Building a Nazi Europe: The SS's Germanic Volunteers. Cambridge and New York: Cambridge University Press, 2017
- Haar, Ingo and Michael Fahlbusch, eds. German Scholars and Ethnic Cleansing, 1919–1945. New York: Berghan Books, 2005.
- Hackett, David, ed. The Buchenwald Report. Boulder, Colo.: Westview Press, 1995.
- Hale, Christopher. Hitler's Foreign Executioners: Europe's Dirty Secret. Stroud: History Press, 2011.
- Harding, Thomas. Hanns and Rudolf: The German Jew and the Hunt for the Kommandant of Auschwitz. New York: Simon & Schuster, 2013.
- Harmidarow, Walter J. The Final Solution. Shelburne, Ontario: Battered Silicon Dispatch Box, 1998.
- Hartman, Geoffrey, ed. Holocaust Remembrance: The Shapes of Memory. Oxford: Blackwell, 1994.
- Hartmann, Geoffry. The Longest Shadow: In the Aftermath of the Holocaust. Bloomington: Indiana University Press, 1996.
- Harvey, Elizabeth. Women and the Nazi East: Agents and Witnesses of Germanization. New Haven, CT: Yale University Press, 2003.
- Hayes, Peter, ed. Lessons and Legacies: The Meaning of the Holocaust in a Changing World. Evanston, IL: Northwestern University Press, 1991.
- Hayes, Peter. Why? Explaining the Holocaust. New York and London: W.W. Norton & Co., 2017.
- Heger, Heinz. The Men with the Pink Triangle: The True Life and Death Story of Homosexuals in the Nazi Death Camps. Boston: Alyson Publications, 1994.
- Hellbeck, Jochen. World Enemy No. 1: Nazi Germany, Soviet Russia, and the Fate of the Jews. New York: Penguin Books, 2025.
- Heller, Celia S. On the Edge of Destruction: Jews of Poland between the Two World Wars. Detroit: Wayne State University Press, 1994.
- Hellman, Peter, and Lili Meier. The Auschwitz Album. New York: Random House, 1981.
- Helm, Sarah. Ravensbrück: Life and Death in Hitler's Concentration Camp for Women. New York: Nan A. Talese, 2015.
- Herbert, Ulrich, ed. National Socialist Extermination Policies: Contemporary German Perspectives and Controversies. New York: Berghahn Books, 2000.
- Herf, Jeffrey. The Jewish Enemy: Nazi Propaganda during World War II and the Holocaust. Cambridge, MA: The Belknap Press of Harvard University Press, 2008.
- Hertzberg, Arthur. The French Enlightenment and the Jews: The Origins of Modern Antisemitism. New York: Columbia University Press, 1990.
- Hiio, Toomas, Meelis Maripuu, and Indrek Paavle. Estonia, 1940–1945: Reports of the Estonian International Commission for the Investigation of Crimes against Humanity. Tallinn: Kistler-Ritso, 2006.
- Hilberg, Raul, ed. Documents of Destruction: Germany and Jewry, 1933–1945. Chicago: Quadrangle, 1971.
- Hilberg, Raul. Perpetrators, Victims, Bystanders: The Jewish Catastrophe, 1933–1945. New York: HarperCollins, 1992.
- Hilberg, Raul. The Destruction of the European Jews. Chicago: Quadrangle Books, 1967.
- Hillgruber, Andreas. Zweierlei Untergang: Die Zerschlagung des Deutschen Reiches und das Ende des europäischen Judentums. Berlin: Siedler, 1986.
- Hirschfeld, Gerhard, ed. The Policies of Genocide: Jews and Soviet Prisoners of War in Nazi Germany. London: Allen & Unwin, 1986.
- Höhne, Heinz. The Order of the Death's Head: The Story of Hitler's SS. Translated by Richard Barry. London: Penguin Books, 1971.
- Hoffman, Eva. Shtetl: The Life and Death of a Small Town and the World of the Polish Jews. Boston: Houghton Mifflin, 1997.
- Horwitz, Gordon J. Ghettostadt: Łódź and the Making of a Nazi City. Cambridge, MA: The Belknap Press of Harvard University Press, 2008.
- Horwitz, Gordon J. In the Shadow of Death: Living Outside the Gates of Mauthausen. New York: The Free Press, 1990.
- Hüser, Karl. Wewelsburg, 1933–1945. Kultund Terrorstätte der SS. Eine Dokumentation. Paderborn: Verlag Bonifatius-Druckerei, 1982.
- Hutton, Christopher M. Linguistics and the Third Reich: Mother-tongue Fascism, Race, and the Science of Language. New York: Routledge, 1998.
- Hutton, Christopher. Race and the Third Reich: Linguistics, Racial Anthropology and Genetics in the Dialectic of Volk. Cambridge: Cambridge University Press, 2005.
- Ingrao, Christian. Believe and Destroy: Intellectuals in the SS War Machine. Cambridge and Malden, MA: Polity Press, 2013.
- Insdorf, Annette. Indelible Shadows: Film and the Holocaust. 3rd ed. Cambridge: Cambridge University Press, 2003.
- International Military Tribunal. Trial of the Major War Criminals before the International Military Tribunal, Nuremberg, 14 November 1945 to 1 October 1946. 42 vols. Nuremberg: International Military Tribunal, 1947–1949. See the U.S. Library of Congress page at: Nazi War Criminals Trial
- Ioanid, Radu. The Holocaust in Romania. Chicago: Dee, 2000.
- Johnson, Eric. Nazi Terror: The Gestapo, Jews, and Ordinary Germans. New York: Basic Books, 1999.
- Johnson, Eric, and Karl-Heinz Reuband. What We Knew: Terror, Mass Murder, and Everyday Life in Nazi Germany. New York: Basic Books, 2006.
- Kamenetsky, Ihor. Secret Nazi Plans for Eastern Europe: A Study of Lebensraum Policies. New York: Bookman Associates, 1961.
- Kaplan, Marion. Between Dignity and Despair: Jewish Life in Nazi Germany. New York, Oxford: Oxford University Press, 1998.
- Katz, Steven. The Holocaust in Historical Context. Vol. I: The Holocaust and Mass Death before the Modern Age. New York: Oxford University Press, 1994.
- Kay, Alex J. Exploitation, Resettlement, Mass Murder: Political and Economic Planning for German Occupation Policy in the Soviet Union. New York: Berghahn, 2006.
- Kay Alex J. Empire of Destruction: A History of Nazi Mass Killing. New Haven and London: Yale University Press, 2021.
- Kendall, Harvey. The Yugoslav Auschwitz and the Vatican. Buffalo, NY: Prometheus Books, 1990.
- Kenrick, Donald, and Grattan Puxon. The Destiny of Europe's Gypsies. New York: Basic Books, 1972.
- Kellogg, Michael. The Russian Roots of Nazism: White Emigrés and the Making of National Socialism, 1917–1945. New York: Cambridge University Press, 2005.
- Klarsfeld, Serge, ed. Documents Concerning the Destruction of the Jews of Grodno 1941–1944. New York: Beate Klarsfeld Foundation, 1985.
- Klee, Ernst, Willie Dressen, and Volker Riess, eds. “The Good Old Days”: The Holocaust as Seen by Its Perpetrators and Bystanders. New York: Free Press, 1988.
- Klemperer, Victor. I Will Bear Witness: A Diary of the Nazi Years, 1933–1941. Vol. 1. Introduction by Martin Chalmers. New York: Modern Library, 1999.
- Klemperer, Victor. I Will Bear Witness: A Diary of the Nazi Years, 1942–1945. Vol. 2. Translation by Martin Chalmers. New York: Modern Library, 2001.
- Knowles, Anne K., Tim Cole, and Alberto Giordano, eds. Geographies of the Holocaust (The Spatial Humanities). Bloomington: Indiana University Press, 2014.
- Koehl, Robert. The Black Korps: The Structure and Power Struggles of the Nazi SS. Madison, WI: University of Wisconsin Press, 1983.
- Kogon, E., H. Langbein, and A. Rückerl, eds. Nazi Mass Murder: A Documentary History of the Use of Poison Gas. New Haven: Yale University Press, 1993.
- Kogon, Eugen. The Theory and Practice of Hell: The German Concentration Camps and the System behind Them. New York: Farrar, Straus and Giroux, 2006.
- Kolb, Eberhard. Bergen-Belsen: Vom “Aufenthaltslager” zum Konzentrationslager, 1943–1945. Göttingen: Vandenhoeck & Ruprecht, 1996.
- Koonz, Claudia. "Between Memory and Oblivion: Concentration Camps in German Memory." In Commemorations: The Politics of National Identity, edited by John Gillis, 258–280. Princeton, NJ: Princeton University Press, 1994.
- Koonz, Claudia. The Nazi Conscience. Cambridge, Mass.: The Belknap Press of Harvard University Press, 2003.
- Kranzler, David. Thy Brother's Blood: The Orthodox Jewish Response during the Holocaust. New York: Mesorah Publications, 1987.
- Krausnik, Helmut, and Martin Broszat. Anatomy of the SS State. London: Paladin, 1973.
- Kühl, Stefan. The Nazi Connection: Eugenics, American Racism, and German National Socialism. New York: Oxford University Press, 1994.
- Kuriloff, Emily. Contemporary Psychoanalysis and the Legacy of the Third Reich. History, Memory, Tradition. New York and London: Routledge, 2013.
- Kushner, Tony. The Holocaust and the Liberal Imagination: A Social and Cultural History. Oxford: Blackwell, 1994.
- LaCapra, Dominick. History and Memory after Auschwitz. Ithaca: Cornell University Press, 1998.
- Lagnado, Lucette, and Sheila Cohn Dekel. Children of the Flames: Dr. Josef Mengele and the Untold Story of the Twins of Auschwitz. New York: William Morrow, 1991.
- Lane, Barbara Miller, and Leila J. Rupp. Nazi Ideology before 1933: A Documentation. Austin, TX: University of Texas Press, 1978.
- Lang, Berel. Act and Idea in the Nazi Genocide. Chicago and London: University of Chicago Press, 1990.
- Langer, Lawrence L. Holocaust Testimonies: The Ruins of Memory. New Haven and London: Yale University Press, 1991.
- Langerbein, Hans. Hitler’s Death Squads: The Logic of Mass Murder. College Station: Texas A&M Press, 2004.
- Lanzmann, Claude. Shoah: An Oral History of the Holocaust. New York: Pantheon Books, 1985.
- Laqueur, Walter. The Terrible Secret: An Investigation into the Suppression of Information about Hitler’s “Final Solution.” London: Weidenfeld And Nicolson, 1980.
- Lazare, Lucien. Rescue as Resistance: How Jewish Organizations Fought the Holocaust in France. New York: Columbia University Press, 1996.
- Le Chene, Evelyn. Mauthausen: The History of a Death Camp. London: Methuen, 1971.
- Lederer, Zdenek. Ghetto Theresienstadt. New York: Howard Fertig, 1983.
- Lederer, Zdneck, ed. The Crimes of the Germans and Their Collaborators Against the Jews of Jugoslavia. Belgrade: Zdneck, 1953.
- Lengyel, Olga. Five Chimneys: The Story of Auschwitz. Chicago: Academy Chicago Publishers, 1995.
- Levendel, Isaac., and Bernard Weisz. Hunting Down the Jews: Vichy, the Nazis and Mafia Collaborators in Provence, 1942–1944. Intro by Serge Klarsfeld. New York: Enigma Books, 2012.
- Levi, Primo. Survival in Auschwitz. New York: Collier, 1958.
- Levin, Nora. The Holocaust, The Destruction of European Jewry, 1933–1945. New York: Schocken Books, 1973.
- Levin, Nora. The Holocaust Years: The Nazi Destruction of European Jewry, 1933–1945. Florida: Frieger Publishing Co., Inc., 1990.
- Levine, Hillel. Economic Origins of Antisemitism: Poland and Its Jews in the Early Modern Period. New Haven: Yale University Press, 1991.
- Lewy, Guenter. The Nazi Persecution of the Gypsies. New York: Oxford University Press, 2000.
- Lewy, Guenter. Perpetrators: The World of the Holocaust Killers. Oxford and New York: Oxford University Press, 2017.
- Lifton, Robert Jay. The Nazi Doctors: Medical Killing and the Psychology of Genocide. New York: Basic Books, 1986.
- Lindemann, Albert. Esau's Tears: Modern Anti-Semitism and the Rise of the Jews. Cambridge: Cambridge University Press, 1997.
- Lipstadt, Deborah. Beyond Belief: The American Press and the Coming of the Holocaust, 1933–1945. New York: Free Press, 1986.
- Longerich, Peter. Holocaust: The Nazi Persecution and Murder of the Jews. New York: Oxford University Press, 2010.
- Lower, Wendy. Hitler's Furies: German Women in the Nazi Killing Fields. Boston: Houghton Mifflin Harcourt, 2013.
- Lower, Wendy. Nazi Empire-Building and the Holocaust in Ukraine. Chapel Hill, University of North Carolina Press, 2005.
- Lozowick, Yaacov, and Haim Watzman. Hitler's Bureaucrats: The Nazi Security Police and the Banality of Evil. London: Continuum, 2002.
- Lukas, Richard. Did the Children Cry: Hitler's War against Jewish and Polish Children, 1939–1945. New York: Hippocrene, 1994.
- Lukas, Richard. Forgotten Holocaust: The Poles under German Occupation, 1939–1945. New York: Hippocrene, 1997.
- Machlejd, Wanda. Experimental Operations on Prisoners of Ravensbrück Concentration Camp. Poznan: Wydawnictwo Zachodine Publishing, 1960.
- Maier, Charles S. The Unmasterable Past: History, Holocaust, and German National Identity. Cambridge, Massachusetts: Harvard University Press, 1988.
- Mankowitz, Zeev W. Life between Memory and Hope: The Survivors of the Holocaust in Occupied Germany. Cambridge: Cambridge Univ. Press, 2002.
- Marcuse, Harold. Legacies of Dachau: The Uses and Abuses of a Concentration Camp, 1933–2003. Cambridge: Cambridge University Press, 2004.
- Marrus, Michael R. The Holocaust in History. Hanover, New Hampshire: University Press of New England, 1987.
- Marrus, Michael, R., ed. The Nazi Holocaust: Historical Articles on the Destruction of European Jews. 9 vols. Westport, Conn.: Meckler, 1989.
- Marrus, Michael R., and Robert Paxton. Vichy France and the Jews. New York: Basic Books, 1981.
- Mayer, Arno. Why Did the Heavens Not Darken?: The “Final Solution” in History. London & New York: Verso Publishing, 2012.
- Mazower, Mark. Hitler's Empire: How the Nazis Ruled Europe. New York: Penguin Books, 2009.
- McDonough, Frank. The Gestapo: The Myth and Reality of Hitler's Secret Police. New York: Skyhorse Publishing, 2017.
- McKale, Donald M. Hitler's Shadow War: The Holocaust and World War II. New York: Cooper Square Press, 2002.
- McMillan, Dan. How Could This Happen: Explaining the Holocaust. New York: Basic Books, 2014.
- Meltzer, Milton. Never to Forget: The Jews of the Holocaust. New York: Dell, 1977
- Mendolsohn, Daniel. The Lost: A Search for Six of Six Million. New York: Harper, 2006.
- Mendelsohn, John, and Donald Detweiler, eds. The Holocaust: Selected Documents in Eighteen Volumes. 18 vols. New York: Garland, 1982.
- Michaelis, Meir. Mussolini and the Jews. German-Italian Relations and the Jewish Question in Italy, 1922–1945. Oxford & New York: Oxford University Press, 1978.
- Michel, Jean with Louis Nucéra. Dora: The Nazi Concentration Camp Where Modern Space Technology Was Born and 30,000 Prisoners Died. Trans. Jennifer Kidd. New York: Holt, Rinehart & Winston, 1980.
- Mikhman, Dan. Holocaust Historiography: A Jewish Perspective: Conceptualizations, Terminology, Approaches, and Fundamental Issues. London: Vallentine Mitchell, 2003.
- Miller, Michael. Leaders of the SS and German Police, Vol. 1. R. James Bender Publishing, 2006.
- Miller, Michael. Leaders of the SS and German Police, Vol. 2. R. James Bender Publishing, 2015.
- Miller, Richard. Nazi Justice: Law of the Holocaust. Westport, Conn.: Praeger, 1995.
- Mineau, Andre. SS Thinking and the Holocaust. Amsterdam and New York: Rodopi, 2012.
- Mollo, Andrew. Uniforms of the SS, Collected Edition Volumes: 1–6. Motorbooks Intl., 1997.
- Moltmann, Bernhard, et al., eds. Erinnerung: Zur Gegenwart des Holocaust in Deutschland-West und Deutschland-Ost. Frankfurt am Main: Haag Herchen Verlag, 1993.
- Moore, Bob. Victims and Survivors: The Nazi Persecution of the Jews in the Netherlands, 1940–1945. New York: Arnold Press, 1997.
- Morrison, Jack G. Ravensbruck: Everyday Life in a Women's Concentration Camp 1939–45. Princeton, NJ: Markus Wiener Publishers, 2000.
- Morse, Arthur. While Six Million Died: A Chronicle of American Apathy. New York: Random House, 1968.
- Mosse, George L. The Crisis of German Ideology: Intellectual Origins of the Third Reich. New York: Howard Fertig, 1964.
- Mosse, George L. Toward the Final Solution: A History of European Racism. New York: Howard Fertig, 1997.
- Muller, Filip. Eyewitness Auschwitz: Three Years in the Gas Chambers. New York: Stein & Day, 1979
- Müller-Hill, Benno. Murderous Science: Elimination by Scientific Selection of Jews, Gypsies and Others, Germany 1933–1945. New York: Oxford University Press, 1988.
- Nahon, Marco. Birkenau: The Camp of Death. Ed. Steve Bowman. Trans. Jacqueline Havaux. Tuscaloosa: University of Alabama Press, 1989.
- Niewyk, Donald; Nicosia, Francis (2000). The Columbia Guide to the Holocaust. Archived from the original on 2009-05-01 – via Questia.
- Niewyk, Donald, ed. The Holocaust: Problems and Perspectives of Interpretation. Boston: Houghton Mifflin, 1997.
- Noakes, J., and G. Pridham, eds. Nazism: A History in Documents and Eyewitness Accounts, 1919–1945. 3 vols. Exeter: University of Exeter Press, 1983–1988.
- Offer, Dalia. Escaping the Holocaust: Illegal Immigration to the Land of Israel, 1939–1944. New York: Oxford University Press, 1990.
- Overesch, Manfred. Buchenwald und die DDR, oder die Suche nach Selbstlegitimation. Göttingen: Vandenhoeck & Ruprecht, 1995.
- Patai, Raphael. The Jews of Hungary: History, Culture, Psychology. Detroit: Wayne State University Press, 1996.
- Paucker, Arnold, ed. Die Juden im Nationalsozialistischen Deutschland / The Jews in Nazi Germany, 1933–1943. Tübingen: J. C. B. Mohr Paul Siebeck, 1986.
- Pauley, Bruce. From Prejudice to Persecution: A History of Austrian Antisemitism. Chapel Hill: University of North Carolina Press, 1992.
- Paulsson, Gunnar S. Secret City: The Hidden Jews of Warsaw. New Haven & London: Yale University Press, 2003.
- Pawełczyńska, Anna. Values and Violence in Auschwitz: A Sociological Analysis. Berkeley: University of California Press, 1980.
- Pentower, Monty. The Jews Were Expendable: Free World Diplomacy and the Holocaust. Urbana: University of Illinois Press, 1983.
- Perechodnik, Calel, ed. Am I a Murderer? Testament of a Jewish Ghetto Policeman. Trans. Frank Fox. Boulder, CO: Westview Press, 1996.
- Peukert, Detlev. Inside Nazi Germany: Conformity, Opposition and Racism in Everyday Life. London: Batsford, 1987. ISBN 0-7134-5217-X.
- Plant, Richard. The Pink Triangle: The Nazi War against Homosexuals. New York: Henry Holt, 1988.
- Poliakov, Leon. A History of Anti-Semitism. 4 vols. New York: Vanguard Press, 1965–1986.
- Poliakov, Leon. Harvest of Hate: The Nazi Program for the Destruction of the Jews of Europe. New York: Holocaust Library, 1979.
- Poliakov, Leon, and Jacques Sabille. Jews under the Italian Occupation. New York: Howard Fertig, 1983.
- Postone, Moishe and Eric Santner, eds. Catastrophe and Meaning: The Holocaust and the Twentieth-Century. Chicago: University of Chicago Press, 2003.
- Poznanski, Renée. Jews in France during World War II (Tauber Institute Series for the Study of European Jewry). London: Brandeis, 2001.
- Press, Bernhard. The Murder of the Jews in Latvia, 1941–1945. Evanston, IL: Northwestern University Press, 2000.
- Pressac, Jean-Claude. Auschwitz: Technique and Operation of the Gas Chambers. Trans. Peter Moss. New York: Beate Klarsfeld Foundation, 1989.
- Presser, Jacob Ashes in the Wind: The Destruction of Dutch Jewry. Detroit: Wayne State University Press, 1988.
- Pringle, Heather. The Master Plan: Himmler's Scholars and the Holocaust. New York: Hyperion, 2006.
- Proctor, Robert. Racial Hygiene: Medicine under the Nazis. Cambridge, MA: Harvard University Press, 1988.
- Pulzer, Peter. Jews and the German State: The Political History of a Minority, 1848–1933. Detroit: Wayne State University Press, 2003.
- Pulzer, Peter. The Rise of Political Antisemitism in Germany and Austria. Cambridge, MA: Harvard University Press, 1988.
- Ramati, Alexander. And the Violins Stopped Playing: The Story of the Gypsy Holocaust. New York: Franklin Watts, 1986.
- Rautkallio, Hannu. Finland and the Holocaust: The Rescue of Finland's Jews. New York: Holocaust Library, 1987.
- Read, Anthony, and David Fisher. Kristallnacht: The Nazi Night of Terror. New York: Random House, 1989.
- Rector, Frank. The Nazi Extermination of Homosexuals. New York: Stein & Day, 1981.
- Rees, Laurence. Auschwitz: A New History. New York: MJF Books, 2005.
- Rees, Laurence. The Holocaust: A New History. New York: Public-Affairs, 2017.
- Reichmann, Eva. Hostages of Civilization: The Social Sources of National Socialist Antisemitism. Westport, Conn.: Greenwood, 1971.
- Reitlinger, Gerald. The Final Solution: The Attempt to Exterminate the Jews of Europe, 1939–1945. New York: A. S. Barnes, 1961.
- Reitlinger, Gerald. The SS: Alibi of a Nation, 1922–1945. New York: Da Capo Press, 1989.
- Rhodes, Richard. Masters of Death: The SS-Einsatzgruppen and the Invention of the Holocaust. New York: Vintage, 2003.
- Rittner, Carol, and John K. Roth, eds. Different Voices: Women and the Holocaust. New York: Paragon House, 1993.
- Roland, Charles. Courage Under Siege: Starvation, Disease, and Death in the Warsaw Ghetto. New York: Oxford University Press, 1992.
- Romans, J. The Jews of Yugoslavia, 1941–1945: Victims of Genocide and Freedom Fighters. Belgrade: Savez Jevrejskih Opstina Jugoslavje, 1982.
- Römer, Ruth. Sprachwissenschaft und Rassenideologie in Deutschland. München: Wilhelm Fink, 1989.
- Rose, Paul Lawrence. German Question – Jewish Question: Revolutionary Antisemitism from Kant to Wagner. Princeton, N.J.: Princeton University Press, 1992.
- Rose, Romani. The Nazi Genocide of the Sinti and Roma. 2nd ed. Heidelberg: Documentary and Cultural Centre of German Sinti and Roma, 1995.
- Roseman, Mark. The Wannsee Conference and the Final Solution: A Reconsideration. New York: Picador, 2003.
- Rosenbaum, Irving J. The Holocaust and Halakhah. New York: Ktav, 1976.
- Roth, John K., and Michael Berenbaum, eds. Holocaust: Religious and Philosophical Implications. New York: Paragon House, 1998.
- Rothchild, Sylvia, ed. Voices from the Holocaust. New York: New American Library, 1981.
- Rothkirchen, Livia. The Jews of Bohemia and Moravia: Facing the Holocaust. Lincoln, NE: University of Nebraska Press, 2005.
- Rubenstein, Richard L., and John Roth. Approaches to Auschwitz: The Holocaust and Its Legacy. Louisville, KY: Westminster John Knox, 2003.
- Rutherford, Phillip. Prelude to the Final Solution: The Nazi Program for Deporting Ethnic Poles, 1939–1941. Lawrence, KS: University Press of Kansas, 2007.
- Rymkiewicz, Jarostaw M. The Final Station: Umschlagplatz. Trans. Nina Taylor. New York: Farrar, Straus & Giroux, 1994.
- Sabin, B. F., ed. Alliance for Murder: The Nazi-Ukrainian Nationalist Partnership in Genocide. New York: Sarpedon-Shapolsky, 1991.
- Sachar, Abram L. The Redemption of the Unwanted: From the Liberation of the Death Camps to the Founding of Israel. New York: St. Martin's Press, 1983.
- Samuel, Maurice. The Great Hatred. New York: Alfred Knopf, 1948.
- Sandberg, Moshe. My Longest Year: In the Hungarian Labor Service and in the Nazi Camps. Jerusalem: Yad Vashem, 1968.
- Schafft, Gretchen Engle. From Racism to Genocide: Anthropology in the Third Reich. Urbana: University of Illinois Press, 2004.
- Schleunes, Karl. The Twisted Road to Auschwitz: Nazi Policy toward German Jews, 1933–1939. Urbana: University of Illinois Press, 1970.
- Schneider, Gertrude. Exile and Destruction: The Fate of Austrian Jews, 1938–1945. Westport, CT: Praeger, 1995.
- Schneider, Gertrude. Journey into Terror: Story of the Riga Ghetto. New York: Ark House, 1979.
- Schneider, Gertrude, ed. The Unfinished Road: Jewish Survivors of Latvia Look Back. Westport, CT: Praeger Publishers, 1991.
- Schoenburger, Gerhard. The Yellow Star: The Persecution of the Jews in Europe, 1933–1945. New York: Bantam, 1973.
- Schwartz, Solomon. The Jews in the Soviet Union. Syracuse, N.Y.: Syracuse University Press, 1951.
- Sciolino, Anthony J. The Holocaust, the Church, and the Law of Unintended Consequences: How Christian Anti-Judaism Spawned Nazi Anti-Semitism. Bloomington, IN: iUniverse, 2012.
- Segev, Tom. Soldiers of Evil: The Commandants of the Nazi Concentration Camps. New York: McGraw Hill, 1987.
- Segev, Tom. The Seventh Million: The Israelis and the Holocaust. New York: Picador 1993.
- Sereny, Gitta. Into That Darkness: From Mercy Killing to Mass Murder. London: Deutsch, 1991.
- Shapiro, Robert Moses, ed. Holocaust Chronicles: Individualizing the Holocaust through Diaries and Other Contemporaneous Personal Accounts. Hoboken, NJ: Ktav Pub Inc., 1999.
- Shaw, Stanford. Turkey and the Holocaust: Turkey's Role in Rescuing Turkish and European Jewry from Nazi Persecution, 1933–1945. New York: New York University Press, 1993.
- Sheck, Raffael. Hitler’s African’s Victims. Cambridge, UK: Cambridge University Press, 2006.
- Smith Woodruff D. The Ideological Origins of Nazi Imperialism. New York: Oxford University Press, 1989.
- Snyder, Timothy. Bloodlands: Europe between Hitler and Stalin. New York: Basic Books, 2010.
- Snyder, Timothy. Black Earth: The Holocaust as History and Warning. New York: Tim Duggan Books, 2015.
- Sofsky, Wolfgang. The Order of Terror: The Concentration Camp. Princeton: Princeton University Press, 1997.
- Soviet Government Statements on Nazi Atrocities. London: Hutchinson & Company, 1946.
- Spector, Shmuel. The Holocaust of Volhynian Jews. Jerusalem: Yad Vashem Publications, 1990.
- Speer, Albert. The Slave State: Heinrich Himmler's Master-plan for SS Supremacy. London: Weidenfeld & Nicolson, 1981.
- Spicer, Kevin P., and Center for Advanced Holocaust Studies. Antisemitism, Christian Ambivalence, and the Holocaust. Bloomington: Indiana University Press, 2007.
- Spitz, Vivien. Doctors from Hell: The Horrific Account of Nazi Experiments on Humans. Boulder, CO: Sentient Publications, 2005.
- Spodheim, Rene. The Silent Holocaust: Romania and Its Jews (Contributions to the Study of World History). New York: Praeger, 1992.
- State of Israel. The Trial of Adolf Eichmann. Record of Proceedings in the District Court of Jerusalem. 9 vols. Jerusalem: State of Israel Ministry of Justice, 1992–1995.
- State Museum of Auschwitz-Birkenau. Death Books from Auschwitz. 3 vols. Munich: K. G. Saur, 1995.
- Steinberg, Jonathan. All or Nothing: The Axis and the Holocaust. London & New York: Routledge, 1992.
- Steiner, Jean-Francois. Treblinka. New York: Simon & Schuster, 1967.
- Steiner, John M. Power Politics and Social Change in National Socialist Germany: A Process of Escalation into Mass Destruction. Atlantic Highlands, NJ: Humanities Press, 1976.
- Steiner, John M. "The SS Yesterday and Today: A Socio-Psychological View". In Survivors, Victims, and Perpetrators: Essays on the Nazi Holocaust, edited by Joel E. Dimsdale. Washington: Hemisphere, 1980.
- Steinweis, Alan E. Studying the Jew: Scholarly Antisemitism in Nazi Germany. Cambridge, Mass.: Harvard University Press, 2006.
- Stern, Fritz. The Politics of Cultural Despair: A Study in the Rise of the Germanic Ideology. Berkeley: UC Press, 1961.
- Stone, Dan, ed. The Historiography of the Holocaust. New York: Palgrave, 2004
- Stone, Dan. The Holocaust: An Unfinished History. New York and Boston: Mariner Books, 2023.
- Strom, Margot Stern and William S Parsons. Facing History and Ourselves: Holocaust and Human Behavior. Watertown, MA: Intentional Educations, 1982.
- Swiebocka, Teresa, ed. Auschwitz: A History in Photographs. Bloomington: Indiana University Press, 1993.
- Sydnor, Jr., Charles W. Soldiers of Destruction: The SS Death’s Head Division 1939–1945. Princeton, NJ: Princeton University Press, 1977.
- Taylor, Simon. Prelude to Genocide: Nazi Ideology and the Struggle for Power. New York: St Martin's Press, 1985.
- Trachtenberg, Joshua. The Devil and the Jews: The Medieval Conception of the Jew and Its Relation to Modern Antisemitism. Philadelphia: Jewish Publication Society, 1983.
- Troller, Norbert. Theresienstadt : Hitler's Gift to the Jews. Chapel Hill, NC: University of North Carolina Press, 1991.
- Trunk, Isaiah. Judenrat: The Jewish Councils in Eastern Europe under Nazi Occupation. Lincoln, NE: University of Nebraska Press, 1996.
- United States Holocaust Memorial Museum. Nazi Ideology and the Holocaust. Washington D.C.: U.S. Holocaust Memorial Museum, 2007.
- United States Library of Congress. Nazi Conspiracy and Aggression. 8 vols. 12 books. Washington, D.C.: U.S. Government Printing Office, 1945–1946.
- Venezia, Shlomo. Inside the Gas Chambers: Eight Months in the Sonderkommando of Auschwitz. Boston: Polity, 2011.
- Wachsmann, Nikolaus, and Jane Caplan. Concentration Camps in Nazi Germany: The New Histories. New York: Routledge, 2010.
- Wachsmann, Nikolaus. KL: A History of the Nazi Concentration Camps. New York: Farrar, Straus and Giroux, 2015.
- Wasserstein, Bernard. Britain and the Jews of Europe, 1939–1945. Oxford: Oxford University Press, 1988.
- Weale, Adrian. Army of Evil: A History of the SS. New York: Caliber Printing, 2012.
- Wegner, Bernd. The Waffen-SS: Organization, Ideology and Function. Blackwell, 1990 [1982].
- Weikart, Richard. From Darwin to Hitler: Evolutionary Ethics, Eugenics, and Racism in Germany. New York: Palgrave Macmillan, 2006.
- Weindling, Paul. Health, Race, and German Politics between National Unification and Nazism, 1870–1945. Cambridge: Cambridge University Press, 1989.
- Weinstein, Fred. The Dynamics of Nazism: Leadership, Ideology and the Holocaust. New York: Academic Press, 1980.
- Weisberg, Richard. Vichy Law and the Holocaust in France. New York: New York University Press, 1996.
- Weiss, John. Ideology of Death: Why the Holocaust Happened in Germany. Chicago: Ivan R. Dee, 1996.
- Weiss, John. The Politics of Hate: Anti-Semitism, History, and the Holocaust in Modern Europe. Chicago: Ivan R. Dee, 2003.
- Weiss, Sheila Faith. The Nazi Symbiosis: Human Genetics and Politics in the Third Reich. Chicago & London: The University of Chicago Press, 2010.
- Weiss-Wendt, Anton, and Rory Yeomans, eds. Racial Science in Hitler's New Europe, 1938–1945. Lincoln, NE: University of Nebraska Press, 2013.
- Welch, David. Nazi Propaganda: The Power and the Limitations. London: Croom Helm, 1983.
- Westermann, Edward B. Hitler’s Police Battalions: Enforcing Racial War in the East. Lawrence: University of Kansas Press, 2005.
- Whitlock, Flint. The Beasts of Buchenwald: Karl & Ilse Koch, Human-Skin Lampshades, and the War-Crimes Trial of the Century. Brule, WI: Cable Publishing, 2011.
- Winnick, Myron. Final Stamp: The Jewish Doctors in the Warsaw Ghetto. Bloomington, IN: Author House, 2007.
- Wistrich, Robert S. Hitler and the Holocaust. New York: Modern Library Chronicles, 2001.
- Wyman, David. The Abandonment of the Jews: America and the Holocaust, 1941–1945. New York: Pantheon, 1984.
- Wytwycky, Bohdan. The Other Holocaust. Washington, D. C.: Novak, 1980.
- Yahil, Leni. "Madagascar – Phantom of a Solution for the Jewish Question." In Jews and Non-Jews in Eastern Europe, ed. George Mosse and Bela Vago, 315–334. New York: Wiley, 1974.
- Yahil, Leni. The Holocaust: The Fate of European Jewry, trans. Ina Friedman and Haya Galai. New York: Oxford University Press, 1990.
- Young, James. The Texture of Memory: Holocaust Memorials and Meaning. New Haven: Yale University Press, 1993.
- Zeman, Z. A. B. Nazi Propaganda. 2nd ed. London: Oxford University Press, 1973.
- Ziegler, Herbert. Nazi Germany's New Aristocracy: The SS Leadership, 1925–1939. Princeton, N.J.: Princeton University Press, 1989.
- Zuccotti, Susan. The Holocaust, the French, and the Jews. New York NY: Basic Books, 1993.
- Zuccotti, Susan. The Italians and the Holocaust: Persecution, Rescue, and Survival. New York: Basic Books, 1987.
- Zuccotti, Susan. Under His Very Windows: The Vatican and the Holocaust in Italy. New Haven, CT: Yale University Press, 2000.

== Leadership ==
- Adams, Henry M., and Robin K. Adams. Rebel Patriot: A Biography of Franz von Papen. Santa Barbara, CA: McNally & Loftin, 1987.
- Asher, Lee. Göring: Air Leader. London: Duckworth Publishing, 1972.
- Bassett, Richard. Hitler’s Spy Chief: The Wilhelm Canaris Betrayal. New York: Pegasus Books, 2011.
- Bewley, Charles H. Hermann Goering and the Third Reich: A Biography based on Family and Official Records. New York: Devin-Adair, 1962.
- Black, Peter R. Ernst Kaltenbrunner: Ideological Soldier of the Third Reich. Princeton, NJ: University of Princeton Press, 1984.
- Braatz, Werner Ernst. Franz von Papen and the Movement of Anschluss with Austria, 1934–1938: An Episode in German Diplomacy. Madison, WI: University of Wisconsin Press, 1953.
- Bramsted, Ernest K. Goebbels and National Socialist Propaganda, 1925–1945. East Lansing, MI: Michigan State Press, 1965.
- Breitman, Richard. The Architect of Genocide: Himmler and the Final Solution. New York: Alfred Knopf, 1991.
- Brelinz, Richard. Architect of Genocide: Himmler and the Final Solution. New York: Knopf, 1991.
- Broszat, Martin. The Hitler State: The Foundation and Development Of The Internal Structure Of The Third Reich. Translated by John W. Hiden. London: Longman, 1981. ISBN 0-582-49200-9.
- Burdick, Charles and Hans-Adolf Jacobsen. The Halder War Diary 1939–1942. New York: Presidio Press, 1988.
- Bytwerk, Randall L. Julius Streicher: The Man who Persuaded a Nation to Hate Jews. London: Dorset Press, 1988.
- Calic, Edouard. Reinhard Heydrich: The Chilling Story of the Man Who Masterminded the Nazi Death Camps. Translated by Lowell Blair. New York: 1982.
- Cecil, Robert. Myth of the Master Race: Alfred Rosenberg and the Nazi Ideology. London: Batsford, 1972.
- Cesarani, David. Eichmann: His Life and Crimes. London: W. Heinemann, 2004.
- Cesarani, David. Becoming Eichmann: Rethinking the Life, Crimes, and Trial of a Desk Murderer. Cambridge, MA: Da Capo Press, 2006.
- Dederichs, Mario. Heydrich: The Face of Evil. Drexel Hill, PA: Casemate, 2009.
- Deschner, Günther. Reinhard Heydrich: A Biography. New York: Stein & Day, 1981.
- Deutsch, Harold C. Hitler and His Generals, the Hidden Crisis, January–June, 1938. Minneapolis: University of Minnesota Press, 1974.
- Fest, Joachim C. The Face of the Third Reich: Portraits of the Nazi Leadership. London: Weidenfeld & Nicolson, 1970.
- Fest, Joachim C. Speer: The Final Verdict. Orlando, FL.: Harcourt, 2001.
- Fraenkel, Heinrich, and Roger Manvell. Dr. Goebbels: His Life and Death. New York: Simon & Schuster, 1960.
- Fraenkel, Heinrich, and Roger Manvell. Heinrich Himmler. New York: Skyhorse Publishing, 2007.
- Fraser, David. Knight's Cross : A Life of Field Marshal Erwin Rommel. New York: Harper Perennial, 1994.
- Frick, Wilhelm, and Arthur Gütt. Nordisches Gedankengut im Dritten Reich: Drei Vorträge. Munich, 1936.
- Friedrich, Otto. Blood and Iron: From Bismarck to Hitler, the von Moltke Family's Impact on German History. New York: HarperCollins, 1995.
- Gerwarth, Robert. Hitler's Hangman: The Life of Heydrich. New Haven, CT: Yale University Press, 2011.
- Goebbels, Joseph. Final Entries 1945: The Diaries of Joseph Goebbels. New York: Putnam, 1978.
- Goebbels, Joseph. Kommunismus ohne Maske. Munich: Zentralverlag der NSDAP, 1935.
- Goebbels, Joseph. The Goebbels Diaries, 1939–1941. Fred Taylor, trans. New York: Putnam, 1983.
- Goebbels, Joseph. The Goebbels Diaries, 1942–1943. New York: Award Books, 1971.
- Goebbels, Joseph. Vom Kaiserhof zur Reichskanzlei. Eine historische Darstellung in Tagebuchblättern. München: Eher, 1934, 87.
- Göring, Hermann. Germany Reborn. London: E. Mathews & Marrot, 1934.
- Halder, Franz. The Halder War Diary, 1939–1942. Edited and translated by Charles Burdick and Hans Adolf Jacobsen. Novato, CA: Presidio, 1988.
- Hancock, Eleanor. The National Socialist Leadership and Total War, 1941–1945. New York: St. Martins Press, 1991.
- Heiber, Helmut. Goebbels. New York: Da Capo, 1983.
- Heydrich, Lina. Leben mit einem Kriegsverbrecher. Pfaffenhofen: W. Ludwig, 1976.
- Höhne, Heinz. Canaris: Hitler’s Master Spy. New York: Doubleday, 1979.
- Kater, Michael. The Nazi Party: A Social Profile of Members and Leaders, 1919–1945. Cambridge, MA: Harvard Press, 1983.
- Knopp, Guido. Hitler's Henchmen. 1998. Sutton Publishing, 2005. ISBN 0-7509-3781-5.
- Lang, Jochen von, and Claus Sibyll. The Secretary, Martin Bormann: The Man Who Manipulated Hitler. New York: Random House, 1979.
- Leaser, James. Rudolf Hess: The Uninvited Envoy. London: Allen & Unwin, 1962.
- Lemay, Benoit. Erich von Manstein: Hitler’s Master Strategist. Philadelphia and Oxford: Casemate, 2013.
- Lerner, Daniel. The Nazi Elite. Stanford, CA: Stanford University Press, 1951.
- Ley, Robert. Reichsorganisationsleiter der NSDAP, Das Organisationsbuch der NSDAP. Munich: Franz Eher Verlag, 1937 and 1943.
- Lochner, Louis P., ed. The Goebbels Diaries, 1942–43. New York: Doubleday, 1948.
- Longerich, Peter. Goebbels: A Biography. New York: Random House, 2015.
- Longerich, Peter. Heinrich Himmler: A Life. Oxford: Oxford University Press, 2012.
- MacGovern, J. Martin Bormann. New York: Morrow, 1968.
- Manvell, Roger, and Heinrich Fraenkel. Hess: A Biography. London: MacGibbons and Kee, 1971.
- Manvell, Roger, and Heinrich Fraenkel. Heinrich Himmler: The Sinister Life of the Head of the SS and Gestapo. New York: Skyhorse Publishing, 2007.
- Manvell, Roger and Heinrich Fraenkel. Doctor Goebbels. New York: Skyhorse Publishing, 2010.
- Manvell, Roger, and Heinrich Fraenkel. Goering: The Rise and Fall of the Notorious Nazi Leader. New York: Skyhorse Publishing, 2011.
- Meissner, Hans-Otto. Magda Goebbels: The First Lady of the Third Reich. Translated by G. M. Keeble. New York: Dial Press, 1980.
- Melvin, Mungo. Manstein: Hitler's Greatest General. New York: St. Martin's Press, 2010.
- Messenger, Charles. Hitler's Gladiator: Oberstgruppenfuehrer und Panzergeneral-Oberst der Waffen-SS, Sepp Dietrich. London: Brassey's Defence Publishers, 1988.
- Miller, Michael; Schulz, Andrea. Gauleiter. The Regional Leaders of The Nazi Party and their Deputies, 1925–1945 (Herbert Albrecht-H. Wilhelm Huttmann) – Vol. 1. San Jose, CA: R. James Bender Publishing, 2012.
- Moltke, Helmuth James von. Letters to Freya, 1939–1945. Translated by Beate Ruhm von Oppen. New York: Vintage, 1990.
- Mueller, Gene. The Forgotten Field Marshal: Wilhelm Keitel. Durham, NC: Moore Publishing Company, 1979.
- Overy, Richard J. Goering: The 'Iron Man'. London: Routledge Kegan Paul, 1984.
- Overy, Richard J. Interrogations: The Nazi Elite in Allied Hands, 1945. New York: Penguin Books, 2001.
- Padfield, Peter. Doenitz, the Last Fuehrer. A Portrait of a Nazi War Leader. New York: Harper & Row, 1984.
- Padfield, Peter. Himmler: Reichsführer-SS. New York: Henry Holt and Company, 1991.
- Pick, Daniel. The Pursuit of the Nazi Mind: Hitler, Hess, and the Analysts. New York: Oxford University Press, 2012.
- Posner, Gerald, and John Ware. Mengele: The Complete Story. New York: McGraw Hill, 1986.
- Pringle, Heather Ann. The Master Plan: Himmler's Scholars and the Holocaust. New York: Hyperion, 2006.
- Raeder, Erich. My Life. Trans. by Henry W. Drexel. New York: Arno Press, 1980.
- Read, Anthony. The Devil's Disciples: Hitler's Inner Circle. New York: W. W. Norton & Co., 2003.
- Reuth, Ralf Georg. Goebbels. New York: Harcourt, 1993.
- Rosenberg, Alfred. The Myth of the Twentieth Century: An Evaluation of the Spiritual-Intellectual Confrontations of Our Age. Wentzville, MO: Invictus Books, 2011.
- Schacht, Hjalmar. Account Settled. London: G. Weidenfeld & Nicolson, 1949.
- Schmidt, Matthias. Albert Speer: The End of a Myth. Trans. Joachim Neugroschel. New York: St. Martin's Press, 1984.
- Schmidt, Ulf. Karl Brandt: The Nazi Doctor, Medicine, and Power in the Third Reich. New York: Hambledon Continuum, 2007.
- Schwarz, Paul. This Man Ribbentrop. New York: Julian Messer, 1943.
- Seabury, Paul. The Wilhelmstrasse: A Study of German Diplomats under the Nazi Regime. Berkeley, CA: UC Press, 1954.
- Sereny, Gita. Albert Speer: His Battle with Truth. New York: Alfred Knopf, 1995.
- Smelser, Ronald M. Robert Ley: Hitler's Labor Front Leader. New York: Berg, 1988.
- Smelser, Ronald M. and Rainer Zitelmann, The Nazi Elite New York University Press, 1993.
- Smith, Bradley. Heinrich Himmler: A Nazi in the Making, 1900–1926. Stanford, CA: Stanford University Press, 1971.
- Stachura, Peter D. Gregor Strasser and the Rise of Nazism. Winchester, MA: Allen and Unwin, 1983.
- Vat, Jan van der. The Good Nazi: The Life and Lies of Albert Speer. New York: Houghton Mifflin, 1997.
- Weitz, John. Hitler’s Banker: Hjalmar Horace Greeley Schacht. Boston: Little, Brown, 1997.
- Weitz, John. Hitler's Diplomat: The Life and Times of Joachim von Ribbentrop. New York: Ticknor & Fields, 1992.
- Whiting, Charles. The Search for 'Gestapo' Müller: The Man Without a Shadow. Barnsley, South Yorkshire: Leo Cooper, 2001.
- Wildt, Michael. An Uncompromising Generation: The Nazi Leadership of the Reich Security Main Office. Madison, WI: The University of Wisconsin Press, 2009.
- Wistrich, Robert S. Who's Who In Nazi Germany. New York: Routledge, 2001.

== Local and regional ==
- Allen, William Sheridan. The Nazi Seizure of Power: The Experience of a Single German Town, 1922–1945 New York: F. Watts, 1984.
- Baker, Leonard. Days of Sorrow and Pain: Leo Baeck and the Berlin Jews. New York: Macmillan, 1978.
- Baranowski, Shelley. The Sanctity of Rural Life: Nobility, Protestantism, and Nazism in Weimar Prussia. New York: Oxford University Press, 1995.
- Bergerson, Andrew Stuart. Ordinary Germans in Extraordinary Times: The Nazi Revolution in Hildesheim. Bloomington & Indianapolis: Indiana University Press, 2004.
- Berkhoff, Karel C. Harvest of Despair: Life and Death in Ukraine under Nazi Rule. Cambridge: Cambridge University Press, 2004.
- Bessel Richard. "Policing, Professionalism and Politics in Weimar Germany". In Policing Western Europe, edited by Clive Emsley and Barbara Weinberger. New York: Greenwood Press, 1991.
- Bessel, Richard J. Political Violence and the Rise of Nazism. The Storm Troopers in Eastern Germany, 1925–1934. New Haven, CT: Yale University Press, 1984.
- Blumenstock, Friedrich. Der Einmarsch der Amerikaner und Franzosen im Nördlichen Württemberg im April 1945. Stuttgart: W. Kohlhammer Verlag, 1957.
- Botwinick, Rita S. Winzig, Germany, 1933–1946. The History of a Town under the Third Reich. Westport, CT: Praeger, 1992.
- Brandt, W. "Foreword", in F.Henry, Victims and Neighbours. A Small Town in Nazi Germany Remembered. Boston: Bergin and Garvey, 1984.
- Broszat, Martin, and Elke Fröhlich, eds. Bayern in der NS-Zeit. Vol. 2, Herrschaft und Gesellschaft in Konflikt: Teil A. Munich: R. Oldenbourg Verlag, 1979.
- Bukey, Evan Burr. Hitler's Hometown: Linz, Austria, 1908–1945. Bloomington, IN: Indiana University Press, 1986.
- Duff, Shiela. A German Protectorate: The Czechs under Nazi Rule. London: Frank Cass, 1970.
- Estermann, Alfred. Bad Windsheim: Geschichte und Gegenwart einer fränkischen Stadt. Bad Windsheim: Verlagsdruckerei Heinrich Delp, 1989.
- Fritzsch, Robert. Nürnberg im Krieg: Im Dritten Reich 1939–1945. Düsseldorf: Droste Verlag, 1984.
- Fussel, Paul. The Boys’ Crusade. New York: Modern Library, 2003.
- Gimbel, John. A German Community under American Occupation: Marburg, 1945– 1952. Stanford: Stanford Univ. Press, 1961.
- Grill, Johnpeter Horst. The Nazi Movement in Baden, 1920–1945. Chapel Hill, NC: North Carolina University Press, 1983.
- Hackett, David., ed. The Buchenwald Report. Boulder, San Francisco and Oxford: Westview Press, 1995.
- Hamann, Brigitte. Winifred Wagner: A Life at the Heart of Hitler's Bayreuth. London: Granta, 2005.
- Hartmann, G., ed. Bitburg in Moral and Political Perspective. Bloomington: Indiana University Press, 1986.
- Hayward, N.F and D.J. Morris. Coburg: The First Nazi Town. New York: St.Martins Press, 1988.
- Heberle, Rudolf. From Democracy to Nazism. A Regional Case Study on Political Parties. Baton Rouge, LA: LSU Press, 1945.
- Heilbronner, Oded. Catholicism, Political Culture, and the Countryside: A Social History of the Nazi Party in South Germany. Ann Arbor: University of Michigan Press, 1997.
- Henry, Frances. Victims and Neighbors. A Small Town in Nazi Germany Remembered. South Hadley, MA: Bergen and Garvey, 1984.
- Historische Archiv der Stadt Köln. Widerstand und Verfolgung in Köln, 1933–1945. Köln, 1974.
- Kauders, Anthony. German Politics and the Jews: Düsseldorf and Nuremberg, 1910–1933. Oxford: Clarendon Press, 1996.
- Kohler Eric D. "The Crisis of the Prussian Schutzpolizei, 1920–1931". In Police Forces in History, edited by George L. Mosse, 131-150. London: SAGE Publications, 1975.
- Koshar, Rudy. Social Life, Local Politics, and Nazism. Marburg 1880–1935. Chapel Hill, NC: UNC Press, 1986.
- Landesjugendring Hamburg, ed. Nazi-Terror und Widerstand in Hamburg: Alternative Stadtrundfahrt. Fifth edition. Hamburg: Landesjugendring Hamburg, e.V., 1989.
- Large, David Clay. Where Ghosts Walked: Munich's Road to the Third Reich. New York: W. W. Norton, 1997.
- Levine, H. S. Hitler's Free City: A History of the Nazi Party in Danzig, 1925–1939. Chicago: University of Chicago Press, 1973.
- Liang Hsi-Huey. The Berlin Police Force in the Weimar Republic. Berkeley, CA: University of California, 1970.
- Marssolek Inge, and Rene Ott. Bremen im Dritten Reich: Anpassung, Widerstand, Verfolgung. Bremen: Schünemann Verlag, 1986.
- Mazower, Mark. Inside Hitler’s Greece: The Experience of Occupation, 1941–44. New Haven: Yale University Press 1993.
- Newton, Ronald C. The "Nazi Menace" in Argentina, 1931–1947. Stanford: Stanford University Press, 1992.
- Noakes, Jeremy. The Nazi Party in Lower Saxony, 1921–1933. London 7 New York: Oxford University Press, 1971.
- Pridham, Geoffrey. NSDAP's Rise to Power: The Nazi Movement in Bavaria, 1923–1933. London: Hart, Davis, & MacGibbon, 1973.
- Prussia - Ministerium des Innern. "Landeskriminalpolizei." Vorschriften für die staatliche Polizei Preussens. Berlin: Kameradschaft Verlagsgesellschaft, 1927.
- Rosenfeld, Gavriel D. Munich and Memory: Architecture, Monuments, and the Legacy of the Third Reich. Berkeley: University of California Press, 2000.
- Schröder, Michael. Bayern 1945: Demokratischer Neubeginn. Interviews mit Augenzeugen. Munich: Süddeutscher Verlag, 1985.
- Schwarz, Klaus-Dieter. Weltkrieg und Revolution in Nürnberg. Stuttgart: Klett, 1971
- Siebel-Achenbach, Sebastian. Lower Silesia from Nazi Germany to Communist Poland. New York: St. Martins Press, 1992.
- Stokes, Lawrence D. Kleinstadt und Nationalsozialismus. Ausgewaehlte Dokumente zur Geschichte von Eutin, 1918–1945. Neumuenster: Karl Wachholtz Verlag, 1984.
- Szejnmann, Claus-Christian. Nazism in Central Germany: The Brownshirts in "Red" Saxony. New York: Berghan, 1999.
- Winstone, Martin. The Dark Heart of Hitler's Europe: Nazi Rule in Poland under the General Government. New York: I. B. Tauris, 2014.

== Military and foreign policy ==
- Addington, Larry. The Blitzkrieg Era and the German General Staff. New Brunswick, NJ: Rutgers University Press, 1971.
- Aitken, Leslie. Massacre on the Road to Dunkirk: Wormhoudt 1940. London: Kimber Publishing, 1977
- Alexander, Bevin. Inside the Nazi War Machine: How Three Generals Unleashed Hitler's Blitzkrieg upon the World. New York: NAL Caliber, 2011.
- Atkinson, Rick. An Army at Dawn: The War in North Africa, 1942–1943. New York: Henry Holt & Company, 2002.
- Atkinson, Rick. The Day of Battle: The War in Sicily and Italy, 1943–1944. New York: Henry Holt & Company, 2007.
- Atkinson, Rick. The Guns at Last Light: The War in Western Europe, 1944–1945. New York: Picador, 2014.
- Baird, Jay. To Die for Germany: Heroes in the Nazi Pantheon. Bloomington: Indiana University Press, 1990.
- Baranowski, Shelley. Nazi Empire: German Colonialism and Imperialism from Bismarck to Hitler. New York: Cambridge University Press, 2010.
- Barnett, Correlli, ed. Hitler's Generals. New York: Grove Press, 2003.
- Bartov, Omer. Hitler's Army: Soldiers, Nazis, and War in the Third Reich. New York: Oxford University Press. 1992.
- Bartov, Omer. The Eastern Front, 1941–45: German Troops and the Barbarization of Warfare. New York: Palgrave Macmillan, 1985.
- Baumbach, Werner. The Life and Death of the Luftwaffe. New York: Coward-McCann, 1960.
- Beck, Earl R. Under the Bombs: The German Home Front, 1942–1945. Lexington: The University Press of Kentucky, 1986.
- Beevor, Antony. Stalingrad: The Fateful Siege: 1942–1943. New York & London: Viking, 1998.
- Beevor, Antony. Berlin: The Downfall 1945. Viking-Penguin Books, 2002.
- Beevor, Antony. D-Day, The Battle for Normandy. Viking-Penguin Books, 2009.
- Beevor, Antony. Ardennes 1944: Hitler’s Last Gamble. New York: Viking, 2015.
- Beevor, Antony. The Battle of Arnhem: The Deadliest Airborne Operation of World War II. New York: Viking, 2018.
- Bergstrom, Christer. Bagration to Berlin: The Final Air Battles in the East: 1944–1945. Weybridge: Ian Allan, 2007.
- Bessel, Richard. Nazism and War. New York: Modern Library, 2006.
- Bethell, Nicholas. The War Hitler Won: The Fall of Poland, September 1939. New York: Holt, Rinehart & Winston, 1972.
- Biddiscombe, Perry. Werwolf!: The History of the National Socialist Guerrilla Movement, 1944–1946. Toronto: University of Toronto Press, 1998.
- Bird, Keith W. Weimar: The German Naval Officer Corps and the Rise of National Socialism. Amsterdam: B. R. Gruener, 1977.
- Blair, Clay. Hitler’s U-Boat War: The Hunters, 1939–1942. New York: Random House, 1996.
- Blair, Clay. Hitler’s U-Boat War: The Hunted, 1942–1945. New York: Random House, 1998.
- Blandford, Edmund. Under Hilter’s Banner: Serving the Third Reich. Edison, NJ: Castle Books, 2001.
- Blood, Philip W. Hitler's Bandit Hunters: The SS and the Nazi Occupation of Europe. Dulles, VA: Potomac Books Inc., 2008.
- Böhler, Jochen, and Robert Gerwarth. The Waffen-SS: A European History. Oxford and New York: Oxford University Press, 2017
- Bottger, Armin. To the Gate of Hell: A Memoir of a Panzer Crewman. Barnsley: Frontline Books, 2012.
- Brett-Smith, Richard. Hitler's Generals. San Francisco, CA: Presidio Press, 1977.
- Browning, Christopher. The Final Solution and the German Foreign Office. New York: Holmes & Meier, 1978.
- Brownlow, Donald G. Panzer Baron: The Military Exploits of General Hasso von Manteuffel. North Quincy, MA: The Christopher Publishing House, 1975.
- Bruhl, Marshall de. Firestorm: Allied Air-power and the Destruction of Dresden. New York: Random House, 2006.
- Buttar, Prit. Battleground Prussia: The Assault on Germany's Eastern Front, 1944–45. Oxford: Osprey, 2010.
- Buttar, Prit. Between Giants: The Battle for the Baltics in World War II. New York: Osprey Publishing, 2013.
- Byrd, R. W. Once I Had a Comrade: Karl Roth and the Combat History of 36th Panzer Regiment 1939–1945. Solihull: Helion, 2006.
- Caddick-Adams, Peter. Snow and Steel: The Battle of the Bulge, 1944–45 . Oxford and New York: Oxford University Press, 2014.
- Campbell, Bruce. The SA Generals and the Rise of Nazism. Lexington, KY: University Press of Kentucky, 1998.
- Carr, William. Arms, Autarky, and Aggression: A Study in German Foreign Policy, 1933–1939. London: Edward Arnold, 1979.
- Carius, Otto, and Robert J. Edwards. Tigers in the Mud. Mechanicsburg: Stackpole, 2003.
- Carsten, Francis L. The Reichswehr and Politics, 1918–1933. Oxford: Clarendon, 1966.
- Chant, Christopher and Richard Humble. Hitler's Generals and Their Battles. New York: Chartwell Books, 1976.
- Chickering, Roger, Stig Förster, and Bernd Greiner, eds. A World at Total War: Global Conflict and the Politics of Destruction, 1937–1945. New York: Cambridge University Press, 2005.
- Chuikov, V. I. The Battle for Stalingrad. New York: Holt, Rinehart & Winston, 1964.
- Citino, Robert M. Death of the Wehrmacht: The German Campaigns of 1942. Lawrence: University Press of Kansas, 2007.
- Citino, Robert M. Quest for Decisive Victory: From Stalemate to Blitzkrieg in Europe, 1899–1940. Lawrence, KS: University Press of Kansas, 2002.
- Citino, Robert M. The German Way of War: From the Thirty Years' War to the Third Reich. Lawrence, KS: University Press of Kansas, 2008.
- Citino, Robert M. The Wehrmacht Retreats: Fighting a Lost War, 1943. Lawrence, KS: University Press of Kansas, 2012.
- Cohen, Roger. Soldiers and Slaves: American POWs Trapped by the Nazis' Final Gamble. New York: Alred A. Knopf, 2005.
- Cooke, Ronald, and Roy Nesbit. Target, Hitler's Oil: Allied Attacks on German Oil Supplies, 1939–1945. London: Kimber, 1985.
- Cooper, Matthew. The German Army, 1933–1945: Its Political and Military Failure. New York: Stein and Day, 1978.
- Cooper, Matthew. The German Air Force, 1933–1945: An Anatomy of Failure. New York: Jane's Publishing Incorporated, 1981.
- Corum, James S. The Luftwaffe: Creating an Operation War, 1918–1940. Lawrence: University of Kansas Press, 1997.
- Craig, Gordon A. The Politics of the Prussian Army, 1640–1945. New York: Oxford University Press, 1955.
- Craig, William. Enemy at the Gates: The Battle of Stalingrad. New York: E.R. Dutton, 1973.
- Cremer, Peter. U-Boat Commander. Annapolis, MD: Naval Institute Press, 1984.
- Dallin, Alexander. German Rule in Russia, 1941–1945: A Study of Occupation Policies. London: Macmillan, 1957.
- Dastrup, Boyd L. Crusade in Nuremberg: Military Occupation, 1945–1949. Westport, Conn.: Greenwood Press, 1985.
- Davies, Norman. Rising '44: The Battle for Warsaw. New York: Viking, 2004.
- Davis, Franklin, Jr. Came as a Conqueror: The United States Army's Occupation of Germany, 1945–1949. New York: Macmillan, 1967.
- Degrelle, Léon. Campaign in Russia: The Waffen-SS on the Eastern Front. Bristol: Crecy Books, 1985.
- Deighton, Len. Blitzkrieg: From the Rise of Hitler to the Fall of Dunkirk. London: Jonathan Cape, 1979.
- Deist, Wilhelm. The German Military in the Age of Total War. Leamington Spa, England: Berg, 1985.
- Deist, Wilhelm. The Wehrmacht and German Rearmament. Toronto: University of Toronto Press, 1981.
- DiNardo, R. L. Germany and the Axis Powers from Coalition to Collapse. Lawrence: University Press of Kansas, 2005.
- DiNardo, R. L. Mechanized Juggernaut or Military Anachronism? Horses and the German Army of WWII. Mechanicsburg, PA: Stackpole Books, 1998.
- Dollinger, Hans. The Decline and Fall of Nazi Germany and Imperial Japan. Gramercy, 1995, [1965].
- Dunn, Walter S. Soviet Blitzkrieg: The Battle for White Russia, 1944. London: Lynne Rienner, 2000.
- Echternkamp, Jörg, and Ralf Blank, eds. Die deutsche Kriegsgesellschaft, 1939 bis 1945: Ausbeutung, Deutungen, Ausgrenzung. Vol. 9/2 of Das deutsche Reich und der Zweite Weltkrieg. Munich: Deutsche Verlags-Anstalt, 2005.
- Ehlers Jr., Robert S. Targeting the Third Reich: Air Intelligence and the Allied Bombing Campaigns. Lawrence, KS: University Press of Kansas, 2009.
- Einsiedel, Heinrich Graf von. The Onslaught: The German Drive to Stalingrad. New York: Norton, 1985.
- Erickson, John. The Road to Berlin. London: Weidenfeld & Nicolson, 1983.
- Erickson, John. The Road to Stalingrad. London: Weidenfeld & Nicolson, 1975.
- Forbes, Robert. For Europe: The French Volunteers of the Waffen-SS. Stackpole Books, 2010, [2006].
- Förster, Jürgen. "The German Army and the Ideological War against the Soviet Union." In Gerhard Hirschfeld, ed., The Policies of Genocide: Jews and Soviet Prisoners of War in Nazi Germany, pp. 15–29. London: Allen & Unwin, 1986.
- Forster, Tony. Meeting of Generals. Agincourt, Canada: Methuen Publications, 1986.
- Friedrich, Jörg. The Fire: The Bombing of Germany, 1940–1945. Translated by Allison Brown. New York: Columbia University Press, 2006.
- Frieser, Karl-Heinz. The Blitzkrieg Legend: The 1940 Campaign in the West. Translated by John T. Greenwood. Annapolis, MD: Naval Institute Press, 2005.
- Fritz, Stephen G. Endkampf: Soldiers, Civilians, and the Death of the Third Reich. Lexington: University Press of Kentucky, 2004.
- Fritz, Stephen G. Ostkrieg: Hitler's War of Extermination in the East. Lexington, KY: University Press of Kentucky, 2011.
- Fritz, Stephen G. Frontsoldaten : The German Soldier in World War II. Lexington, KY: University Press of Kentucky, 2010.
- Fugate, Bryan I. Operation Barbarossa: Strategy and Tactics on the Eastern Front. Novato, CA: Presidio, 1984.
- Garrett, Stephen A. Ethics and Airpower in World War II: The British Bombing of German Cities. New York: St. Martin’s Press, 1993.
- Gerlach, Christian. Krieg, Ernährung, Völkermord. Hamburg: Hamburger, 1998.
- Germany and the Second World War (vol. 1): The Build-up of German Aggression. New York: Oxford University Press, 1990. Contributing authors: Wilhelm Deist, Manfred Messerschmidt, Hans-Erich Volkmann, and Wolfram Wette.
- Germany and the Second World War (vol. 2): Germany's Initial Conquests in Europe. New York: Oxford University Press, 1991. Contributing authors: Klaus A. Maier, Horst Rohde, Bernd Stegemann, and Hans Umbreit.
- Germany and the Second World War (vol. 3): The Mediterranean, South-East Europe, and North Africa, 1939–1942. New York: Oxford University Press, 1995. Contributing authors: Gerhard Schreiber, Bernd Stegemann, and Detlef Vogel.
- Germany and the Second World War (vol. 4): The Attack on the Soviet Union. New York: Oxford University Press, 1998. Contributing authors: Horst Boog, Jürgen Förster, Joachim Hoffmann, Ernst Klink, Rolf-Dieter Müller, and Gerd R. Ueberschär.
- Germany and the Second World War (vol. 5 – part 1): Organization and Mobilization of the German Sphere of Power: Wartime Administration, Economy, and Manpower Resources, 1939–1941. New York: Oxford University Press, 2000. Contributing authors: Bernhard R. Kroener, Rolf-Dieter Müller, and Hans Umbreit.
- Germany and the Second World War (vol. 5 – part 2): Organization and Mobilization of the German Sphere of Power: Wartime Administration, Economy, and Manpower Resources, 1942–1944/5. New York: Oxford University Press, 2003. Contributing authors: Bernhard R. Kroener, Rolf-Dieter Müller, and Hans Umbreit.
- Germany and the Second World War (vol. 6): The Global War. New York: Oxford University Press, 2001. Contributing authors: Horst Boog, Werner Rahn, Reinhard Stumpf, and Bernd Wegner.
- Germany and the Second World War (vol. 7): The Strategic Air War in Europe and the War in the West and East Asia 1943–1944/5. New York: Oxford University Press, 2006. Contributing authors: Horst Boog, Gerhard Krebs, and Detlef Vogel.
- Germany and the Second World War (vol. 8): Die Ostfront 1943/44. Der Krieg im Osten und an den Nebenfronten. [work remains untranslated] München: Deutsche Verlags-Anstalt, 2007. Contributing authors: Karl-Heinz Frieser, Klaus Schmider, Klaus Schönherr, Gerhard Schreiber, Krisztián Ungváry, and Bernd Wegner.
- Germany and the Second World War (vol. 9 – part 1): German Wartime Society 1939–1945: Politicization, Disintegration, and the Struggle for Survival. New York: Oxford University Press, 2008. Contributing authors: Ralf Blank, Jörg Echternkamp, Karola Fings, Jürgen Förster, Winfried Heinemann, Tobias Jersak, Armin Nolzen, and Christoph Rass.
- Germany and the Second World War (vol. 9 – part 2): German Wartime Society 1939–1945: Exploitation, Interpretations, Exclusion. New York: Oxford University Press, 2014. Contributing authors: Bernhard Chiari, Jörg Echternkamp, et al.
- Glantz, David M. Soviet Military Deception in the Second World War. London: Frank Cass, 1989.
- Glantz, David M. From the Don to the Dnepr: Soviet Offensive Operations, December 1942–August 1943. London: Frank Cass, 1991.
- Glantz, David M. The Military Strategy of the Soviet Union: A History. London: Frank Cass, 1992.
- Glantz, David M., ed. The Initial Period of War on the Eastern Front, 22 June–August 1941. London: Frank Cass, 1993.
- Glantz, David M. When Titans Clashed: How the Red Army Stopped Hitler. Lawrence: University Press of Kansas, 2016 [1995].
- Glantz, David M., and Jonathan M. House. The Battle of Kursk. Lawrence, KS: University Press of Kansas, 1999.
- Glantz, David M. Forgotten Battles of the German-Soviet War (1941–1945), volume I: The Summer-Fall Campaign (22 June–4 December 1941). Carlisle, PA: Self-published, 1999.
- Glantz, David M. Forgotten Battles of the German-Soviet War (1941–1945), volume II: The Winter Campaign (5 December 1941–April 1942). Carlisle, PA: Self-published, 1999.
- Glantz, David M. Forgotten Battles of the German-Soviet War (1941–1945), volume III: The Summer Campaign (12 May–18 November 1942). Carlisle, PA: Self-published, 1999.
- Glantz, David M. Forgotten Battles of the German-Soviet War (1941–1945), volume IV: The Winter Campaign (19 November 1942–21 March 1943). Carlisle, PA: Self-published, 1999.
- Glantz, David M. Forgotten Battles of the German-Soviet War (1941–1945), volume V, parts 1 and 2: The Summer-Fall Campaign (1 July-31 December 1943). Carlisle, PA: Self-published, 2000.
- Glantz, David M. Barbarossa: Hitler’s Invasion of Russia in 1941. Charleston, SC: Tempus, 2001.
- Glantz, David M., and Harold S. Orenstein, eds. Belorussia 1944: The Soviet General Staff Study. Translated by David M. Glantz and Harold S. Orenstein. London: Frank Cass, 2001.
- Glantz, David M. The Siege of Leningrad 1941–1945: 900 Days of Terror. London: Brown Partworks, 2001.
- Glantz, David M. The Battle for Leningrad, 1941–1944. Lawrence, KS: University Press of Kansas, 2002.
- Glantz, David M. To the Gates of Stalingrad: Soviet-German Combat Operations, April–August 1942. Lawrence, KS: University Press of Kansas, 2009.
- Goebeler, Hans and John Vanzo. Steel Boat Iron Hearts: A U-boat Crewman's Life Aboard U-505. New York: Savas Beatie, 2008.
- Goerlitz, Walter. History of the German General Staff, 1657–1945. New York: Praeger, 1953.
- Goerlitz, Walter. Paulus and Stalingrad. Westport, CT: Greenwood Press, 1974.
- Gole, Henry G. Exposing the Third Reich. Colonel Truman Smith in Hitler's Germany. Lexington, KY: The University Press of Kentucky, 2013.
- Gorodetsky, Gabriel. Grand Delusion: Stalin and the German Invasion of Russia. New Haven, CT: Yale University Press, 1999.
- Grier, Howard D. Hitler, Dönitz, and the Baltic Sea: The Third Reich's Last Hope, 1944–1945. Annapolis, MD: Naval Institute Press, 2007.
- Gross, J. T. Polish Society under German Occupation: The Generalgouverment, 1939–1944. Princeton, NJ: Princeton University Press, 1979.
- Halder, Franz. The Halder War Diary, 1939–1942. Charkes Burdick and Hans-Adolf Jacobson, eds. Novato, CA: Presidio Press, 1988.
- Hamburg Institute for Social Research, (ed). The German Army and Genocide: Crimes against War Prisoners, Jews, and Other Civilians, 1939–1944. New York: New Press, 1999.
- Hamilton, A. Stephan. Bloody Streets: The Soviet Assault on Berlin, April 1945. Helion & Co., 2008.
- Hancock, Eleanor. National Socialist Leadership and Total War, 1941–1945. New York: St.Martins Press, 1991.
- Handbook on German Military Forces. 1945. Reprint with an introduction by Stephen E. Ambrose. Baton Rouge: Louisiana State University Press, 1990.
- Hansen, Randall. Fire and Fury: The Allied Bombing of Germany, 1942–1945. New York: New American Library, 2008.
- Hartmann, Christian. Wehrmacht im Ostkrieg: Front und militärisches Hinterland, 1941–42. Munich: Oldenbourg, 2009.
- Hartmann, Christian. Operation Barbarossa: Germany’s War in the East, 1941–1945. Oxford and New York: Oxford University Press, 2013.
- Hastings, Max. Armageddon: The Battle for Germany, 1944–45. New York: Vintage, 2005.
- Hastings, Max. Inferno: The World at War, 1939–1945. New York: Vintage, 2011.
- Healy, Mark. Zitadelle: The German Offensive Against the Kursk Salient 4–17 July 1943. The History Press, 2008.
- Heer, H. Tote Zonen. Die Deutsche Wehrmacht an der Ostfront. Hamburg: Hamburger Edition, 1999.
- Heer, Hannes and Naumann, Klaus, eds. War of Extermination: The German Military in World War II, 1941–1944. New York: Berghahn Books, 2000.
- Hehn, Paul N. The German Struggle in World War II: German Counter-Insurgency in Yugoslavia, 1941–1943. Boulder, CO: East European Quarterly, 1979.
- Heiber, Helmut, and David M. Glantz. Hitler and His Generals: Military Conferences, 1942–1945: The First Complete Stenographic Record of the Military Situation Conferences, from Stalingrad to Berlin. New York: Enigma, 2003.
- Hellbeck, Jochen. Stalingrad: The City that Defeated the Third Reich. New York: Public-Affairs, 2015.
- Herzstein, Robert Edwin. The War that Hitler Won. The Most Infamous Propaganda Campaign in History. New York: G.P. Putnam’s Sons, 1978.
- Higgins, Trumbull. Hitler and Russia: The Third Reich in a Two-Front War, 1937–1943. New York: Macmillan, 1966.
- Hildebrand, Klaus. The Foreign Policy of the Third Reich. Berkeley CA: UC Press, 1973.
- Hillblad, Thorolf, and Erik Wallin. Twilight of the Gods: A Swedish Waffen-SS Volunteer's Experiences with the 11th SS-Panzergrenadier Division Nordland, Eastern Front 1944–45. West Midlands: Helion and Company, 2004.
- Hillgruber, Andreas Germany and the Two World Wars, Cambridge, MA: Harvard University Press, 1981.
- Homze, Edward. Arming the Luftwaffe. Lincoln, Nebraska: University of Nebraska, 1976.
- Hooton, E.R. Phoenix Triumphant: The Rise and Rise of the Luftwaffe. London: Brockhampton Press, 1994.
- Hooton, E.R. The Luftwaffe: A Study in Air Power, 1933–1945. London: Classic Publications, 2010.
- Hooton, E.R. Luftwaffe at War: Gathering Storm 1933–39: Volume 1. London: Chevron/Ian Allan, 2007.
- Hooton, E.R. Luftwaffe at War: Blitzkrieg in the West: Volume 2 . London: Chevron/Ian Allan, 2007.
- Hooton, E.R. Eagle in Flames: The Fall of the Luftwaffe. London: Weidenfeld Military, 1997.
- Horne, Alistair. To Lose a Battle: France, 1940. Harmondsworth: Penguin, 1969.
- Hoyt, Edwin. The U-Boat Wars. New York: Arbor House, 1984.
- Hunt, Robert, and Tom Hartman. Swastika at War. Garden City, NY: Doubleday, 1975.
- Hürter, Johanne. A German General on the Eastern Front: The Letters and Diaries of Gotthard Heinrici, 1941–1942. South Yorkshire: Pen and Sword, 2015.
- Jackson, Julian. The Fall of France: The Nazi Invasion of 1940. New York: Oxford University Press, 2003.
- Jacobsen, Hans-Adolf, "The Structure of Nazi Foreign Policy 1933–1945", in Christian Leitz (ed.), The Third Reich: The Essential Readings. Oxford: Blackwell, 1999.
- Jarausch, Konrad, ed. Reluctant Accomplice: A Wehrmacht Soldier's Letters from the Eastern Front. Princeton, NJ: Princeton University Press, 2011.
- Jones, Michael. Leningrad: State of Siege. London: John Murray, 2008.
- Jones, Michael. Total War: From Stalingrad to Berlin. London: John Murray, 2011.
- Jukes, Geoffrey. Hitler's Stalingrad Decisions. Berkeley and Los Angeles: University of California Press, 1985.
- Jünger, Ernst. Storm of Steel. London: Penguin, 2003.
- Junker, Detlef. Kampf um die Weltmacht: Die USA und das Dritte Reich, 1933–1945. Düsseldorf: Schwann-Bagel, 1988.
- Kahn, David. Hitler's Spies: German Military Intelligence in World War II. New York, Macmillan, 1985.
- Karlsch, Rainer. Hitlers Bombe. Munich: Deutsche Verlags-Anstalt, 2005.
- Kershaw, Ian. The End: The Defiance and Destruction of Hitler's Germany, 1944–1945. New York: Penguin Books, 2011.
- Kershaw, Robert J. War without Garlands: Operation Barbarossa, 1941/42. Rockville Centre, NY: Sarpedon, 2000.
- Kessler, Leo. Kommando. London: Leo Cooper, 1995.
- Killen, John. The Luftwaffe: A History. South Yorkshire: Pen & Sword Military, 2003.
- Kirchubel, Robert, and Dmitriy Zgonnik. Luftwaffe Field and Flak Divisions. Hong Kong: Concord Publications, 2007.
- Kissel, Hans. Der deutsche Volkssturm, 1944–1945: Eine territoriale Miliz im Rahmen der Landesverteidung. Frankfurt: Mittler, 1962.
- Kitchen, Martin. Nazi Germany at War. London & New York: Routledge, 1994.
- Knappe, Siegfried, and Ted Brusaw. Soldat: Reflections of a German Soldier 1936–49. New York: Orion Books, 1992.
- Kriegstagebuch des Oberkommando des Wehrmacht (Wehrmachtfuehrungsstab). Frankfurt am Main: Bernard & Graf Verlag fuer Wehrwesen, 1961. 4 volumes.
- Krammer, Arnold. Nazi Prisoners of War in America. Lanham, MD: Scarborough House, 1996.
- Krausnick, Helmut. Hitlers Einsatzgruppen: Die Truppe des Weltanschauungskrieges, 1938–1942. Frankfurt: Fischer Taschenbuch, 1985.
- Kriegl, Hermann. Sinnlos in den Krieg gejagt: Das Schicksal von Reserve-OffiziersBewerbern 1945. Zeitzeugen und Dokumente. Diessen: Grafische Kunstanstalt und Verlag Jos. C. Huber, 1995.
- Leach, Barry A. German Strategy against Russia. Oxford: Clarendon, 1973.
- Leitz, Christian. Nazi Foreign Policy, 1933–1941: The Road to Global War. London: Routledge, 2004.
- Leleu, Jean-Luc. La Waffen-SS: Soldats politiques en guerre. Paris: Perrin, 2007.
- Littlejohn, David. Foreign Legions of the Third Reich, Vol. 1, 2, 3, 4. San Jose, CA: R. James Bender, 1985.
- Lukes, Igor. Czechoslovakia between Stalin and Hitler: The Diplomacy of Edvard Beneš in the 1930s. Oxford: Oxford University Press, 1996.
- MacDonald, Charles B. The Battle of the Bulge. London: Weidenfeld & Nicolson, 1984.
- Mammach, Klaus. Der Volkssturm: Bestandteil des totalen Kriegseinsatz der deutschen Bevölkerung, 1944–1945. Berlin: Akademie Verlag, 1981.
- Maslov, Aleksander. Captured Soviet General: The Fate of Soviet Generals Captured by the Germans, 1941–1945. London: Frank Cass, 2001.
- Mawdsley, Evan. Thunder in the East: The Nazi-Soviet War, 1941–1945. London: Hodder Arnold, 2005.
- Mazower, Mark. Inside Hitler's Greece: The Experience of Occupation. New Haven & London: Yale University Press, 1993.
- McGeoch, Angus and Michael Veranov. The Mammoth Book of the Third Reich at War. New York: Carroll & Graf, 1997.
- Megargee, Geoffrey P. Inside Hitler’s High Command. Lawrence: University Press of Kansas, 2000.
- Megargee, Geoffrey P. War of Annihilation: Combat and Genocide on the Eastern Front, 1941. Lanham, MD: Rowman & Littlefield, 2006.
- Melvin, Mungo. Manstein: Hitler's Greatest General. New York: St. Martin's Press, 2010.
- Messenger, Charles. Hitler's Gladiator: The Life and Wars of Panzer Army Commander Sepp Dietrich. New York: Skyhorse, 2011.
- Messerschmidt, Manfred. Die Wehrmacht im NS-Staat. Zeit der Indoktrination. Hamburg: Decker Verlag, 1969.
- Messerschmidt, Manfred. “Die Wehrmacht: Vom Realitätsverlust zum Selbstbetrug.” In Ende des Dritten Reiches – Ende des Zweiten Weltkriegs: Eine perspektivische Rückschau, ed. Hans-Erich Volkmann, 223– 57. Munich: Piper, 1995.
- Middlebrook, Martin. The Battle of Hamburg: Allied Bomber Forces against a German City in 1943. London: Allen Lane, 1980.
- Militärgeschichtliches Forschungsamt, ed. Das Deutsche Reich und der Zweite Weltkrieg. Stuttgart: Deutsche Verlags-Anstalt, 1979
- Mitcham, Samuel. Crumbling Empire: The German Defeat in the East, 1944. Westport, CT: Praeger, 2001.
- Mitcham, Samuel. Rommel's Last Battle: The Desert Fox and the Normandy Campaign. New York: Stein & Day, 1983.
- Mitcham, Samuel. The Rise of the Wehrmacht. Westport, CT: Praeger, 2008. 2 volumes.
- Mitcham, Samuel, and Theodore-Friedrich von Stauffenberg. The Battle of Sicily, 1943. New York: Crown Publishers, 1991.
- Mitcham, Samuel. The Panzer Legions. Mechanicsburg, PA: Stackpole Books, 2000.
- Moorhouse, Roger. Berlin at War. New York: Basic Books, 2012.
- Mosier, John. Cross of Iron: The Rise and Fall of the German War Machine, 1918–1945. New York: Henry Holt and Company, 2006.
- Mosse, George. Fallen Soldiers: Reshaping the Memory of the World Wars. New York: Oxford University Press, 1990.
- Motadel, David. Islam and Nazi Germany's War. Cambridge, MA: Belknap Press of Harvard University Press, 2014.
- Mueller, Gene and Samuel W. Mitcham. Hitler's Commanders: Officers of the Wehrmacht, the Luftwaffe, the Kriegsmarine, and the Waffen-SS. Lanham, MD: Rowman & Littlefield Publishers, 2012.
- Mueller, Klaus Juergen. The Army, Politics, and Society in Germany, 1933–1945. Studies in the Army's Relation to Nazism. New York: St. Martin's Press, 1987.
- Mueller, Klaus-Juergen. “The Brutalisation of Warfare, Nazi Crimes and the Wehrmacht.” In Barbarossa: The Axis and the Allies, ed. John Erickson and David Dilks, 229–37. Edinburgh: Edinburgh University Press, 1994.
- Müller, Rolf-Dieter, and Gerd R. Ueberschär, eds. Kriegsende 1945: Die Zerstörung des Deutschen Reiches. Frankfurt: Fischer Taschenbuch Verlag, 1994.
- Müller, Rolf-Dieter, and Hans-Erich Volkmann. Die Wehrmacht: Mythos und Realität. Munich: Oldenbourg, 1999.
- Müller, Rolf Dieter. Hitler’s War in the East, 1941–1945: A Critical Assessment, trans. Bruce Little. New York: Berghahn Books, 2009.
- Müller, Rolf-Dieter. Unknown Eastern Front: The Wehrmacht and Hitler's Foreign Soldiers. London: I.B. Tauris, 2012.
- Müller, Rolf-Dieter. Hitler's Wehrmacht, 1935–1945. Lexington: University Press of Kentucky, 2016.
- Munoz, Antonio. Forgotten Legions: Obscure Combat Formations of the Waffen-SS. Paladin Press, 1991.
- Naimark, Norman. The Russians in Germany: A History of the Soviet Zone of Occupation, 1945–1949. Cambridge: Harvard Univ. Press, 1995.
- Nekrich, Aleksandr M. Pariahs, Partners, Predators: German–Soviet Relations, 1922–1941. Edited by Gregory L. Freeze. New York: Columbia University Press, 1997.
- Neitzel, Sonke, and Harald Welzer. Soldaten: On Fighting, Killing, and Dying – The Secret WWII Transcripts of German POWs. New York: Alfred A. Knopf, 2012.
- Neufeld, Michael. The Rocket and the Reich: Peenemünde and the Coming of the Ballistic Missile Era. New York: Free Press, 1995.
- Noakes, Jeremy. Nazism 1919–1945, IV. The German Home Front in World War II. Exeter: Exeter University Press, 1998.
- Olick, Jeffry K. In the House of the Hangman: The Agonies of German Defeat, 1943–1945. Chicago: University Of Chicago Press, 2005.
- O'Neill, Richard J. The German Army and the Nazi Party, 1933–1939. New York: James H. Heinemann, 1966.
- Ostermann, Rainer, ed. Kriegsende in der Oberpfalz: Ein historisches Tagebuch. Regensburg: Buchverlage der Mittelbayerischen Zeitung, 1995.
- Overy, Richard. Russia's War: A History of the Soviet War Effort, 1941–1945. New York: Penguin, 1997.
- Overy, Richard. Why the Allies Won. New York: Norton, 1995.
- Overy, Richard. The Bombers and the Bombed: Allied Air War Over Europe 1940–1945. New York: Viking, 2014.
- Paine, Lauran. German Military Intelligence in World War II: The Abwehr. New York: Stein & Day Publishing, 1984.
- Pallud, Jean Paul. Battle of the Bulge: Then and Now. London: After the Battle Publications, 1984.
- Pallud, Jean Paul. Blitzkrieg in the West: Then and Now. London: After the Battle Publications, 1991.
- Padfield, Peter, War Beneath the Sea: Submarine Conflict, 1939–1945 London, John Murray, 1995
- Parker, Danny S. Hitler's Warrior: The Life and Wars of SS Colonel Jochen Peiper. Philadelphia: Da Capo Press, 2014.
- Perl, William R. The Four-Front War: From the Holocaust to the Promised Land. New York: Crown, 1979.
- Peterson, Edward N. The American Occupation of Germany: Retreat to Victory. Detroit: Wayne State University Press, 1977.
- Pleshakov, Constantine. Stalin's Folly: The Tragic First Ten Days of World War II on the Eastern Front. Boston: Houghton Mifflin, 2005.
- Pimlott, John. Wehrmacht: The Illustrated History of the German Army in WWII. London: Aurum Press, 2001.
- Pontolillo, James. Murderous Elite: The Waffen-SS and Its Complete Record of War Crimes. Stockholm: Leander and Ekholm, 2009.
- Porten, Edward P. von der, and Karl Dönitz. The German Navy in World War II. New York: T. Y. Crowell, 1969.
- Powers, Thomas. Heisenberg’s War: The Secret History of the German Bomb. New York: Alfred A. Knopf, 1993.
- Proctor, Raymond L. Hitler's Luftwaffe in the Spanish Civil War. Westport, CT: Greenwood Press, 1983.
- Prüller, Wilhelm. Diary of a German Soldier. Translated by H. C. Robbins Landon. New York: Coward-McCann, 1963.
- Raus, Erhard. Panzer Operations: The Eastern Front Memoir of General Raus, 1941–45. Cambridge: Da Capo Press, 2003.
- Read, Anthony. The Fall of Berlin. New York: W.W. Norton, 1993.
- Read, Anthony, and David Fisher. The Deadly Embrace: Hitler, Stalin, and the Nazi-Soviet Pact, 1939–1941. New York: Norton, 1988.
- Rebentisch, Dieter. Fuehrerstaat und Verwaltung im Zweiten Weltkrieg. Verfassungsentwicklung und Verwaltungspolitik, 1939–1945. Stuttgart: Steiner Verlag, 1989.
- Rees, Laurence. War of the Century: When Hitler Fought Stalin. New York: New Press, 1999.
- Reid, Anna. Leningrad: The Epic Siege of World War II, 1941–1944. New York: Walker & Company, 2012.
- Reinhardt, Klaus. Moscow – the Turning Point: The Failure of Hitler's Strategy in the Winter of 1941–42. Translated by Karl B. Keenan. Oxford: Berg, 1992.
- Reynolds, Michael. The Devil's Adjutant: Jochen Peiper, Panzer Leader. Staplehurst: Spellmount Ltd., 1997.
- Reynolds, Michael. Sons of the Reich: II SS Panzer Corps, Normandy, Arnhem, Ardennes, Eastern Front. Staplehurst: Spellmount Ltd., 2002.
- Rich, Norman. Hitler's War Aims: Ideology, the Nazi State, and the Course of Expansion (vol. 1) New York: W.W. Norton & Company, 1973.
- Rich, Norman. Hitler's War Aims: The Establishment of the New Order. (vol. 2) New York: W.W. Norton & Company, 1974.
- Robertson, E.M. Hitler’s Pre-War Policy and Military Plans, 1933–1939. New York: Citadel Press, 1967.
- Rose, Arno. Werwolf 1944–1945: Eine Dokumentation. Stuttgart: Motorbuch Verlag, 1980.
- Rose, Paul Lawrence. Heisenberg and the Nazi Atomic Bomb Project: A Study in German Culture. Berkeley: University of California Press, 1998.
- Rossino, Alexander B. Hitler Strikes Poland: Blitzkrieg, Ideology, and Atrocity. Lawrence, KS: Kansas University Press, 2003.
- Rudel, Hans-Ulrich. Stuka Pilot. London: Black House Publishing Ltd., 2013.
- Ruge, Friedrich. Rommel in Normandy. San Rafael, CA: Presidio Press, 1979.
- Seaton, Albert. The Battle for Moscow. Briarcliff Manor, NY: Stein and Day, 1980.
- Seaton, Albert. The German Army, 1933–1945. New York: St. Martin's Press, 1982.
- Seaton, Albert. The Russo-German War, 1941–1945. New York, Praeger, 1970.
- Scheibert, Horst. Panzergrenadier Division Grossdeutschland. Warren, MI: Signal Publications, 1977.
- Schmidt, Heinz Werner. With Rommel in the Desert. London: Panther Books, 1968.
- Schramm, Wilhelm von. Geheimdienst im Zweiten Weltkrieg. Organisationen, Methoden, Erfolge. Munich: Langen, 1979.
- Schröder, Hans Joachim. “German Soldiers' Experiences during the Initial Phase of the Russian Campaign.” In From Peace to War: Germany, Soviet Russia, and the World, 1939–1941, ed. Bernd Wegner, 309–59. Providence, RI: Berghahn, 1997.
- Schulte, Theo. The German Army and Nazi Policies in Occupied Russia. New York: Berg, 1988.
- Shepherd, Ben H. War in the Wild East: The German Army and Soviet Partisans. Cambridge, MA: Harvard University Press, 2004.
- Shepherd, Ben H. Hitler's Soldiers: The German Army in the Third Reich. New Haven and London: Yale University Press, 2016.
- Shore, Zachary. What Hitler Knew: The Battle for Information in Nazi Foreign Policy. Oxford: Oxford University Press, 2003.
- Smith, Peter. Luftwaffe at War: Defeat in the West 1943–1945 (Luftwaffe at War, Vol. 6). London: Greenhill Books, 1998.
- Smith, Peter. Luftwaffe at War: The Sea Eagles: The Luftwaffe's Maritime Operations. London: Greenhill Books, 2001.
- Smith, Peter. Luftwaffe at War: Stukas Over Steppe, Blitzkrieg in the East 1941–1944 (Luftwaffe at War Series, Vol. 9). London: Greenhill Books, 1999.
- Stargardt, Nicholas. The German War: A Nation Under Arms, 1939–1945. New York: Basic Books, 2015.
- Stein, George H. The Waffen SS: Hitler's Elite Guard at War, 1939–45. Ithaca, NY: Cornell University Press, 1984.
- Steinhoff, Johannes, Peter Pechel, and Dennis Showalter, eds. Deutsche im Zweiten Weltkrieg: Zeitzeugen Sprechen. Munich, 1989.
- Stone, David J. Shattered Genius: The Decline and Fall of the German General Staff in World War II. Philadelphia: Casemate, 2011.
- Stone, David J., and Richard Holmes. Fighting for the Fatherland: The Story of the German Soldier from 1648 to the Present Day. Herndon, VA: Potomac Books Inc., 2006.
- Streit, Christian. “The German Army and the Policies of Genocide.” In Gerhard Hirschfeld, ed., The Policies of Genocide: Jews and Soviet Prisoners of War in Nazi Germany, pp. 1–14. London: Allen & Unwin, 1986.
- Suchenwirth, Richard. The Development of the German Air Force, 1919–1939. New York: Arno Press, 1968.
- Sydnor, Charles W. Soldiers of Destruction: The SS Death's Head Division, 1933–1945. Princeton, NJ: Princeton University Press, 1977.
- Thomas, Charles S. The German Navy in the Nazi Era. London: Unwin Hyman, 1990.
- Uldricks, Teddy J. ed. Invasion 1944. Hamburg: E. S. Mittler, 1998.
- Ullrich, Volker. Eight Days in May: The Final Collapse of the Third Reich. Liveright, 2021.
- United States Library of Congress. Nazi Conspiracy and Aggression. 8 vols. 12 books. Washington, D.C.: U.S. Government Printing Office, 1945–1946.
- U.S. War Department. Handbook on German Military Forces. TM-E 30-451. Washington DC, 1945.
- Vollnhals, Clemens, ed. Wehrmacht, Verbrechen, Widerstand: Vier Beiträge zum nationalsozialistischen Weltanschauungskrieg. Dresden: Hannah-Arendt-Institut für Totalitarismusforschung e. V. an der Technischen Universität, 2003.
- Waite, Robert G. L. Vanguard of Nazism: The Free Corps Movement in Postwar Germany, 1918–1923. New York: Norton, 1952.
- Warmbrunn, Werner. The Dutch under German Occupation, 1940–1945. Stanford, CA: Stanford University Press, 1963.
- Wegner, Bernd. The Waffen-SS: Organization, Ideology, and Function. Oxford: Blackwell, 1988.
- Weinberg, Gerhard L. Hitler's Foreign Policy 1933–1939: The Road to World War II. New York: Enigma Books, 2005.
- Weinberg, Gerhard L. The Foreign Policy of Hitler's Germany: Diplomatic Revolution in Europe, 1933–1936. Chicago: University of Chicago Press, 1970.
- Weingartner, James J. Hitler's Guard: The Story of the Leibstandarte SS Adolf Hitler, 1933–1945. Carbondale, IL: Southern Illinois University Press, 1974.
- Westermann, Edward B. Hitler's Police Battalions: Enforcing Racial War in the East. Lawrence, KS: Kansas University Press, 2005.
- Wette, Wolfram. The Wehrmacht: History, Myth, Reality. Cambridge, MA: Harvard University Press, 2007.
- Wetzell, General Georg, ed. Die Deutsche Wehrmacht 1914–1939. Berlin: E. G. Mittler & Sohn, 1939.
- Wheeler-Bennett, Sir John. The Nemesis of Power: The German Army in Politics 1918–1945, Palgrave Macmillan: London: 2005, [1964], [1953].
- Williamson, Murray. Strategy for Defeat: The Luftwaffe 1933–1945. Maxwell AFB, Alabama: Air University Press (US Air Force), 1983.
- Wilt, Alan F. The Atlantic Wall, 1941–1944: Hitler's Defenses for D-Day. New York: Enigma Books, 2004.
- Wright, Burton. Army of Despair: The German Volkssturm, 1944–1945. Ann Arbor, MI: University of Michigan Press, 1983.
- Wüllner, Fritz. Die NS-Militärjustiz und das Elend der Geschichtsschreibung: Ein grundlegender Forschungsbericht. Baden-Baden: Nomos Verlag, 1991.
- Yelton, David K. Hitler's Volkssturm. The Nazi Militia and the Fall of Germany, 1944–1945. Lawrence, KS: University Press of Kansas, 2002.
- Zayas, Alfred de. Die Wehrmacht-Untersuchungsstelle: Deutsche Ermittlungen über Alliierte Völkerrechtsverletzungen im Zweiten Weltkrieg. Munich: Universitas, 1980.
- Zetterling, Niklas, and Anders Frankson. Kursk 1943: A Statistical Analysis. London: Frank Cass, 2000.
- Ziemke, Earl. Stalingrad to Berlin: The German Defeat in the East. Washington, DC: Office of the Chief of Military History, U.S. Army, 1968.
- Ziemke, Earl F. The U.S. Army in the Occupation of Germany, 1944–1946. Washington, D.C.: Center for Military History, U.S. Army, 1975.
- Ziemke, Earl, and Magna E. Bauer. Moscow to Stalingrad: Decision in the East. Washington, DC: Center of Military History, U.S. Army, 1987.
- Zumbro, Derek S. Battle for the Ruhr: The German Army's Final Defeat in the West. Lawrence: University Press of Kansas, 2006.

== Resistance and collaboration ==
- Ainsztein, Reuben. Jewish Resistance in Nazi-Occupied Eastern Europe. New York: Barnes & Noble, 1974.
- Ainsztein, Reuben. The Warsaw Ghetto Revolt. New York: Schocken, 1979.
- Altman, Linda Jacobs. Resisters and Rescuers: Standing Up against the Holocaust. The Holocaust in History. Berkeley Heights. N.J.: Enslow Publishers, 2003.
- Aubric, Lucy, et al. Outwitting the Gestapo. Lincoln, NE: University of Nebraska Press, 1994.
- Balfour, Michael L. Helmuth von Moltke: A Leader against Hitler. London: Macmillan, 1972.
- Balfour, Michael L. Withstanding Hitler in Germany 1933–1945. London: Routledge, 1988.
- Bar-Zohar, Michael. Beyond Hitler's Grasp: The Heroic Rescue of Bulgaria's Jews. Holbrook, MA: Adams Media Corporation, 2001.
- Barnett, Victoria. Bystanders: Conscience and Complicity During the Holocaust. Westport, Conn.: Greenwood, 1999.
- Barnett, Victoria. For the Soul of the People. Protestant Protest against Hitler. New York: Oxford University Press, 1992.
- Bartoszewski, Wladyslaw, and Zofia Lewin, eds. Righteous Among Nations: How Poles Helped the Jews, 1939–1945. London: Earlscourt Publications, 1969.
- Bauer, Yehuda. Flight and Rescue: Brichah, The Organized Escape of the Jewish Survivors of Eastern Europe, 1944–1948. New York: Random House, 1970.
- Bauer, Yehuda. The Jewish Emergence from Powerlessness. Toronto: University of Toronto Press, 1979.
- Benz, Wolfgang, and Walter Pehle, eds. Encyclopedia of German Resistance to the Nazi Movement. Translated by Lance W. Garmer. New York: Continuum International Publishing Group, 1977.
- Bethge, Eberhard. Dietrich Bonhoeffer: Man of Vision, Man of Courage. Trans. Eric Mosbacher et al. New York: Harper & Row, 1970.
- Bethge, Eberhard, and Renate Bethge. Last Letters of Resistance: Farewells from the Bonhoeffer Family. Philadelphia: Fortress Press, 1986.
- Beyerchen, Alan D. Scientists Under Hitler: Politics and the Physics Community in the Third Reich. New Haven, CT: Yale University Press, 1977.
- Block, Gay, and Malka Drucker. Rescuers: Portraits of Moral Courage in the Holocaust. New York: Holmes & Meier, 1992.
- Bowen, Wayne H. Spaniards and Nazi Germany: Collaboration in the New Order. Columbia, MO: University of Missouri Press, 2000.
- Burrin, Philippe. France Under the Germans: Collaboration and Compromise. New York: The New Press, 1997.
- Carsten, Francis L. (ed). The German Resistance to Hitler. Berkeley, CA: UC Press, 1970.
- Cartarius, Ulrich, and Institut für Auslandsbeziehungen. The German Resistance Movement 1933–1945: Information and Documentation Exhibition. Rev. ed. Stuttgart: Institut für Auslandsbeziehungen, 1988.
- Chandler, Andrew. The Moral Imperative: New Essays on the Ethics of Resistance in National Socialist Germany, 1933–1945. Widerstand, Dissent and Resistance in the Third Reich. Boulder, Colo.: Westview Press, 1998.
- Cobb, Matthew. The Resistance: The French Fight Against the Nazis. London & New York: Simon & Schuster, 2009.
- Cohen, Asher. The Halutz Resistance in Hungary, 1942–1944. New York: Columbia University Press, 1986.
- Cornwell, John. Hitler's Pope: The Secret History of Pius XII. New York: Viking Penguin, 1999.
- Dean, Martin C. Collaboration in the Holocaust: Crimes of the Local Police in Belorussia and Ukraine 1941–1944. New York: Palgrave Macmillan, 2003.
- Deutsch, Harold C. The Conspiracy Against Hitler in the Twilight War. Minneapolis: Minnesota University Press, 1968.
- Dulles, Allen Welsh. Germany's Underground: The Anti-Nazi Resistance. Cambridge, MA: Da Capo Press, 2000.
- Epstein, Barbara Leslie. The Minsk Ghetto, 1941–1943: Jewish Resistance and Soviet Internationalism. Berkeley, CA: University of California Press, 2008.
- Erikson, R.P., "A Radical Minority: Resistance in the German Protestant Church," in F.R.Nicosia and L.D.Stokes (eds.), Germans against Nazism. Nonconformity, Opposition and Resistance in the Third Reich. Oxford: Berg, 1990.
- Feingold, Henry L. The Politics of Rescue: The Roosevelt Administration and the Holocaust, 1938–1945. New Brunswick: Rutgers University Press, 1970.
- Fenyo, Mario. Hitler, Horthy and Hungary: German-Hungarian Relations, 1941–1944. New Haven: Yale University Press, 1972.
- Fest, Joachim. Plotting Hitler's Death: The Story of the German Resistance. New York: Henry Holt, 1996.
- Flender, Harold. Rescue in Denmark. New York: Holocaust Library, 1963.
- Fogelman, Eva. Conscience and Courage: Rescuers of Jews during the Holocaust. New York: Anchor, 1994.
- Foot, M. R. D. Resistance: European Resistance to Nazism, 1940–1945. New York: McGraw-Hill, 1977.
- Friedman, Philip. Their Brothers' Keepers: The Christian Heroes and Heroines Who Helped the Oppressed Escape the Nazi Terror. New York: Crown, 1957.
- Garbe, Detlef, and United States Holocaust Memorial Museum. Between Resistance and Martyrdom: Jehovah's Witnesses in the Third Reich. Madison: University of Wisconsin Press, 2007.
- Gellately, Robert. Backing Hitler: Consent and Coercion in Nazi Germany. New York: Oxford University Press, 2001.
- Geyer, Michael & John Boyer,(eds). Resistance Against the Third Reich, 1933–1990. Chicago: University of Chicago Press, 1994.
- Gill, Anton. An Honourable Defeat: A History of German Resistance to Hitler, 1933–1945. New York: Henry Holt, 1994.
- Goldberger, Leo, ed. The Rescue of the Danish Jews: Moral Courage under Stress. New York: New York University Press, 1987.
- Graml, Hermann, et al. The German Resistance to Hitler. Berkeley: University of California Press, 1970.
- Gutman, Israel. Resistance: The Warsaw Ghetto Uprising. Boston: Houghton Mifflin, 1994.
- Gutman, Israel. The Holocaust and Resistance: An Outline of Jewish History in Nazi Occupied Europe (1933–1945). Jerusalem: Yad Vashem, 1972.
- Gutman, Israel. The Jews of Warsaw, 1939–1943: Ghetto, Underground, Revolt. Bloomington: Indiana University Press, 1983.
- Gutman, Israel and Efraim Zuroff, eds. Rescue Attempts During the Holocaust. Jerusalem: Yad Vashem, 1977
- Hamerow, Theodore. On the Road to the Wolf 's Lair: German Resistance to Hitler. Cambridge, MA: Harvard University Press, 1997.
- Hansen, Randall. Disobeying Hitler: German Resistance after Valkyrie. New York: Oxford University Press, 2014.
- Hassell, Ulrich von. The Von Hassell Diaries, 1938–1944: The Story of the Forces against Hitler inside Germany, 1938–1944. Boulder, Colo.: Westview Press, 1994.
- Hayes, Peter. From Cooperation to Complicity: Degussa in the Third Reich. Cambridge: Cambridge University Press, 2004.
- Henry, Patrick. Jewish Resistance against the Nazis. Washington, DC: The Catholic University of America Press, 2014.
- Higham, Charles. American Swastika: The Shocking Story of Nazi Collaborators in our Midst from 1933 to the Present Day. New York: Doubleday, 1985.
- Hirschfeld, Gerhard. Nazi Rule and Dutch Collaboration: The Netherlands under German Occupation, 1940–1945. Oxford: Berg, 1988.
- Hoffmann, Peter. Stauffenberg: A Family History, 1905–1944. Cambridge: Cambridge University Press, 1995.
- Hoffmann, Peter. The History of the German Resistance, 1933–1945. Ontario: McGill-Queen's University Press, 1996.
- Housden, Martyn. Resistance and Conformity in the Third Reich. New York: Routledge, 2002.
- Jackson, Julian. France: The Dark Years, 1940–1944. New York: Oxford University Press, 2003.
- Kedward, Roderick. Occupied France: Collaboration And Resistance 1940–1944. Malden, MA: Blackwell Publishers, 1999.
- Kellner, Robert Scott, translator and editor. My Opposition: The Diary of Friedrich Kellner – A German against the Third Reich. New York: Cambridge University Press, 2018.
- Kershaw, Ian. Popular Opinion and Political Dissent in the Third Reich: Bavaria 1933–1945. New York & London: Oxford University Press, 2002.
- Klemperer, Klemens von. German Resistance against Hitler: The Search for Allies Abroad, 1938–1945. Gloucestershire, England: Clarendon Press, 1992.
- Kowalski, Isaac. A Secret Press in Nazi Europe: The Story of a Jewish United Partisan Organization. New York: Central Guide Publishers, 1969.
- Krakowski, Shmuel. The War of the Doomed: Jewish Armed Resistance in Poland, 1942–1944. New York: Holmes & Meier, 1984.
- Large, David Clay., ed. Contending with Hitler: Varieties of German Resistance in the Third Reich. Cambridge: Cambridge University Press, 1991.
- Langbein, Hermann. Against All Hope: Resistance in the Nazi Concentration Camps, 1938–1948. Trans. Harry Zohn. New York: Paragon House, 1994.
- Latour, Annie. The Jewish Resistance in France, 1940–1944. New York: Holocaust Library, 1981.
- Lazare, Lucien. Rescue as Resistance: How Jewish Organizations Fought the Holocaust in France. New York: Columbia University Press, 1996.
- Leitz, Christian. Economic Relations between Nazi Germany and Franco's Spain, 1936–1945. Oxford: Oxford University Press, 1996.
- Levendel, Isaac. Hunting Down the Jews: Vichy, the Nazis and Mafia Collaborators in Provence, 1942–1944. New York: Enigma Books, 2012.
- Levin, Dov. Fighting Back: Lithuanian Jewry's Armed Resistance to the Nazis, 1941–1945. New York: Holmes & Meier, 1985.
- Lochner, Louis P. Tycoons and Tyrants: German Industry from Hitler to Adenauer. Chicago: Henry Regnery, 1954.
- Locke, Hubert G., and Marcia Sachs Littell. Holocaust and Church Struggle: Religion, Power, and the Politics of Resistance. Studies in the Shoah, vol. 16. Lanham, Md.: University Press of America, 1996.
- MacDonald, Callum A. The Killing of SS Obergruppenfuehrer Reinhard Heydrich. New York: Macmillan, 1989.
- Marrus, Michael R., and Robert O. Paxton. Vichy France and the Jews. New York: Schocken Books, 1983.
- Mayer, Milton. They Thought They Were Free: The Germans, 1933–45. Chicago: University of Chicago Press, 1966.
- McDonough, Frank. Opposition and Resistance in Nazi Germany. Cambridge: Cambridge University Press, 2001.
- Meltzer, Milton. Rescue: The Story of How Gentiles Saved Jews in the Holocaust. New York: Harper Trophy, 1991.
- Merson, Allan. Communist Resistance in Nazi Germany. London: Lawrence and Wishart, 1986.
- Metaxas, Eric. Bonhoeffer: Pastor, Martyr, Prophet, Spy. Nashville, TN: Thomas Nelson, 2011.
- Michalczyk, John J. Confront! Resistance in Nazi Germany. New York: P. Lang, 2005.
- Milward, Alan S. The New Order and the French Economy. New York: Oxford University Press, 1970.
- Mommsen, Hans. Germans against Hitler: The Stauffenberg Plot and Resistance under the Third Reich. London and New York: I. B. Tauris, 2009.
- Mommsen, Hans, and Angus McGeoch. Alternatives to Hitler: German Resistance under the Third Reich. Princeton, N.J.: Princeton University Press, 2003
- Moorhouse, Roger. Killing Hitler. London: Jonathan Cape, 2006. ISBN 0-224-07121-1.
- Morley, John E. Vatican Diplomacy and the Jews During the Holocaust 1939–1943. New York: Ktav, 1980.
- Morse, Arthur D. While Six Million Died: A Chronicle of American Apathy. New York: Random House, 1968
- Mühlberger, Detlef. Hitler's Followers: Studies in the Sociology of the Nazi Movement. London: Routledge, 1991.
- Nicosia, Frances R., and Lawrence D. Stokes, eds. Germans Against Nazism: Nonconformity, Opposition and Resistance in the Third Reich. New York: Berg, 1991.
- Novitch, Miriam. Sobibor, Martyrdom and Revolt. New York: Schocken, 1980.
- Oliner, Samuel, and Pearl Oliner. The Altruistic Personality: Rescuers of Jews in Nazi Germany. New York: Free Press, 1988.
- Ottaway, Susan. Hitler's Traitors. Barnsley, England: L. Cooper, 2003.
- Packard, Jerrold. Neither Friend nor Foe: The European Neutrals in World War II. New York: Scribner, 1992.
- Paldiel, Mordecai. The Path of Righteousness: Gentile Rescuers of Jews during the Holocaust. Hoboken, N.J.: Ktav Publishing, 1993.
- Peukert, Detlev. Inside Nazi Germany: Conformity, Opposition and Racism in Everyday Life. New Haven: Yale University Press, 1987.
- Porter, Jack N., ed. Jewish Partisans, a Documentary of Jewish Resistance in the Soviet Union During World War II. 2 vols. Washington, DC: University Press of America, 1982.
- Ramati, Alexander. The Assisi Underground: The Priests Who Rescued Jews. New York: Stein & Day, 1978.
- Rashke, Richard. Escape from Sobibór. Boston: Houghton Mifflin, 1982.
- Rohrlich, Ruby, ed. Resisting the Holocaust. Oxford: Berg Publishers, 1998.
- Rosenhaft, Eve. “The Uses of Remembrance: The Legacy of the Communist Resistance in the German Democratic Republic.” In Germans against Nazism: Nonconformity, Opposition and Resistance in the Third Reich. Essays in Honour of Peter Hoffmann, edited by Francis R. Nicosia and Lawrence D. Stokes, 369–388. New York: Berg Publishers, 1990.
- Rosmus-Wenninger, Anja. Widerstand und Verfolgung: Am Beispiel Passaus, 1933–1939. Passau: Andreas-Haller Verlag, 1983.
- Rothfels, Hans. The German Opposition to Hitler: An Appraisal. Translated by Lawrence Wilson. Chicago: Henry Regnery, 1962.
- Schlabrendorff, Fabian von. The Secret War Against Hitler. London: Hodden & Stoughton, 1966.
- Schlabrendorff, Fabian von. They Almost Killed Hitler. New York: Macmillan, 1947.
- Scholl, Hans and Sophie (ed. Inge Jens). At the Heart of the White Rose: Letters and Diaries of Hans and Sophie Scholl. New York: Harper and Row, 1987.
- Scholl, Inge. Students Against Tyranny: The Resistance of the White Rose, Munich, 1942–1943. Middletown, CT: Wesleyan University Press, 1983.
- Shuter, Jane. Resistance to the Nazis. Chicago: Heinemann Library, 2003.
- Silver, Eric. The Book of the Just: The Unsung Heroes Who Rescued Jews from Hitler. New York: Grove Press, 1992.
- Smolar, Hersh. The Minsk Ghetto: Soviet-Jewish Partisans Against the Nazis. Trans. Max Rosenfeld. New York: Holocaust Library, 1989.
- Snyder, Louis L. Hitler's German Enemies. New York: Berkley Books, 1992.
- Stadtler, Bea. The Holocaust: A History of Courage and Resistance. West Orange, NJ: Behrman, 1975.
- Stauber, Roni. Collaboration with the Nazis: Public Discourse after the Holocaust (Routledge Jewish Studies Series). New York: Routledge, 2010.
- Steinbach, Peter, John M. Grossman, Johannes Tuchel, and Gedenkstätte Deutscher Widerstand, eds. Exhibition, Resistance to National Socialism. Berlin: Gedenkstätte Deutscher Widerstand, 1990.
- Steinberg, Jonathan. All or Nothing: The Axis and the Holocaust, 1941–1943. London: Routledge, 1990.
- Steinberg, Lucien. Not as a Lamb: The Jews against Hitler. London: Gordon and Cremonesi, 1978.
- Stoltzfus, Nathan. Resistance of the Heart: Intermarriage and the Rosenstrasse Protest in Nazi Germany. New York: W. W. Norton, 1996.
- Suhl, Yuri, ed. They Fought Back: The Story of Jewish Resistance in Nazi Europe. New York: Schocken, 1975.
- Sweets, John. Choices in Vichy France: The French under Nazi Occupation. New York: Oxford University Press, 1986.
- Syrkin, Marie. Blessed Is The Match: The Story of Jewish Resistance. Philadelphia: Jewish Publication Society, 1948.
- Tec, Nechama. Defiance: The Bielski Partisans. New York: Oxford University Press, 1993.
- Tec, Nechama. When Light Pierced the Darkness: Christian Rescue of Jews in Nazi Occupied Poland. New York: Oxford University Press, 1986.
- Thomsett, Michael C. The German Opposition to Hitler: The Resistance, the Underground, and Assassination Plots, 1938–1945. Jefferson, N.C.: McFarland, 1997.
- Tillich, Paul. Against the Third Reich: Paul Tillich's Wartime Addresses to Nazi Germany. Edited by Ronald H. Stone. Translated by Matthew Lon Weaver. Louisville, KY: Westminster John Knox Press, 1998.
- United States Holocaust Memorial Museum. Resistance during the Holocaust. Washington, DC: 1997. Jewish Resistance
- Urwand, Ben. The Collaboration: Hollywood's Pact with Hitler. Cambridge, MA: Harvard University Press, 2013.
- Waters, Donald Arthur. Hitler's Secret Ally, Switzerland. Le Mesa, CA: Pertinent Publications, 1994.
- Webster, Paul. Pétain's Crime: The Complete Story of French Collaboration in the Holocaust. Chicago: Ivan R. Dee, 1991.
- Werner, Emmy E. A Conspiracy of Decency: The Rescue of the Danish Jews During World War II. Boulder, CO: Westview, 2002.
- Werner, Harold. Fighting Back: A Memoir of Jewish Resistance in World War II. New York: Columbia University Press, 1992.
- Wolf, Hubert. Pope and Devil: The Vatican's Archives and the Third Reich. Cambridge, MA: Belknap Press of Harvard University Press, 2010.
- Yahil, Leni. The Rescue of Danish Jewry. Philadelphia: Jewish Publication Society, 1969.
- Young, Ian. Gay Resistance: Homosexuals in the Anti-Nazi Underground. Toronto: Stubblejumper Press, 1985.
- Zeller, Eberhard. The Flame of Freedom: The German Struggle against Hitler. Translated by R. P. Heller and D. R. Masters. Boulder, CO: Westview Press, 1994.
- Ziegler, Jean. The Swiss, The Gold And The Dead: How Swiss Bankers Helped Finance the Nazi War Machine. London & New York: Houghton Mifflin Harcourt, 1998.
- Zuckerman, Yitzhak. A Surplus of Memory: Chronicle of the Warsaw Ghetto Uprising. Berkeley, CA: University of California Press, 1993.

== Society, culture, work, memory, and post-war considerations ==
- Aarons, Mark, and John Loftus. Unholy Trinity: The Vatican, the Nazis, and Soviet Intelligence. New York: St. Martin's Press, 1991.
- Adam, Peter. Art of the Third Reich. New York: H.N Abrams, 1992.
- Allert, Tilman. Deutsche Gruß, the Hitler Salute: On the Meaning of a Gesture. New York: Henry Holt and Company, 2008.
- Anderson, Mark, ed. Hitler’s Exiles: Personal Stories of the Flight from Nazi Germany to America. New York: New Press, 1998.
- Andrus, Burton C. The Infamous of Nuremberg. London: Leslie Frewin, 1969.
- Angress, Werner. Between Fear and Hope: Jewish Youth in the Third Reich. New York: Columbia University Press, 1988.
- Art, David. The Politics of the Nazi Past in Germany and Austria. New York & London: Cambridge University Press, 2005.
- Ayçoberry, Pierre. The Social History of the Third Reich, 1933–1945. New York: The New Press, 1999.
- Bacht, Nikolaus. Music, Theatre and Politics in Germany: 1848 to the Third Reich. Aldershot, England: Ashgate, 2006.
- Bacque, James. Crimes and Mercies: The Fate of German Civilians under Allied Occupation, 1944–1950. London: Warner Books, 1997.
- Baird, Jay W. Hitler's War Poets: Literature and Politics in the Third Reich. New York: Cambridge University Press, 2008.
- Baldwin, Peter, ed. Reworking the Past: Hitler, the Holocaust, and the Historians' Debate. Boston: Beacon, 1990.
- Bankier, David. The Germans and the Final Solution: Public Opinion under Nazism. New York: Blackwell, 1992.
- Baranowski, Shelley. Strength through Joy: Consumerism and Mass Tourism in the Third Reich. New York: Cambridge University Press, 2004.
- Baranowski, Shelley. The Confessing Church, Conservative Elites, and the Nazi State. Lewiston, NY: Edwin Mellen, 1987.
- Barnouw, Dagmar. Germany 1945: Views of War and Violence. Bloomington: Indiana University Press, 1996.
- Barnow, Dagmar. The War in the Empty Air: Victims, Perpetrators, and Postwar Germans. Bloomington: Indiana University Press, 2005.
- Bäumer-Schleinkofer, Änne. Nazi Biology and Schools. Frankfurt am Main: Peter Lang, 1995.
- Beck, Earl R. Under the Bombs: The German Home Front, 1942–1945. Lexington, KY: University Press of Kentucky, 1986.
- Benton, Wilbourn E. and Georg Grimm, eds. Nuremberg: German Views of the War Trials. Dallas: Southern Methodist University Press, 1970.
- Bergen, Doris. Twisted Cross: The German Christian Movement in the Third Reich. Chapel Hill: UNC Press, 1996.
- Berghahn, V.R. Modern Germany: Society, Economy and Politics in the Twentieth Century. Cambridge: Cambridge University Press, 1987.
- Bergmeier, H. J. P. and Rainer E. Lotz. Hitler's Airwaves: The Inside Story of Nazi Radio Broadcasting and Propaganda Swing. New Haven, CT: Yale University Press, 1997.
- Berkley, George. Vienna and Its Jews: The Tragedy of Success 1880s–1980s. Cambridge, MA: Abt Books, 1988.
- Bessel, Richard. Germany 1945: From War to Peace. New York: Harper Perennial, 2010.
- Bessel, Richard. Life in the Third Reich. New York: Oxford University Press, 1987.
- Beyel, Hans P. Sex and Society in Nazi Germany. Philadelphia: Lippincott Company, 1976.
- Beyerchen, Alan D. Scientists Under Hitler. New Haven, CT: Yale University Press, 1982.
- Bielenberg, Christabel. When I Was a German: An Englishwoman in Nazi Germany. Lincoln: University of Nebraska Press, 1998.
- Biddiscombe, Perry. Werwolf! The History of the National Socialist Guerrilla Movement, 1944–1946. Toronto: Univ. of Toronto Press, 1998.
- Blackburn, Gilmer W. Education in the Third Reich: A Study of Race and History in Nazi Textbooks. Albany: State University of New York Press, 1985.
- Bleuel, Hans Peter. Sex and Society in Nazi Germany. Philadelphia: J.B. Lippincott, 1973.
- Bleuel, Hans Peter. Strength through Joy: Sex and Society in Nazi Germany. London: Seeker & Warburg, 1973.
- Boberach, Heinz, ed. Berichte des SD und der Gestapo über Kirchen und Kirchenvolk in Deutschland, 1934–1944. Mainz: Mathias Grünewald Verlag, 1971.
- Bodemann, Michal, ed. Jews, Germans, Memory: Reconstructions of Jewish Life in Germany. Ann Arbor: University of Michigan Press, 1996.
- Borkin, Joseph. The Crime and Punishment of I. G. Farben. New York: Free Press, 1978.
- Bosch, William J. Judgment on Nuremberg. Chappel Hill, NC: The University of North Carolina Press, 1970.
- Boswell, Matthew. Holocaust Impiety in Literature, Popular Music and Film. Basingstoke: Palgrave Macmillan, 2012.
- Botting, Douglas. From the Ruins of the Reich: Germany, 1945–1949. New York: Crown, 1985.
- Brenner, Michael. After the Holocaust: Rebuilding Jewish Lives in Postwar Germany. Translated by Barbara Harshav. Princeton, NJ: Princeton University Press, 1997.
- Brüggemeier, Franz-Josef, Mark Cioc, and Thomas Zeller. How Green Were the Nazis?: Nature, Environment, and Nation in the Third Reich. Athens, OH: Ohio University Press, 2005.
- Brustein, William. The Logic of Evil: The Social Origins of the Nazi Party, 1925–1933. New Haven, CT: Yale University Press, 1996.
- Bukey, Evan Burr. Hitler's Austria: Popular Sentiment in the Nazi Era, 1938–1945. Chapel Hill: University of North Carolina Press, 2000.
- Bytwerk, Randall L. Bending Spines: The Propaganda of Nazi Germany and the German Democratic Republic. East Lansing: Michigan State University Press, 2004.
- Calvocoressi, Peter. Nuremberg. New York: MacMillan, 1948.
- Campbell, Joan. Joy in Work, German Work: The National Debate, 1800–1945. Princeton: Princeton Univ. Press, 1989.
- Caplan, Jane. Government without Administration: State and Civil Service in Weimar and Nazi Germany. Oxford: Clarendon, 1988.
- Carsten, Francis L. The German Workers and the Nazis. Aldershot: Scolar, 1995.
- Childers, Thomas, ed. The Formation of the Nazi Constituency 1919–1933. London: Croom Helm, 1986.
- Childers, Thomas. The Nazi Voter: The Social Foundations of Fascism in Germany, 1919–1933. Chapel Hill: UNC Press, 1983.
- Clinefelter, Joan L. Artists for the Reich: Culture and Race from Weimar to Nazi Germany. Oxford: Berg, 2005.
- Cocks, Geoffrey. Psychotherapy in the Third Reich: The Göring Institute. New York: Oxford University Press, 1985.
- Conot, Robert E. Justice at Nuremberg. New York: Carroll & Graf Publishers Inc., 1993.
- Conway, John S. Nazi Persecution of the Churches, 1933–1945. New York: Basic Books, 1968.
- Cornwell, John. Hitler's Scientists: Science, War, and the Devil's Pact. New York: Penguin Press, 2004.
- Cosner, Shaaron and Cosner, Victoria. Women under the Third Reich: A Biographical Dictionary. Greenwood, 1998. 203 pp.
- Cox, Geoffrey. Psychotherapy and the Third Reich. New York: Oxford University Press, 1988.
- Cowdery, Ray, and Josephine Cowdery. Papers Please! Identity Documents, Permits and Authorizations of the Third Reich. Rogers, MN: Victory, 1996.
- Cuomo, Glen R., ed. National Socialist Cultural Policy, New York, St Martin's Press, 1995.
- Currid, Brian. A National Acoustics Music and Mass Publicity in Weimar and Nazi Germany. Minneapolis: University of Minnesota Press, 2006.
- Dalton, Margaret Stieg. Public Libraries in Nazi Germany. Tuscaloosa: University of Alabama Press, 1992.
- Deichmann, Ute. Biologists under Hitler. Cambridge, Mass.: Harvard University Press, 1996.
- Dennis, David B. Inhumanities: Nazi Interpretations of Western Culture. New York: Cambridge University Press, 2012.
- Diefendorf, Jeffry M. In the Wake of War: The Reconstruction of German Cities after World War II. New York: Oxford University Press, 1993.
- Dietrich, Donald J. Catholic Citizens in the Third Reich: Psycho-social Principles and Moral Reasoning. New Brunswick, NJ: Transaction, 1988.
- Dietrich, Donald J. Christian Responses to the Holocaust: Moral and Ethical Issues. Religion, Theology, and the Holocaust. Syracuse: Syracuse University Press, 2003.
- Domansky, Elisabeth. “A Lost War: World War II in Postwar German Memory.” In Thinking about the Holocaust after Half a Century, edited by Alvin H. Rosenfeld, 233–72. Bloomington: Indiana University Press, 1997.
- Douglas, R. M. Orderly and Humane: The Expulsion of the Germans after the Second World War. New Haven & London: Yale University Press, 2012.
- Dwork, Deborah. Children with a Star: Jewish Youth in Nazi Europe. New Haven: Yale University Press, 1991.
- Eley, Geoff. From Unification to Nazism: Reinterpreting the German Past. Boston: Allen & Unwin, 1986.
- Eley, Geoff. The Goldhagen Effect: History, Memory, Nazism – Facing the German Past. Social History, Popular Culture, and Politics in Germany. Ann Arbor: University of Michigan Press, 2000.
- Engelmann, Bernt. In Hitler's Germany: Daily Life in the Third Reich. trans. Krishna Winston. New York: Pantheon, 1986.
- Ericksen, Robert P. Theologians Under Hitler. New Haven, CT: Yale University Press, 1985.
- Etlin, Richard A. Art, Culture, and Media Under the Third Reich. Chicago: University of Chicago Press, 2002.
- Evans, Richard J. In Hitler's Shadow: West German Historians and the Attempt to Escape from the Nazi Past. New York: Pantheon, 1989.
- Evans, Richard J. Rereading German History: From Unification to Reunification 1800–1996. New York: Routledge, 1997.
- Evans, Richard J. The Third Reich in History and Memory. New York: Oxford University Press, 2015.
- Farquharson, J.E. The Plough and the Swastika: N.S.D.A.P. and Agriculture in Germany, 1928–1945. Bloomington: Indiana University Press, 1976.
- Feige, Franz G. M. The Varieties of Protestantism in Nazi Germany: Five Theopolitical Positions. Toronto Studies in Theology, vol. 50. Lewiston, NY: E. Mellen Press, 1990.
- Fisher, Marc. After the Wall: Germany, the Germans, and the Burdens of History. New York: Simon & Schuster, 1995.
- Freiwald, Aaron. The Last Nazi: Josef Schwammberger and the Nazi Past. New York: W.W. Norton, 1994.
- Friedman, Ina, ed. The Other Victims: First-Person Stories of Non-Jews Persecuted by the Nazis. Boston: Houghton Mifflin, 1990.
- Fritzsche, Peter. Rehearsals for Fascism. Populism and Political Mobilization in Weimar Germany. Oxford: Oxford University Press, 1990.
- Fritzsche, Peter. Germans into Nazis. Cambridge, MA: Harvard University Press, 1999.
- Fritzsche, Peter. Life and Death in the Third Reich. Cambridge, MA: Belknap Press of Harvard University Press, 2008.
- Fritzsche, Peter. An Iron Wind: Europe under Hitler. New York: Basic Books, 2016.
- Fritzsche, Peter. Hitler's First Hundred Days: When Germans Embraced the Third Reich. New York: Basic Books, 2020.
- Fulbrook, Mary. German National Identity after the Holocaust. Cambridge: Polity, 1999.
- Funke, Manfred. Starker oder schwacher Diktator? Hitlers Herrschaft und die Deutschen: ein Essay. Duesseldorf: Droste, 1989.
- Gallagher, Hugh. By Trust Betrayed: Patients, Physicians, and the License to Kill in the Third Reich. New York: Henry Holt, 1990.
- Garson, G. Paul. Album of the Damned: Snapshots from the Third Reich. Chicago: Chicago Academy Publishers, 2008.
- Garson, G. Paul. New Images of Nazi Germany: A Photographic Collection. Jefferson, NC: McFarland, 2012.
- Gellately, Robert. Hitler's True Believers: How Ordinary People Became Nazis. Oxford and New York: Oxford University Press, 2020.
- Gellately, Robert, and Nathan Stoltzfus. Social Outsiders in Nazi Germany. Princeton, N.J.: Princeton University Press, 2001.
- Giesen, Rolf. Nazi Propaganda Films: A History and Filmography. Jefferson, NC: McFarland, 2003.
- Giles, Geoffrey. Students and National Socialism in Germany. Princeton, NJ: Princeton University Press, 1985.
- Giles, Geoffrey, ed. Stunde Null: The End and the Beginning Fifty Years Ago (Occasional Paper No. 20). Washington, D.C.: German Historical Institute, 1997.
- Glaser, Hermann. Rubble Years: The Cultural Roots of Postwar Germany, 1945–1948. New York: Paragon House, 1986.
- Gollancz, Victor. The Case of Adolf Eichmann. London: The Camelot Press, 1961.
- Greenfeld, Howard. The Hidden Children. New York: Ticknor and Fields, 1993.
- Grunberger, Richard. The 12 Year Reich: A Social History of the Third Reich, 1933–1945. New York: Holt, Rinehart & Winston, 1971.
- Guenther, Irene. Nazi Chic? Fashioning Women in the Third Reich. Oxford: Berg, 2004.
- Gutteridge, Richard. The German Evangelical Church and the Jews, 1879–1950. New York: Barnes & Noble, 1976.
- Hagen, William. German History in Modern Times: Four Lives of the Nation. New York & London: Cambridge University Press, 2012.
- Hake, Sabine. Popular Cinema of the Third Reich. Austin, TX: University of Texas Press, 2001.
- Hale, Oron J. The Captive Press in the Third Reich. Princeton, NJ: Princeton University Press, 1964.
- Hamilton, Richard. Who Voted For Hitler? Princeton, N.J.: Princeton University Press, 1982.
- Hardy, Alexander. Hitler's Secret Weapon: The “Managed” Press and Propaganda Machine of Nazi Germany. New York: Vantage, 1967.
- Hastings, Derek. Catholicism and the Roots of Nazism: Religious Identity and National Socialism. New York: Oxford University Press, 2010.
- Haynes, Stephen R. The Bonhoeffer Legacy: Post-Holocaust Perspectives. Minneapolis: Fortress Press, 2006.
- Heineman, Elizabeth. What Difference Does a Husband Make? Women and Marital Status in Nazi and Postwar Germany. Berkeley: Univ. of California Press, 1999.
- Helmreich, Ernst. The German Churches Under Hitler: Background, Struggle, and Epilogue. Detroit: Wayne State University Press, 1980.
- Herf, Jeffrey. Divided Memory: The Nazi Past in the Two Germanys. Cambridge, Mass.: Harvard University Press, 1997.
- Herf, Jeffrey . Reactionary Modernism: Technology, Culture, and Politics in Weimar and the Third Reich. New York & London: Cambridge University Press, 1984.
- Herzog, Dagmar. Sexuality and German Fascism. New York: Berghahn Books, 2004.
- Heschel, Susannah. The Aryan Jesus: Christian Theologians and the Bible in Nazi Germany. Princeton, N.J.: Princeton University Press, 2008.
- Heschel, Susannah. Transforming Jesus from Jew to Aryan: Protestant Theologians in Nazi Germany. Albert T. Bilgray Lecture. Tucson: University of Arizona, 1995.
- Hilberg, Raul. The Politics of Memory: The Journey of a Holocaust Historian. Chicago: Ivan R. Dee, 1996.
- Hinz, Berthold. Art in the Third Reich. New York: Pantheon, 1979.
- Hirsch, Herbert. Genocide and the Politics of Memory: Studying Death to Preserve Life. Chapel Hill: University of North Carolina Press, 1995.
- Hockenos, Matthew D. A Church Divided: German Protestants Confront the Nazi Past. Bloomington: Indiana University Press, 2004.
- Huener, Jonathan, and Francis R. Nicosia. The Arts in Nazi Germany: Continuity, Conformity, Change. New York: Berghahn Books, 2006.
- Jackson, Robert H. The Nürnberg Case. New York: Alfred A. Knopf, 1947.
- Jarausch, Konrad H. After Hitler: Recivilizing Germans, 1945–1995. New York: Oxford University Press, 2008.
- Johnson, Eric A. What We Knew: Terror, Mass Murder and Everyday Life in Nazi Germany: An Oral History. Cambridge, MA: Basic Books, 2005.
- Kamenetsky, Christa. Children's Literature in Nazi Germany: The Cultural Policy of National Socialism. Athens, OH: Ohio University Press, 1984.
- Kaplan, Harold. Conscience and Memory: Meditations in a Museum of the Holocaust. Chicago: University of Chicago Press, 1994.
- Karina, Lilian and Marion Kant. Hitler's Dancers: German Modern Dance and the Third Reich. New York: Berghahn Books, 2003.
- Kater, Michael. Doctors under Hitler. Chapel Hill: University of North Carolina Press, 1989.
- Kater, Michael. The Twisted Muse: Musicians and Their Music in the Third Reich. New York: Oxford University Press, 1997.
- Kater, Michael, and Albrecht Riethmüller. Music and Nazism: Art under Tyranny, 1933–1945. Laaber: Laaber Verlag, 2003.
- Kater, Michael. Culture in Nazi Germany. New Haven and London: Yale University Press, 2019.
- Keeley, Jennifer. Life in the Hitler Youth. San Diego: Lucent Books, 2000.
- Kellner, Friedrich. My Opposition. Glessen: Justus Liebig University, 2011.
- Kirk, Tim. Nazism and the Working Class in Austria: Industrial Unrest and Political Dissent in the National Community. New York: Cambridge University Press, 1996.
- Kirkpatrick, Clifford. Nazi Germany: Its Women and Family Life. New York: AMS Press, 1981.
- Kitchen, Martin. The Third Reich: Charisma and Community. New York: Pearson Longman, 2008.
- Kittel, Manfred. Die Legende von der “Zweiten Schuld”: Vergangenheitsbewältigung in der Ära Adenauer. Frankfurt /Main: Ullstein, 1993.
- Klemperer, Victor. Language of the Third Reich: LTI: Lingua Tertii Imperii. New York & London: Continuum, 2006.
- Koehl, Robert. RKFDV: German Resettlement and Population Policy, 1939–1945. A History of the Reich Commission for the Strengthening of Germandom. Cambridge: Harvard University Press, 1957.
- Koonz, Claudia. Mothers in the Fatherland: Women, the Family, and Nazi Politics. New York: St. Martin's Press, 1987. ISBN 0-312-54933-4.
- Komjathy, Anthony, and Rebecca Stockwell. German Minorities and the Third Reich. New York: Holmes & Meier, 1980.
- Koshar, Rudy. Social Life, Local Politics, and Nazism, 1880–1935. Chapel Hill, NC: University of North Carolina Press, 1986.
- Kossert, Andreas. Kalte Heimat: Die Geschichte der deutschen Vertriebenen nach 1945. München: Pantheon Verlag, 2009.
- Kramer, Jane. The Politics of Memory: Looking for Germany in the New Germany. New York: Random House, 1996.
- Krieg, Robert Anthony. Catholic Theologians in Nazi Germany. New York: Continuum, 2004.
- Kruger, Horst. The Crack in the Wall, Growing Up Under Hitler. New York: Fromm International, 1982.
- Kurthen, Hermann, Werner Bergmann, and Rainer Erb, eds. Antisemitism and Xenophobia in Germany after Unification. New York: Oxford University Press, 1997.
- LaCapra, Dominick. History and Memory after Auschwitz. Ithaca, N.Y.: Cornell University Press, 1998.
- Lane, Barbara Miller. Architecture and Politics in Germany, 1918–1945. Cambridge: Harvard University Press, 1968.
- LeConte, John. The Priest and the Nazi. Titusville, N.J.: Hopewell Publications, 2006.
- Leiser, Erwin. Nazi Cinema. Gertrud Mander, trans. London: Secker and Warburg, 1974.
- Levi, Erik. Music in the Third Reich. New York: St. Martin's Press, 1994.
- Levy, Alan. The Wiesenthal File. London: Constable, 1993.
- Lewy, Guenter. The Catholic Church and Nazi Germany. New York: McGraw Hill, 1964.
- Lichtblau, Eric. The Nazis Next Door: How America Became a Safe Haven for Hitler's Men. Boston and New York: Houghton Mifflin, 2014.
- Lilienthal, Georg. Der “ Lebensborn e.V.”. Ein Instrument nationalsozialistischer Rassenpolitik. Frankfurt: Fischer Verlag, 2003.
- Lipstadt, Deborah. Denying the Holocaust: The Growing Assault on Truth and Memory. New York: Free Press, 1993.
- Littell, Franklin H. and H.G.Locke (eds). The German Church Struggle and the Holocaust. Detroit: Wayne State University Press, 1974.
- London, John. Theater under the Nazis. Manchester: Manchester University Press, 2000.
- Lumans, Valdis O. Himmler's Auxiliaries: The Volksdeutsche Mittelstelle and the German National Minorities of Europe, 1933–1945. Chapel Hill: University of North Carolina Press, 1993.
- Lyttle, Richard B. Nazi Hunting. New York: Franklin Watts, 1982.
- MacDonogh, Giles. After the Reich: The Brutal History of the Allied Occupation. New York: Basic Books, 2009.
- Macrakis, Kristie. Surviving the Swastika: Scientific Research in Nazi Germany. New York: Oxford University Press, 1993.
- Maier, Charles. The Unmasterable Past: History, Holocaust, and German National Identity. Cambridge, Mass.: Harvard University Press, 1988.
- Maier-Katkin, Birgit. Silence and Acts of Memory: A Postwar Discourse on Literature, History, Anna Seghers, and Women in the Third Reich. Lewisburg: Bucknell University Press, 2007.
- Martin, Elaine. Gender, Patriarchy, and Fascism in the Third Reich: The Response of Women Writers. Detroit: Wayne State University Press, 1993.
- Mason, Tim. Nazism, Fascism and the Working Class. Edited by Jane Caplan. Cambridge: Cambridge University Press, 1995.
- Mason, Timothy W., and Jane Caplan. Social Policy in the Third Reich: The Working Class and the National Community. Providence: Berg, 1993.
- Matas, David. Bringing Nazi War Criminals in Canada to Justice. Downsview, Ontario: League for Human Rights of B'nai B'rith Canada, 1985.
- Matheson, Peter (ed.). The Third Reich and the Christian Churches. Grand Rapids MI: Eerdmans Press, 1981.
- McClelland, Charles E., and Steven P. Scher, eds. Postwar German Culture: An Anthology. New York: E. P. Dutton, 1974.
- McKale, Donald M. The Nazi Party Courts: Hitler's Management of Conflicts in his Movement, 1921–1945. Lawrence: University Press of Kansas, 1974.
- McFarland-Icke, Bronwyn Rebekah. Nurses in Nazi Germany: Moral Choice in History. Princeton: Princeton University Press, 1999.
- Merritt, Anna, and Richard Merritt, eds. Public Opinion in Occupied Germany: The OMGUS Surveys, 1945–1949. Urbana: University of Illinois Press, 1970.
- Merseburger, Peter. Mythos Weimar: Zwischen Geist und Macht. Stuttgart: Pantheon Verlag, 2013.
- Meyer, Michael. The Politics of Music in the Third Reich. New York: Peter Lang, 1993.
- Michalczyk, John J. Medicine, Ethics, and the Third Reich: Historical and Contemporary Issues. Kansas City, Mo.: Sheed & Ward, 1994.
- Michaud, Eric. The Cult of Art in Nazi Germany, translated by Janet Lloyd. Stanford: Stanford University Press, 2004. ISBN 0-8047-4327-4.
- Moeller, Robert G. The Nazi State and German Society: A Brief History with Documents (Bedford Series in History and Culture). New York: St. Martin's Press, 2009.
- Mommsen, Hans. Der Nationalsozialismus und die deutsche Gesellschaft: Ausgewählte Aufsätze. Reinbek bei Hamburg: Rowohlt, 1991
- Mosse, George L. Nazi Culture: Intellectual, Cultural, and Social Life in the Third Reich. New York: Grosset & Dunlap, 1966.
- Muehlberger, Detlef. Hitler's Followers. Studies in the Sociology of the Nazi Movement. London: Routledge, 1991.
- Muehlberger, Detlef. The Social Bases of Nazism, 1919-1933. New York: Cambridge University Press, 2003.
- Müller, Ingo. Hitler's Justice: The Courts of the Third Reich. Cambridge, Mass.: Harvard University Press, 1991.
- Neuberger, Helmut. Winkelmaß und Hakenkreuz. Die Freimaurer und das Dritte Reich. München: Herbig Verlagsbuchhandlung, 2001.
- Nicholas, Lynn H. Cruel World: The Children of Europe in the Nazi Web. New York: Vintage, 2006.
- Nicosia, Francis R., and Jonathan Huener. Medicine and Medical Ethics in Nazi Germany: Origins, Practices, Legacies. New York: Berghahn Books, 2002.
- Niven, William John. Facing the Nazi Past: United Germany and the Legacy of the Third Reich. London: Routledge, 2002.
- Noelle Elisabeth, and Erich Neumann, eds. The Germans: Public Opinion Polls, 1947–1966. Westport, CT: Greenwood Press, 1981.
- Office of United States Chief of Counsel for Prosecution of Axis Criminality. Nazi Conspiracy and Aggression: Opinion and Judgment. Washington: U.S. G.P.O., 1947–1948.
- Owings, Alison. Frauen: German Women Recall the Third Reich. New Brunswick, NJ: Rutgers University Press, 1993.
- Pauwels, Jacques R. Women, Nazis, and Universities: Female University Students in the Third Reich, 1933–1945. Contributions in Women's Studies, no. 50. Westport, Conn.: Greenwood Press, 1984.
- Peterson, Edward N. The Many Faces of Defeat: The German People’s Experience in 1945. New York: Peter Lang, 1990.
- Petley, Julian. Capital and Culture: German Cinema, 1933–45. London: Educational Advisory Service, British Film Institute, 1979
- Petropoulos, Jonathan. Art as Politics in the Third Reich. Chapel Hill: University of North Carolina Press, 1996.
- Petropoulos, Jonathan. The Faustian Bargain: The Art World in Nazi Germany. New York: Oxford University Press, 2000.
- Phayer, Michael. Protestant and Catholic Women in Nazi Germany. Detroit: Wayne State University Press, 1990.
- Phayer, Michael. The Catholic Church and the Holocaust, 1930–1965. Bloomington: Indiana University Press, 2000.
- Pine, Lisa. Education in Nazi Germany. Oxford: Berg Publishers, 2010.
- Pine, Lisa. Nazi Family Policy, 1933–1945. Oxford: Berg, 1997.
- Probst, Christopher. Demonizing the Jews: Luther and the Protestant Church in Nazi Germany. Bloomington: Indiana University Press, 2012.
- Proctor, Robert. Racial Hygiene: Medicine under the Nazis. Cambridge, MA: Harvard University Press, 1988.
- Pronay, Michael, and Keith Wilson, eds. The Political Re-education of Germany and Her Allies after World War II. Totowa, NJ: Barnes and Noble, 1985.
- Rabinbach, Anson, and Wolfgang Bialas, eds. Nazi Germany and the Humanities. Oxford: Oneworld, 2007.
- Rebentisch, Dieter & Karl Teppe (eds.). Verwaltung contra Menschenfuehrung im Staat Hitlers. Studien zum politisch-administrativen System. Goettingen, Vandenhoeck Verlag, 1986.
- Reese, Dagmar. Growing Up Female in Nazi Germany. Social History, Popular Culture, and Politics in Germany. Ann Arbor: University of Michigan Press, 2006.
- Reichel, Peter. Politik mit der Errinerung: Gedächtnisorte im Streit um die nationalsozialistische Vergangenheit. Munich: Carl Hanser, 1995.
- Reimer, Robert C., ed. Cultural History through a National Socialist Lens: Essays on the Cinema of the Third Reich. Rochester, N.Y.: Camden House, 2000.
- Rempel, Gerhard (1989). Hitler's Children: The Hitler Youth and the SS. Archived from the original on 2007-12-10 – via Questia.
- Remy, Steven P. The Heidelberg Myth: The Nazification and Denazification of a German University. Cambridge, Mass.: Harvard University Press, 2002.
- Rentschler, Eric. The Ministry of Illusion: Nazi Cinema and its Afterlife. Cambridge, MA: Harvard University Press, 1996.
- Rittner, Carol, and John Roth, eds. Different Voices: Women and the Holocaust. New York: Paragon House, 1993.
- Rodnick, David. Postwar Germans: An Anthropologist's Account. New Haven: Yale Univ. Press, 1948.
- Roseman, Mark. A Past in Hiding: Memory and Survival in Nazi Germany. New York: Metropolitan Books, 2000.
- Rosenbaum, Alan S. Prosecuting Nazi War Criminals. Boulder, CO: Westview Press, 1993.
- Ruhl, Klaus-Jörg. Unsere verlorenen Jahre: Frauenalltag in Kriegs-und Nachkriegszeit 1939–1949 in Berichten, Dokumenten und Bildern. Darmstadt: Luchterhand, 1985.
- Russell, Edward Frederick Langley. The Scourge of the Swastika. New York: Philosophical Library, 1954.
- Ryan, Allan. Quiet Neighbors: Prosecution of Nazi War Criminals. San Diego: Harcourt, Brace & Jovanovich, 1984.
- Ryan, Donna F., and John S. Schuchman. Deaf People in Hitler's Europe. Washington, DC: Gallaudet University Press, 2002.
- Schivelbusch, Wolfgang. In a Cold Crater: Cultural and Intellectual Life in Berlin, 1945–1948. Berkeley and Los Angeles: University of California Press, 1998.
- Schmitz, Helmut. German Culture and the Uncomfortable Past: Representations of National Socialism in Contemporary Germanic Literature. Aldershot: Ashgate, 2001.
- Schoenbaum, David Hitler's Social Revolution; Class and Status in Nazi Germany, 1933–1939, Garden City, N.Y. Doubleday, 1966.
- Schoeps, Karl-Heinz. Literature and Film in the Third Reich. Rochester: Camden House, 2004
- Schulte-Sasse, Linda. Entertaining the Third Reich: Illusions of Wholeness in Nazi Cinema. Durham, N.C.: Duke University Press, 1996.
- Schumann, Willy. Being Present: Growing up in Hitler's Germany. Kent, OH: Kent State University Press, 1991.
- Semmens, Kristin. Seeing Hitler's Germany: Tourism in the Third Reich. New York: Palgrave Macmillan, 2005.
- Smelser, Ronald; Davies, Edward J. The Myth of the Eastern Front: The Nazi-Soviet War in American Popular Culture. New York: Cambridge University Press, 2008.
- Speier, Hans. From the Ashes of Disgrace: A Journal from Germany, 1945–1955. Amherst: Univ. of Massachusetts Press, 1981.
- Stargardt, Nicholas. Witnesses of War: Children's Lives under the Nazis. New York: Knopf, 2006.
- Steigman-Gall, Richard. The Holy Reich: Nazi Conceptions of Christianity, 1919–1945. New York & London: Cambridge University Press, 2003.
- Stein, Leo. Hitler Came for Niemoeller: The Nazi War against Religion. Gretna, La.: Pelican Publishing, 2003.
- Steinacher, Gerald. Nazis on the Run: How Hitler's Henchmen Fled Justice. New York: Oxford University Press, 2012.
- Steinert, Marlis G. Hitler's War and the Germans: Public Mood and Attitude during the Second World War. Edited. and trans. by Thomas E. J. de Witt. Athens: Ohio University Press, 1977.
- Steinweis, Alan. Art, Ideology, & Economics in Nazi Germany: The Reich Chambers of Music, Theater, and the Visual Arts. Chapel Hill, North Carolina: University of North Carolina Press, 1993.
- Stephenson, Jill. Women in Nazi Germany. Harlow, England: Longman, 2001.
- Stern, Frank. The Whitewashing of the Yellow Badge: Antisemitism and Philosemitism in Postwar Germany. New York: Oxford University Press, 1992.
- Stern, Fritz. Five Germanys I Have Known. New York: Farrar, Straus and Giroux, 2007.
- Stern, Fritz. Dreams and Delusions: National Socialism in the Drama of the German Past. New York: Vintage Press, 1987.
- Stern, Kenneth. Holocaust Denial. New York: American Jewish Committee, 1993.
- Stibbe, Matthew. Women in the Third Reich,. Huntington Beach, CA: Arnold Publications, 2003.
- Stürmer, Michael. Dissonanzen des Fortschritts: Essays über Geschichte und Politik in Deutschland. München & Zurich: Piper Verlag, 1986.
- Sünker, Heinz, and Hans-Uwe Otto. Education and Fascism: Political Identity and Social Education in Nazi Germany. Knowledge, Identity and School Life Series, vol. 6. London: Falmer Press, 1997.
- Szölliösi-Janze, Margit, ed. Science in the Third Reich. Oxford: Berg Publishers, 2001.
- Tauber, Kurt P. Beyond Eagle and Swastika: German Nationalism Since 1945. Middletown, Conn.: Wesleyan Univ. Press, 1967.
- Taylor, Brandon, and Wilfried van der Will. The Nazification of Art: Art, Design, Music, Architecture, and Film in the Third Reich. Winchester: Winchester Press, Winchester School of Art, 1990.
- Taylor, Frederick. Exorcising Hitler: The Occupation and Denazification of Germany. New York & Berlin: Bloomsbury Press, 2013.
- Thomas, Katherine. Women in Nazi Germany. New York: AMS Press, 1981.
- Trentmann, Frank. Out of the Darkness: The Germans, 1942–2022. First edition. New York: Alfred A. Knopf, 2023.
- Wachsmann, Nikolaus. Hitler's Prisons: Legal Terror in Nazi Germany. New Haven, CT: Yale University Press, 2004.
- Walker, Lawrence D. Hitler Youth and Catholic Youth, 1933–1936. A Study in Totalitarian Conquest. Washington DC: Catholic University Press, 1970.
- Walker, Mark. German National Socialism and the Quest for Nuclear Power, 1939–1949. Cambridge: Cambridge University Press, 1989.
- Weinreich, Max. Hitler's Professors: The Part of Scholarship in Germany's Crimes against the Jewish People. New York: Yivo Press, 1946.
- Weinstein, Fred. The Dynamics of Nazism. Leadership, Ideology and the Holocaust. New York: Academic Press, 1980.
- Welch, David. Propaganda and the German Cinema, 1933–1945. Oxford: Clarendon Press; New York: Oxford University Press, 1983.
- Welch, David. The Third Reich: Politics and Propaganda. New York: Routledge, 1993.
- Wiesenthal, Simon. The Murderers Among Us. Paris: Opera Mundi, 1967.
- Winkel, Roel Vande, and David Welch, eds. Cinema and the Swastika: The International Expansion of Third Reich Cinema. New York: Palgrave Macmillan, 2007.
- Young, James. The Texture of Memory: Holocaust Memorials and Meaning. New Haven, CT: Yale University Press, 1993.
- Zabel, James A. Nazism and the Pastors. A Study of the Ideas of Three Deutsche Christen Groups. Missoula, MT: Scholars Press, 1976.
- Zahn, Gordon. German Catholics and Hitler's Wars. New York: Sheed and Ward, 1969.
- Zayas, Alfred-Maurice de. A Terrible Revenge: The Ethnic Cleansing of the East European Germans. 2nd ed. New York: Palgrave Macmillan, 2006.
- Zeman, Z. A. B. Nazi Propaganda. New York: Oxford University Press, 1973.
- Zortman, Bruce. Hitler's Theater: Ideological Drama in Nazi Germany. El Paso, Tex.: Firestein Books, 1984.
- Zuroff, Efraim. Occupation: Nazi-Hunter: The Continuing Search for the Perpetrators of the Holocaust. Hoboken, NJ: KTAV, 1994.

== See also ==
- List of books by or about Adolf Hitler
- Nazi Germany
- Adolf Hitler's rise to power
- Early timeline of Nazism
- Political views of Adolf Hitler
- Nazism
- Bibliography of World War II
