= Jürgen Förster =

German historian

- Born: 1940 (age 85–86); Germany
- Occupations: Historian, author, editor

Academic background
- Education: University of Cologne

Academic work
- Era: 20th century
- Institutions: Military History Research Office (MGFA); University of Freiburg
- Main interests: Modern European history, military history, historiography
- Notable works: Books on the history of Nazi Germany, including Germany and the Second World War

Jürgen Förster (born 1940) is a German historian who specialises in the history of Nazi Germany and World War II. He is a professor of history at the University of Freiburg, the position he has held since 2005. Förster is a contributor to the seminal work Germany and the Second World War from the Military History Research Office (MGFA).

== Education and career ==
After military service in the Bundeswehr, he studied history and English Studies at the University of Cologne and the University of Nottingham. He earned his PhD in history in 1974 under Andreas Hillgruber at Cologne. From 1970 to 2000, Förster worked as a researcher at the Military History Research Office (MGFA). In his academic career, Förster had teaching assignments at the University of Freiburg and University of Berlin and had several guest professorships, including at the Arizona State University, the Ohio State University, the Hebrew University of Jerusalem, the University of Glasgow, the University of Melbourne and Flinders University. Since 2005, Förster has been a lecturer for military history at the Chair of Modern and Contemporary History at the University of Freiburg.

== Historian of Nazi Germany ==
Wegner is a widely published author and editor on the subjects of military history of Nazi Germany and the history of National Socialism. He is a member of the Advisory Editorial Board of the journal War in History. Förster is also one of the authors of the seminal work Germany and the Second World War from the Military History Research Office (MGFA) contributing to several volumes of the series.

== Works ==
=== In English ===
- Germany and the Second World War:
  - Vol. IV: The Attack on the Soviet Union, with Horst Boog, Joachim Hoffmann, Ernst Klink, Rolf-Dieter Müller and Gerd R. Ueberschär
  - Vol. IX/I: German Wartime Society 1939–1945: Politicization, Disintegration, and the Struggle for Survival, with Ralf Blank, Jörg Echternkamp, Karola Fings, Winfried Heinemann, Tobias Jersak, Armin Nolzen, and Christoph Rass
- Förster, Jürgen (1998). "Complicity or Entanglement? The Wehrmacht, the War and the Holocaust". In Berenbaum, Michael; Peck, Abraham (eds.). The Holocaust and History The Known, the Unknown, the Disputed and the Reexamined. Bloomington: Indiana University Press. pp. 266–283. ISBN 978-0-253-33374-2.
- Förster, Jürgen (2005). Russia War, Peace and Diplomacy. Weidenfeld & Nicolson.

=== In German ===
- Stalingrad: Risse im Bündnis 1942/43. Rombach, Freiburg im Breisgau 1975, ISBN 3-7930-0175-X.
- Der Angriff auf die Sowjetunion. Fischer, Frankfurt am Main 1991, ISBN 3-596-11008-4. With Horst Boog, Joachim Hoffmann, Ernst Klink, Rolf-Dieter Müller, Gerd R. Ueberschär.
- Stalingrad: Ereignis - Wirkung - Symbol. Im Auftrag des Militärgeschichtlichen Forschungsamtes, Piper, München u.a. 1992, ISBN 3-492-11618-3. As editor.
- Ausbildungsziel Judenmord? "Weltanschauliche Erziehung" von SS, Polizei und Waffen-SS im Rahmen der "Endlösung". Fischer, Frankfurt am Main 2003, ISBN 3-596-15016-7. With Jürgen Matthäus, Richard Breitman, Konrad Kwiet.
- Die Wehrmacht im NS-Staat. Eine strukturgeschichtliche Analyse. Oldenbourg, München 2007, ISBN 978-3-486-58098-3.
