= Ernst Klink =

German military historian

- Born: 5 December 1923; Dietenhausen, Germany
- Died: 1993 (aged 69–70)
- Occupations: Historian, author, editor
- Known for: Member of HIAG, a post-war Waffen-SS lobby group

Academic background
- Education: University of Tübingen

Academic work
- Institutions: Military History Research Office (MGFA)
- Main interests: Modern European history Military history
- Notable works: Germany and the Second World War

Ernst Klink (5 December 1923 – 1993) was a German military historian who specialised in Nazi Germany and World War II. He was a long-term employee at the Military History Research Office (MGFA). As a contributor to the seminal work Germany and the Second World War from MGFA, Klink was the first to identify the independent planning by the German Army High Command for Operation Barbarossa.

During Klink's career as a historian, he was a member of, and worked with the denialist Waffen-SS veteran lobby group HIAG. In recent assessments, some of Klink's work has been questioned due to his support for the ahistorical notions of the "clean Wehrmacht" and that the German attack on the Soviet Union had been "preventive".

== Education and career ==
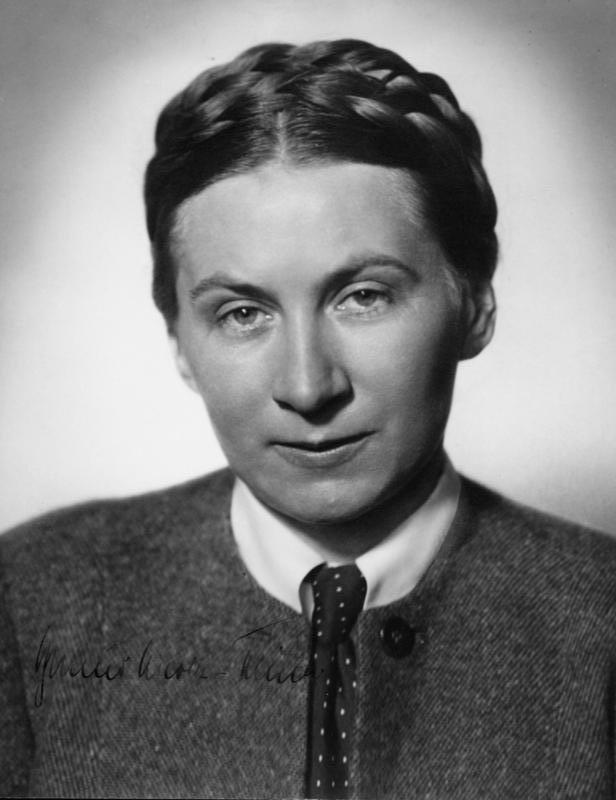
Gertrud Scholtz-Klink, Klink's mother, was head of the National Socialist Women's League.

Born in 1923, Ernst Klink grew up in Weimar and Nazi Germany; his mother was Gertrud Scholtz-Klink, head of the National Socialist Women's League. In 1941, Klink joined the SS and was commissioned to the SS Division Leibstandarte, fighting in Joachim Peiper's regiment against the Soviet Union Red Army. Reaching the rank of SS-Unterscharführer (sergeant), he participated in the Third Battle of Kharkov. He was so severely wounded on the first day of the Battle of Kursk that he was permanently disabled from military service.

After the war, Klink studied history, the German language, philosophy and the English language. He submitted his PhD thesis on the Åland Islands dispute 1917 to 1921 at the University of Tübingen in 1957. During the 1950s, Klink joined HIAG, a Waffen-SS veteran's association and lobby group, set up in West Germany in 1951 by former high-ranking Waffen-SS personnel. Klink joined the Military History Research Office (MGFA) at Freiburg in 1958. His tenure at MGFA was controversial, especially in recent assessments, due to his perceived sympathy to the myth of the "clean Wehrmacht".

== Activities within HIAG ==
In 1958, Klink became the spokesperson for the Tübingen branch of HIAG, a Waffen-SS lobby group and a revisionist veterans' organisation. Klink's tenure at MGFA was controversial, especially in recent assessments. According to Jens Westemeier in his biography of Joachim Peiper, Klink was "one of the most important lobbyists for the in-house historical falsification" by HIAG. He gave lectures at veterans' meetings, assisted with documentation, and in the words of the historian Jörg Echternkamp, "cultivated the image of the clean Wehrmacht".

Klink worked with HIAG and its in-house historian Walter Harzer to screen materials donated to the German Federal Military Archive in Freiburg for any information that may have implicated units and personnel in questionable activity. In the 1960s and 70s, Klink maintained a friendship with Peiper until the latter's death; the two spoke by telephone shortly before Peiper died in a fire on the night of 14 July 1976.

Klink was approached by HIAG to write Peiper's biography, but declined; he was unwilling to stake his academic reputation on an attempt to rehabilitate Peiper. Nonetheless, in 1990, Klink wrote an article sharply critical of the Malmedy massacre trial and favourable towards the Waffen-SS. According to the researcher Danny Parker, Klink "pretended to be a politically neutral historian at the MGFA", but his bias, especially towards the Waffen-SS, was obvious from the personal papers of Klink that Parker had examined.

== Military historian of Nazi Germany ==
Klink was a contributor to the fourth volume, The Attack on the Soviet Union, of Germany and the Second World War, produced by historians of the MGFA. The volume appeared in 1983 and focused on Operation Barbarossa, the 1941 invasion of the Soviet Union. In what the historian David Stahel describes as "groundbreaking research" that (as of 2009) was "unsurpassed", Klink was the first to provide a comprehensive account of the military planning for Barbarossa. Klink was also the first to identify the German Army's independent planning for an attack on the Soviet Union in the summer of 1940, known as Operation Otto. Stahel commends Klink on the operations study of the Battle of Smolensk, despite over-reliance on the files of the Oberkommando der Wehrmacht (OKW, "High Command of the Armed Forces") and the Oberkommando des Heeres (OKH, "High Command of the German Army"), which were at times at odds with diaries of the combat units and did not fully reflect the difficulties of the battle.

Klink's colleague at the MGFA, Gerd R. Ueberschär, remarks that Klink based his study solely upon military records and attempted to portray the operations as "apolitical". Ueberschär criticises Klink for portraying Hitler as an excellent military leader, contrasting his decisions favourably to the "poor decisions" by the Chief of General Staff Franz Halder. According to Ueberschär, other researchers denied this notion, and it is not supported by the available records. "Klink's narrow military view," Ueberschär writes, "also enticed him into sidling up to the long disproved Nazi claim that this was a preventive war".

== Works ==
=== In English ===
- Horst Boog, Joachim Hoffmann, Rolf-Dieter Müller and Gerd R. Ueberschär et al. Germany and the Second World War, Vol. IV: The Attack on the Soviet Union. Oxford University Press, 1998, ISBN 0-19-822886-4.

=== In German ===
- Das Gesetz des Handelns. Die Operation »Zitadelle« 1943, 1966, MGFA

== Bibliography ==
- Jörg Echternkamp (2015). "Die Bundeswehr, das Verteidigungsministerium und die Aufarbeitung der NS-Vergangenheit im Systemkonflikt [The Bundeswehr, the Ministry of Defense, and the revision of the Nazi past]" (in German). Potsdam: Zeitgeschichte-online.
- Müller, Rolf-Dieter; Ueberschär, Gerd R. (2002). Hitler's War in the East 1941–1945: A Critical Assessment (2nd rev. ed.). New York: Berghahn Books. ISBN 978-1-57181-293-3.
- Parker, Danny S. (2014). Hitler's Warrior: The Life and Wars of SS Colonel Jochen Peiper. Boston: Da Capo Press. ISBN 978-0-306-82154-7. Archived from the original on June 29, 2017.
- Stahel, David (2009). Operation Barbarossa and Germany's Defeat in the East. Cambridge, UK: Cambridge University Press. ISBN 978-0-521-76847-4.
- Westemeier, Jens (2014). Himmlers Krieger: Joachim Peiper und die Waffen-SS in Krieg und Nachkriegszeit (in German). Paderborn: Ferdinand Schöningh. ISBN 978-3-506-77241-1.
- Westemeier, Jens (2007). Joachim Peiper: A Biography of Himmler's SS Commander. Atglen, Pennsylvania: Schiffer Publishing. ISBN 978-0764326592.
