= German–Soviet economic relations (1934–1941) =

Economic relations between Nazi Germany and Soviet Union

Nazi Germany–Soviet Union (1933–1941) relations
- Germany: Soviet Union

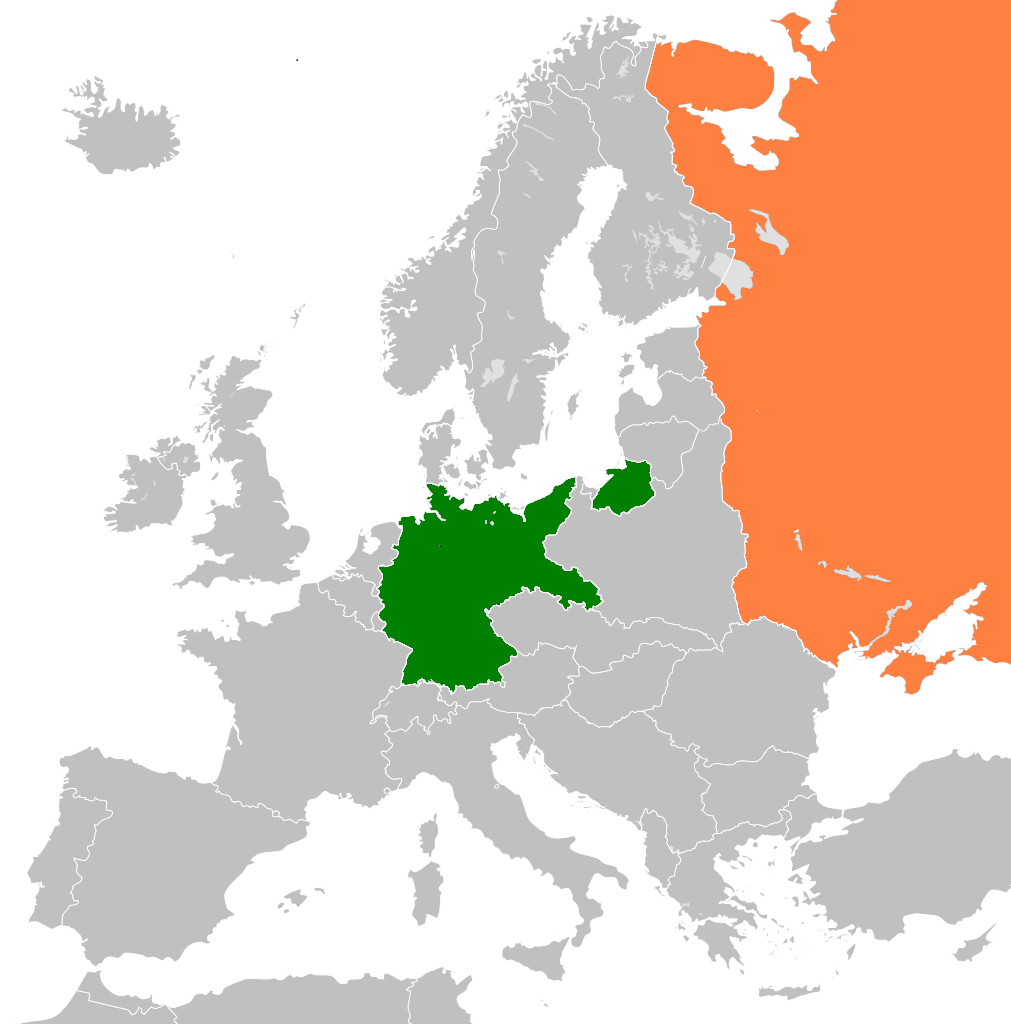
Territories of the Soviet Union and Nazi Germany until 1937

After the Nazis rose to power in Germany in 1933, relations between Nazi Germany and the Soviet Union began to deteriorate rapidly. Trade between the two sides decreased. Following several years of heightened tension and rivalry, the two totalitarian governments began to improve relations in 1939. In August of that year, the countries expanded their economic relationship by entering into a Trade and Credit agreement whereby the Soviet Union sent critical raw materials to Germany in exchange for weapons, military technology and civilian machinery. That deal accompanied the Molotov–Ribbentrop Pact, which contained secret protocols dividing central Europe between them, after which both Nazi forces and Soviet forces invaded territories listed within their "spheres of influence".

The countries later further expanded their economic relationship with a larger commercial agreement in February 1940. Thereafter, Germany received significant amounts of critical raw materials necessary for its future war efforts, such as petroleum, grain, rubber and manganese, while sending weapons, technology and manufacturing machinery to the Soviet Union. After unresolved negotiations regarding a potential Soviet entry into the Axis Pact, the two governments settled several disputes and further expanded their economic dealings with the January 1941 German–Soviet Border and Commercial Agreement.

Economic relations between the two countries were abruptly terminated when Germany invaded the Soviet Union in June 1941, in violation of the Molotov–Ribbentrop Pact.

== Background ==
=== Traditional commerce, World War I and Russian Revolution ===
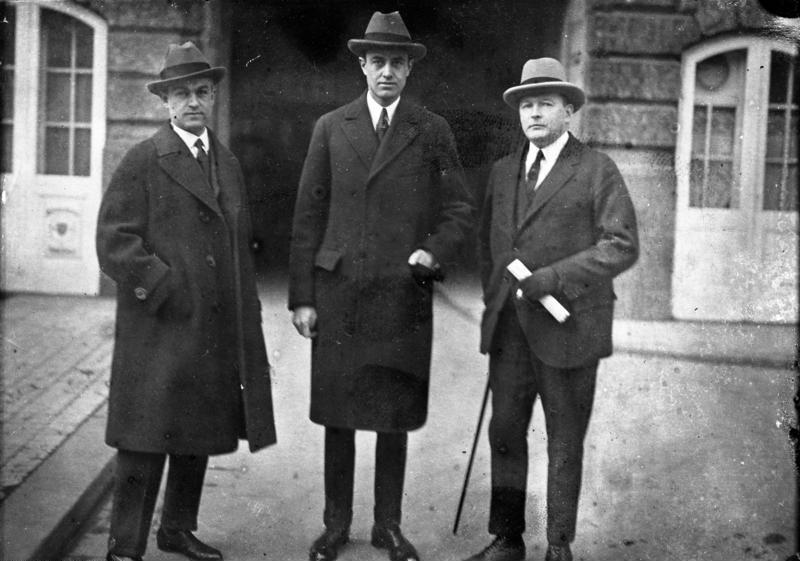
American businessmen (W. Averell Harriman in centre) in Berlin in 1925 to work with Germany to broker a deal for Soviet manganese ore

Germany did not lack natural resources, including the key raw materials needed for economic and military operations.

Before World War I, Germany had annually imported 1.5 billion Reichsmarks of raw materials and other goods from Russia. However, the economies of the two countries differed greatly before World War I. Germany had grown into the second-largest trading economy in the world, with a highly skilled workforce largely dominated by the private sector. While Imperial Russia had rapidly modernized by tenfold in the fifty years before the war, its economy still relied heavily upon state orders and its industry was closely regulated by the Tsarist state.

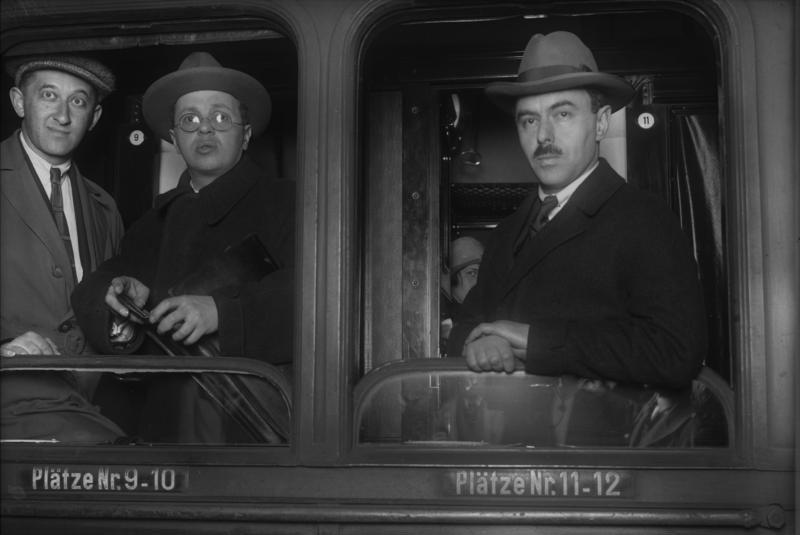
Soviet economic delegation in Berlin in 1927

Russian exports to Germany fell sharply after World War I. In addition, after the Russian Revolution of 1917, the young communist state assumed ownership of all heavy industry, banking and railways, while the 1921 New Economic Policy left almost all small-scale production and farming in the private sector. The war-ravaged German economy struggled to return to pre-war levels, with inflation also taking its toll in 1923.

In the Soviet Union, only by 1927 had industrial output achieved approximately the 1913 levels under the Tsarist regime, but Soviet exports to Germany increased to 433 million Reichsmarks annually by 1927 after trade agreements were signed between the two countries in the mid-1920s.

Economist Nikolai Kondratiev was asked to study the Soviet economy, and he advocated slow prudent growth that kept the residual market economy of the New Economic Policy. In the late 1920s, Joseph Stalin took the economy in the opposite direction, beginning a successful period of full-scale socialist industrialization in his first five-year plan for a Soviet economy that was still over 80% composed by the private sector, with plans to shed all vestiges of the free market. Kondratiev was accused of espousing a "counter-revolutionary" equilibrium theory, after which he was fired and jailed for being a "kulak-professor." Towards the end of his 8 year sentence he was put on trial again and executed at the Kommunarka shooting ground by firing squad on the same day his death sentence was issued.

=== Early 1930s ===
In the early 1930s, Soviet imports decreased as the Communist model achieved greater self sufficiency. The Soviet economic planning body improved greatly in spite of hostile foreign powers. What followed was a system which included the most adequate review of national accounts and economic measurements. The subsequent changes to Gosplan improved its operation.

Though Soviet industrial output had significantly increased over its prior levels, Soviet exports to Germany fell to 223 million Reichsmarks in 1934 due to the Soviets distrust of the German regime. Although the Soviet Union possessed almost double the population of Germany, its industrial output still lagged behind because of the backward nature of the former Tsarist regime and invasions of the Soviet Union by the Western powers and others that followed its inception. Its steel production almost caught up with Germany's in 1933 during the German economic collapse in the Great Depression. Following are German imports from Imperial Russia and the Soviet Union from 1912 to 1933:

Year	Imports from Russia/USSR*	Year	Imports from Russia/USSR*
1912	1,528	1928	379
1913	1,425	1929	426
1923	147	1930	436
1924	141	1931	304
1925	230	1932	271
1926	323	1933	194
1927	433		
*millions of Reichsmarks

Soviet exports into Germany were a small percentage of Germany's imports due to the large amount of trade the Nazi regime carried out with the USA and the UK. At the time, the Soviets had little of interest to foreign buyers in general.

== Nazi era and relations deterioration ==
=== Nazis rise to power ===
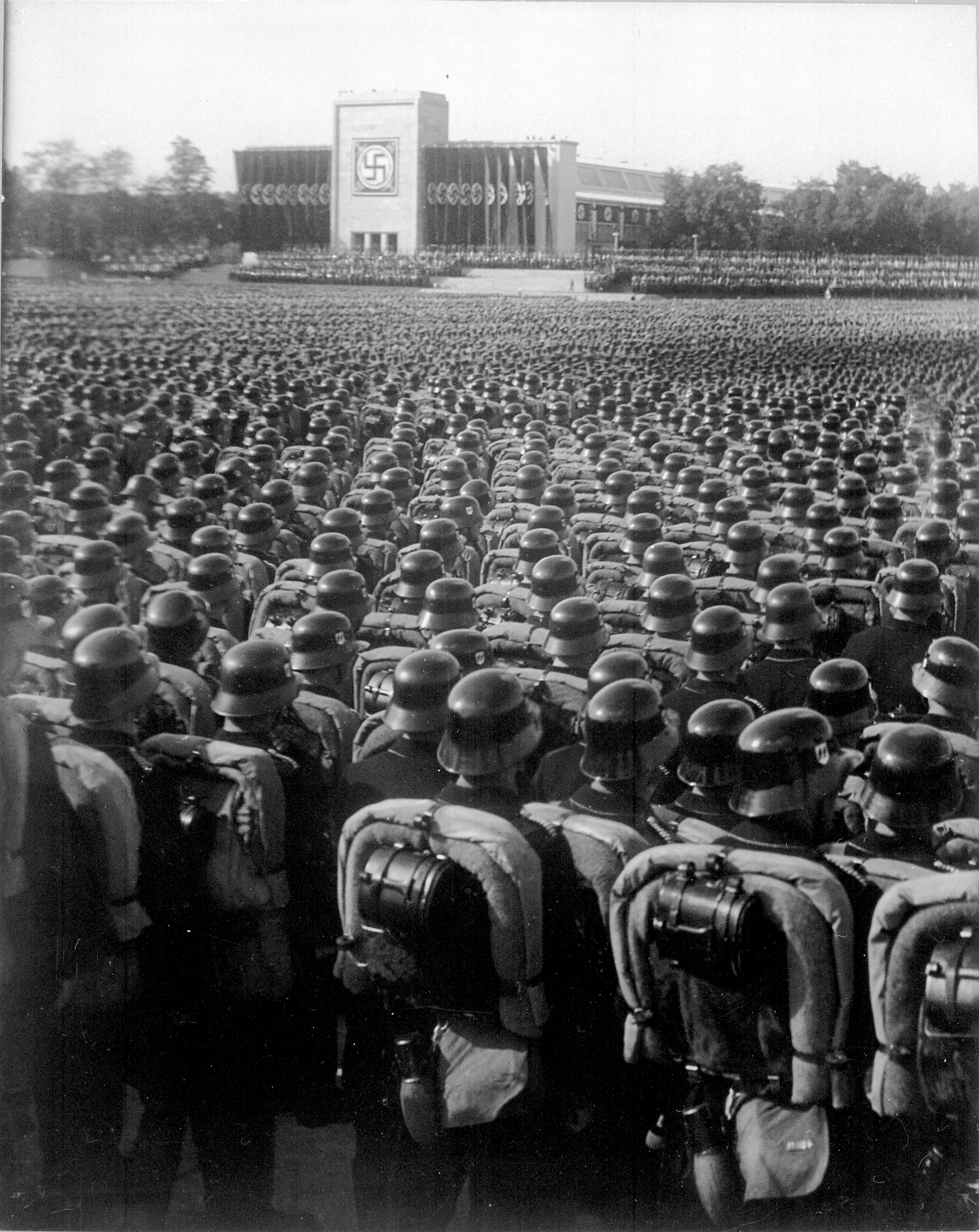
March at Reichsparteitag 1935.

The rise to power of the Nazi Party increased tensions between Germany and the Soviet Union, with Nazi racial ideology casting the Soviet Union as populated by ethnic Slav "untermenschen" ruled by their "Jewish Bolshevik" masters. In 1934, Hitler spoke of an inescapable battle against "pan-Slav ideals", the victory in which would lead to "permanent mastery of the world", though he stated that they would "walk part of the road with the Russians, if that will help us." The sentiment roughly echoed Hitler's 1925 Mein Kampf writings, in which he stated that Germany's destiny was to turn "to the East" as it did "six hundred years ago" and "the end of the Jewish domination in Russia will also be the end of Russia as a State."

According to Joseph Stalin’s interpreter, Valentin Berezhkov, Stalin spoke highly of the Night of the Long Knives in 1934 and viewed Hitler as a “great man!” who had demonstrated “the way to deal with your political opponents”. Berezhkov also suggested parallels between Hitler’s inner party purge and Stalin's mass repressions of Old Bolsheviks, military commanders and intellectuals.

Nazi ideology focused on a racial struggle, rather than the class struggle at the center of Marxist ideology. While Nazi ideology opposed both the communism of the Soviet Union and capitalism, associating Jews with both systems, Nazi criticism of capitalism shared similarities with that of Marxists in that they both focused upon excessive financial concentration, declining exports, shrinking markets and overproduction. Hitler later boasted that the best means to beat inflation "was to be sought for in our concentration camps." While Marxists saw revolution as the solution, Hitler saw the only solution as conquest—expropriating the resources, such as Lebensraum, through war that could not be won through failing capitalist systems. However, survival of the private sector was not incompatible with extensive Nazi state economic planning.

Both the Soviet and German economies had grown coming out of dire economic slumps in the late 1920s following World War I and the Russian Revolution. The German economy experienced real growth of over 70% between 1933 and 1938, while the Soviet economy experienced roughly the same growth between 1928 and 1938. However, with heavy state intervention, both economies also became more isolated and expanded under conditions of exceptional autarky. Outside trade and outside capital investment declined considerably for both economies during the 1930s.

In the mid-1930s, the Soviet Union made repeated efforts to reestablish closer contacts with Germany. The Soviets chiefly sought to repay debts from earlier trade with raw materials, while Germany sought to rearm, and the countries signed a credit agreement in 1935. In 1936, the Soviets attempted to seek closer political ties to Germany along with an additional credit agreement, which were rebuffed by Hitler, who wished to steer clear of such political ties. In response to Stalin's hopes to complete an economic deal with Hitler, the foreign section of the NKVD warned him that "all Soviet attempts to appease and conciliate Hitler are doomed. The main obstacle to an understanding with Moscow is Hitler himself." Stalin did not agree, responding to the NKVD "Well, now, how can Hitler make war on us when he has granted such loans? It's impossible. The business circles in Germany are too powerful, and they are in the saddle."

=== Mid-1930s deterioration of relations ===
In 1936, Germany and Fascist Italy supported the Spanish Nationalists in the Spanish Civil War, while the Soviets supported the partially socialist-led Spanish Republic opposition. That same year, Germany and Japan entered the Anti-Comintern Pact, and were joined a year later by Italy.

That year, Germany also faced a large food and raw material crisis that had developed out of the increasing difficulties state bodies experienced attempting to control prices and commodity supplies in the face of resistant market forces. Much like Soviet economist Nikolai Kondratiev, lead German economist Hjalmar Schacht was fired and castigated. The crisis resulted in Hitler writing one of the few documents of any length that he drafted in his 12 years as Reich leader—a six-page memorandum that focused upon building a military larger than all possible enemy combinations and forcing upon the economy its racial duty of eschewing all inessential tasks in favor of large-scale war making. From this came Hitler's Four Year Plan for rearmament "without regard to costs", transforming the economy into a Wehrwirtschaft (defense-based economy). His advisers had suggested a Five Year Plan, but Hitler declined in favor of the less Marxist sounding Four Year Plan.

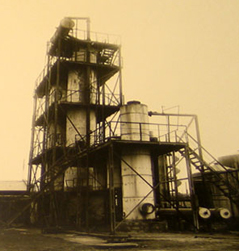
Soviet oil refinery, 1934

Soviet industrialization of the early 1930s required massive debt expansions. To attempt to decrease this debt, grain was sold in large quantities in world markets. German debt also soared with increased state spending. Both countries turned more to economic isolation and autarky. Germany brazenly refused to pay interest on its bonds, and then secretly directed third parties working for it to buy back those subsequently devalued bonds at rock bottom prices. As a result, only 15% of German debt was held by foreign sources in the late 1930s.

The Soviet great purges in 1937 and 1938 made striking an agreement with Germany even less likely by disrupting the already confused Soviet administrative structure necessary for negotiations. In the portion of the purges involving the military in 1936 and 1937, over 34,000 officers were purged in a campaign against a "fascist-Trotskyite conspiracy", including 45% of the most senior officers. While many officers were later reinstated, those that were convicted were shot and political officers, 73 per cent of whom had no military experience, were introduced into the Red Army. The purges led Hitler to believe that the Soviets were militarily weak. Castigated former lead economist Kondratiev was one of those executed in the purges. His harangued German economist counterpart, Schacht, would face similar treatment many years later, being sent to a Nazi concentration camp after being accused of being part of the July 20 Plot to assassinate Hitler.

Economic reconciliation was hampered even further by political tension after the Anschluss in mid-1938 and Hitler's increasing reluctance to deal with the Soviet Union. Soviet exports to Germany fell to 47.4 million Reichsmarks in 1937 (approximately one fifth of the 1934 total) and 52.8 million Reichsmarks in 1938. In short, the important trading relationship between the countries that existed in the 1920s essentially collapsed with Hitler's rise to power. German northeastern European imports from 1934 to 1939 were as follows:

	Soviet Union	Poland and Danzig	Finland	Estonia	Latvia	Lithuania
1934	223.0	78.1	42.3	8.2	21.1	15.1
1935	201.7	75.5	41.4	13.0	31.1	2.0
1936	93.2	74.0	46.1	13.8	33.2	9.1
1937	63.1	80.7	70.1	23.7	45.7	17.2
1938	47.4	109.4	88.6	24.0	43.5	27.6
1939	52.8	140.8	88.9	24.3	43.6	27.8
*German Imports in millions of Reichsmarks

Even with vastly decreased trade between the countries, Germany was still among the top three importer nations for the Soviet Union and supplied between one third and two thirds of Soviet machine tool imports vital for industrialization. Trade continued on the basis of short term clearing agreements. Germany had supplied 54% of Soviet imports of machine tools from 1929 to 1933, and 53% of such imports even when relations became more tense from 1933 to 1937.

=== Four and Five Year Plans ===
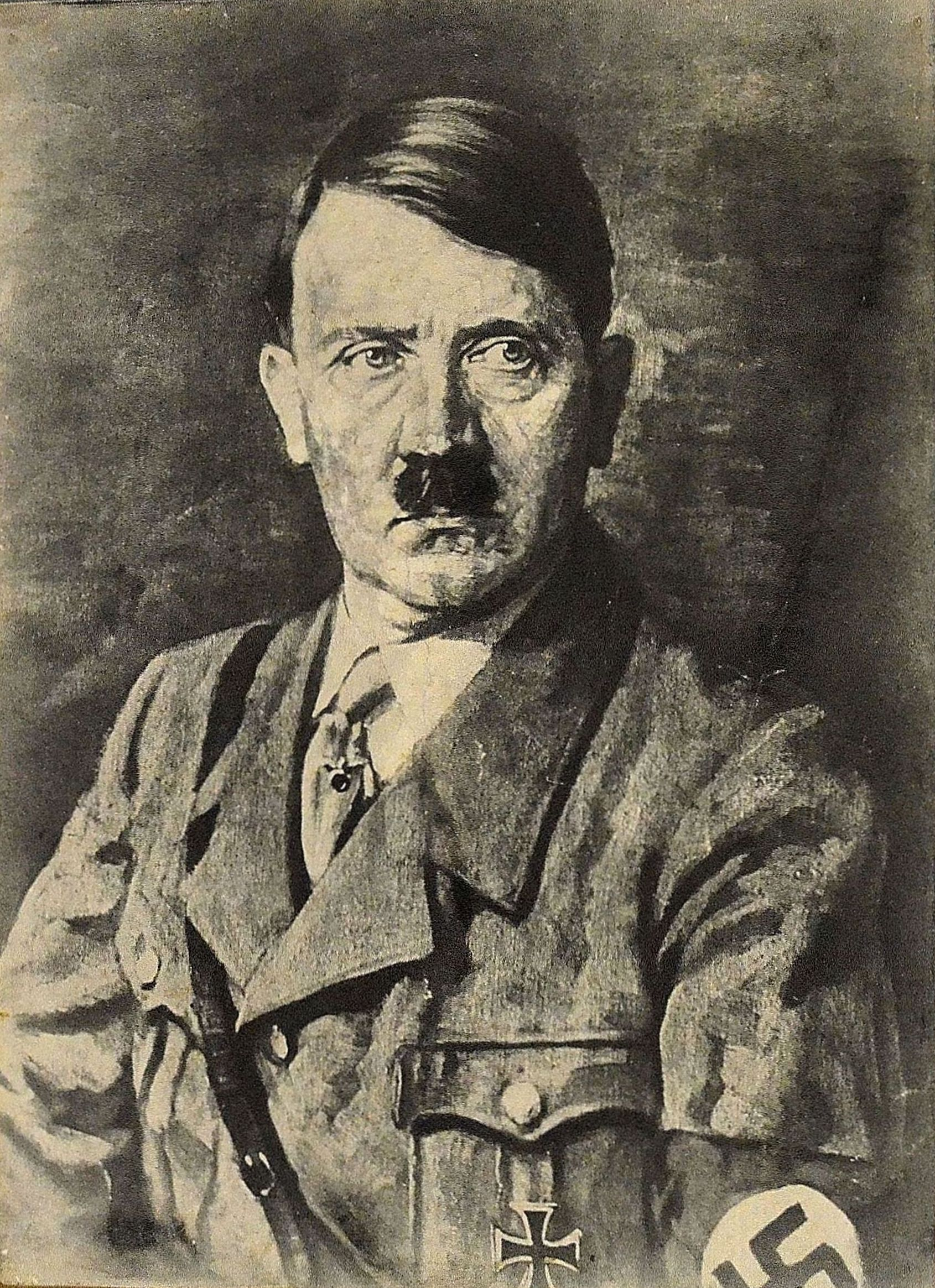
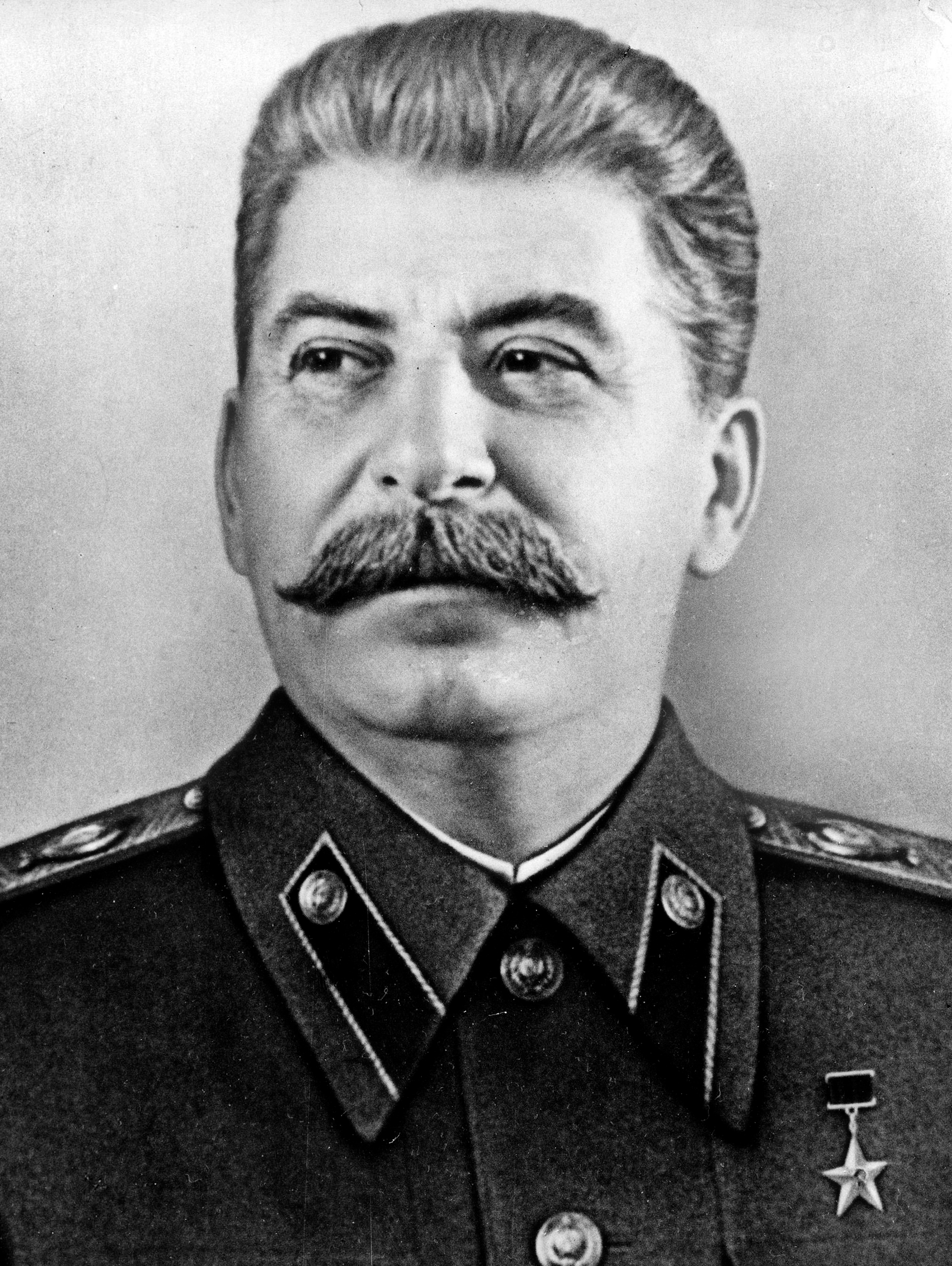
Both Authoritarian and Totalitarian leaders Adolf Hitler (left), and Joseph Stalin (right), respectively emerged from comparison of Hitler and Stalin ("H" and "S") as an exemplary cases of the mix of authoritarianism and totalitarianism.

Both the German Four Year Plan and Soviet Second and Third Five Year Plans emphasized the construction of military installations, factories, canals, roads and cities that produced accumulating crises of over-investment and supply failures in other non-emphasized economic areas. Monopsony compromised both systems, with the Soviet state the principal purchaser for all goods in its economy, while the German state was the largest purchaser in its economy. German cost-plus contracts and Soviet fraud and mismanagement caused inefficient contracting, resulting in the building of massive contract-monitoring bureaucratic structures that produced additional costs in both economies.

In March 1939, the Soviet Union announced the new directives of the Third Five Year Plan, named "Five Year Plan of Special Steels and Chemicals." The defense sector received the highest priority under the plan. The pressure to fulfill Soviet Second and Third Five Year Plan goals was more keen where managers faced the risk that every failure might be interpreted as an act of economic sabotage. In 1936, the head of the Soviet Gosbank was shot after he suggested a relaxation of economic controls. To cope with state controls of supply systems, blat (informal black market) agreements were often made, which could not easily be tracked by Gosplan.

Hitler's Four Year Plan called for a modernized expanded agricultural sector to free Germany from the fear of a blockade, a network of motorways, remodeled cities, a massive program of import-substitution to supply synthetic strategic material and military industries capable of out-producing the largest enemy economy. The plan required a rigid structure of six main economic divisions: raw materials production, raw materials distribution, labor agriculture, price control and foreign exchange. It made heavy demands on resources already in short supply because of high military spending, resulting in the delay or postponement of most programs while scrambling for raw materials, building workers and engineering equipment. Pseudo markets were created to attempt to make the system work more efficiently. In response to blat-like commerce arising, Germany passed laws labeling such unsanctioned commerce as "economic sabotage" punishable by death. German regulation of private property and capital movement hardened, and property could be seized from political enemies such as ethnic Jews or communists.

=== Huge German and Soviet military demand growth ===
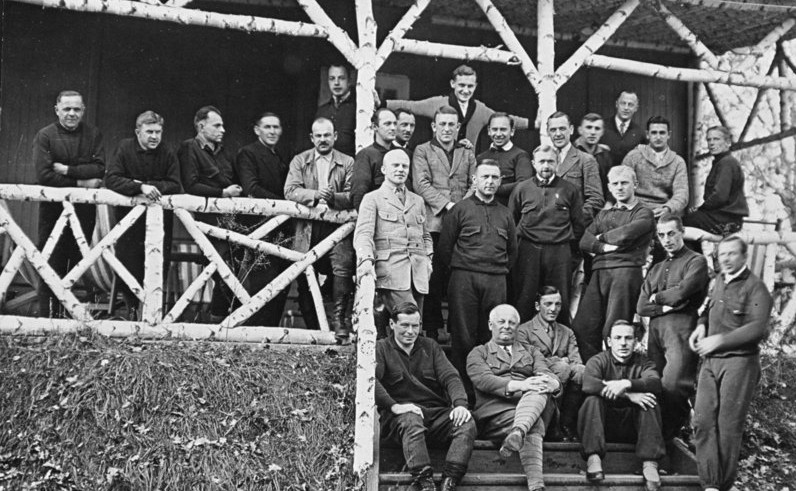
German staff at Tomka chemical weapons facility, Soviet Union, 1928

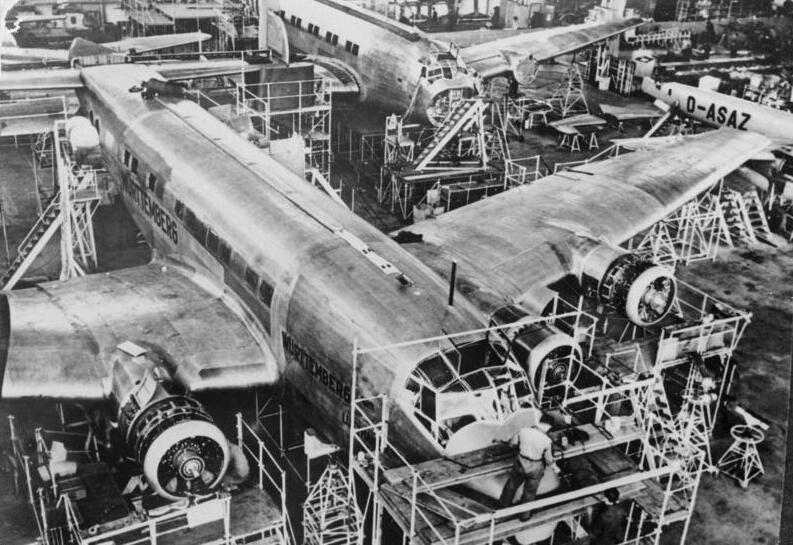
Production of German Ju 90 airliners developed for and used by Deutsche Lufthansa, 1938

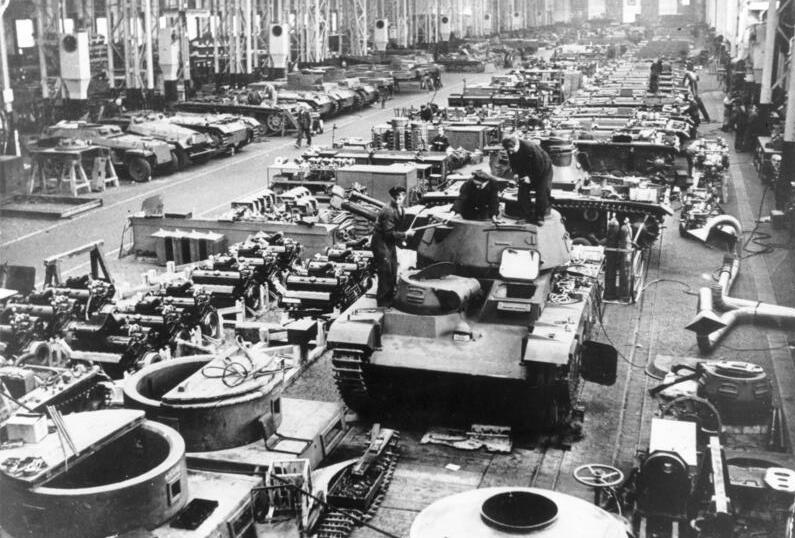
German Neubaufahrzeug production, 1940

German and Soviet demand for military supplies, already the subject of massive growth under their Four and Five Year Plans, increased even further after the Munich Agreement. While both Stalin and Hitler had long spoken of an over-riding necessity to prepare for war, Hitler's outlook was for an offensive war, comporting with Nazi ideology, by a new community of Germans carving an empire across Europe, slaying the "Jewish Bolshevik" dragon and addressing punitive Treaty of Versailles provisions.

The Treaty of Versailles restrictions had resulted in a very weak German military as late as the early 1930s, though planning efforts had been underway since the late 1920s for military growth in preparation for the next European war. German military spending remained restrained during this period: (Note: Nominal defense spending figures are from Overy (2004, p. 453), who notes that "Soviet budget figure do not reflect the high level of inflation. Calculated in price of 1937 the figure for 192.8 is 1.7 billion, that for 1937 17.0 billion and in 1940 45.2. billion. There was price deflation in Germany between 192.9 and 1936, so the expenditure figure in those years are higher in real terms." German inflation-deflation indices were from Child (1978). Soviet price inflation indices were from Lewis (2003).)

	German Defense (Bil. RM)	Soviet Defence (Bil. Rbls)	German Defense Inflation Adj*	Soviet Defense Inflation Adj*
1928	0.75	0.88	NA	NA
1929	0.69	1.05	0.69	1.05
1930	0.67	1.20	0.73	1.12
1931	0.61	1.79	0.75	1.43
1932	0.69	1.05	0.98	0.70
*Inflation adj. uses Wholesale Price Indices (1929 base) - Note: German deflation

To get around Versailles restrictions, Germany and the Soviet Union collaborated to allow Germany to establish experimental centers in the Soviet Union for tank, chemical weapons and aviation research, while Soviet officers traveled to Germany for military instruction. However, this secret collaboration ended with Hitler's rise to the Chancellery in 1933. Immediately thereafter, Hitler ordered a tripling of German military size in one year. Germany instituted covert military increases, including ship production in excess of Versailles limits, while refusing to ever refer to its "General Staff" (which was prohibited by Versailles) and ceasing publication of its officer list. On March 16, 1935, Hitler surprised world powers by passing a law openly requiring universal military service and further increasing military size to half a million men. Countries including France and Britain protested, but did not act, effectively ending the pretense of military restrictions under Versailles.

By 1939, three years into the Four Year Plan, over 20% of all German industrial workers worked for the armed forces, while nearly 33% of those in the manufacturing and building sectors worked there. By comparison, in 1938, Britain and the United States produced just 13% of the quantity of weapons that Germany produced that year. German armament spending went from under 2% of gross national product in 1933 to over 23% in 1939. German armament expenses under the Nazi regime increased rapidly, especially under the Four Year plan:

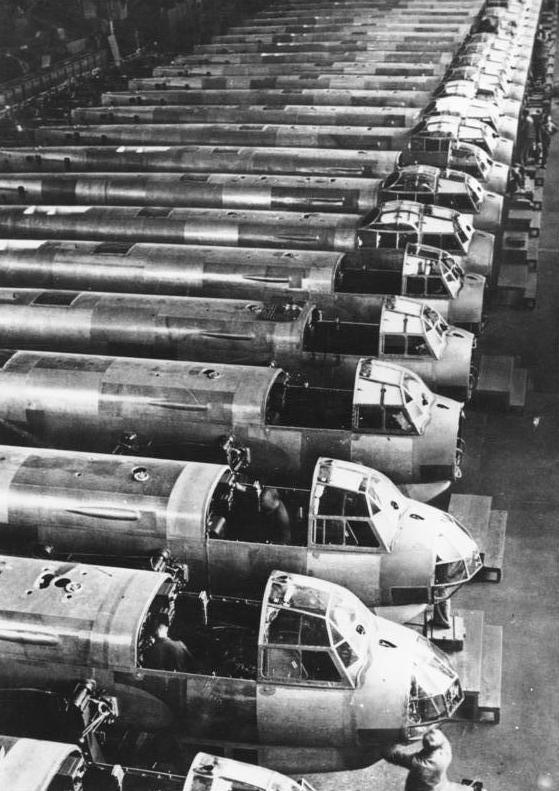
Ju 88 assembly line

	German Defense (Bil. RM)	Soviet Defence (Bil. Rbls)	German Defense Inflation Adj*	Soviet Defense Inflation Adj*
1933	0.62	4.03	0.91	2.46
1934	4.09	5.40	5.7	2.82
1935	5.49	8.20	7.40	3.39
1936	10.27	14.80	13.53	5.05
1937	10.96	17.48	14.19	5.54
1938	17.25	22.37	27.04	7.66
1939	38.00	40.88	38.6	10.25
*Inflation adj. uses Wholesale Price Indices (1929 base) - Note: German deflation

Stalin viewed a coming war as occurring between imperialist powers, and in the late 1920s, had even predicted a massive war between the United States and Britain. The Soviet military experienced almost proportionately identical massive increases nominally as that of Germany for military equipment and weapon designs to strengthen a Red Army and Red Navy weakened by purges. While in the face of massive Soviet inflation in the 1930s, military spending increases were still enormous, the differences grow considerably when adjusted for inflation (Germany actually experienced deflation). From 1931 to 1934, the Soviet had purposefully published figures for military spending below actual levels. Because of League of Nations publications requirements, the Soviets began more accurate defense spending publications by 1936.

The Soviet Third Five Year Plan required massive new infusions of technology and industrial equipment. After Stalin's shock at the poor performance of Soviet aircraft in the Spanish Civil War and the "backwardness" of the Soviet Air Force in 1938, emphasis was put on military production, including that of large naval ships. By 1937, 17% of Soviet gross national product was spent on defense, while over 20% of industrial investment went to defense industries. At the same time, military personnel increased from 562,000 in 1931 to just over 1.5 million in 1938. Meanwhile, the Soviet transportation network was woefully underdeveloped, with roads approaching non-existence and rail lines already stretched to their limits.

The ambitious objectives of the Third Five Year Plan hinged upon the Soviet economy's importing large amounts of technology from the United States, which then supplied over 60% of Soviet machines and equipment.

=== Late 1930s German raw materials crunch ===
By the late 1930s, foreign trade became difficult because Germany lacked the gold or foreign exchange needed to finance any balance of payment deficit. Further damaging foreign trade, Germany had already heavily regulated exports and imports, requiring licenses and approval for all trades so that it could favor the raw materials imports that it desperately need. Additional trading difficulties were caused by a boycott of German goods following Kristallnacht in November 1938.

Because an autarkic economic approach or an alliance with Britain were impossible, Germany needed to arrange closer relations with the Soviet Union, if not just for economic reasons alone. Despite work on coal hydrogenisation, Germany lacked oil and could only supply 25% of its own needs. Since its main supplier, the United States, would be potentially cut off during a war, Germany had to look to Soviet Union and Romania. Germany suffered from the same supply problems for metal ores such as chrome, tungsten, nickel, molybdenum, and manganese, all of which were needed for hardened steel used in tanks, ships and other war equipment. For example, Germany was almost 100% reliant on imports for chrome, and the loss of South African and Turkish imports alone were a blockade to arise would eliminate 80% of imports. Even for manganese, of which Germany supplied 40% of its needs, the expected British blockade would cut its link to its main outside supplier, South Africa. Germany was 35% self-sufficient for iron ore, but would lose 36% of its previous imported supply on the outbreak of war. Furthermore, Stalin's permission was needed to transit tungsten and molybdenum from China, which required Soviet-controlled rail lines. Meanwhile, the Soviet Union was the world's largest source of manganese, the second largest for chrome and platinum and the third largest supplier of crude oil, iron ore and nickel.

Rubber was particularly troublesome, with Germany requiring 80% of its rubber from imports. Hitler required Soviet help to procure rubber from the Far East, the shortage of which had caused Germany problems in World War I. Rubber production in Malaya and the East Indies was dominated by the British and the Dutch. Cutting off these sources would leave Germany with stockpiles for only two months. Although German synthetic materials plants could produce 50% of German rubber needs, Germany still required large amounts of natural rubber as raw material. And just to achieve that synthetic production, Germany had invested a massive 1.9 billion Reichsmarks over three years—almost half of all investment in its capital goods industry.

While Germany had decreased its dependence on imported food from 35% in 1927 to 13% in 1939, 40% of its fat and oil food requirements had to be met by imports. Moreover, Germany's food requirements would grow further if it conquered nations that were also net food importers. Soviet imports of Ukrainian grains or Soviet trans-shipments of Manchurian soybeans could make up the shortfall.

In 1936, Hermann Göring told several German industrialists that "obtaining raw materials from Soviet Union is so important that he shall raise this issue with Hitler himself—however much the latter might be ill-disposed to accept this." By 1937, the vast gulf between raw material needs and supplies had taken over Hitler's thinking for conquest. German military industry desperately needed certain raw materials, such as manganese ore and petroleum, and these could be purchased on a regular basis only from the Soviet Union. Goering had stated that Germany desired business ties with the Soviets "at any cost."

After hearing the dire reports of German planners, in a November 5, 1937, Hitler told his generals that he would have to take over a neighbouring country to ensure the supply of agricultural land and raw materials, now equating this massive economic need with Lebensraum. The German Anschluss and German occupation of Czechoslovakia were driven by economic as much as racial motives, with heavy industry in those locations being absorbed by the Reichswehr rather than private industry. The day German forces entered the Czech Sudetenland, Hermann Göring pored over figures with generals covering every item of Sudeten economic resources, from lignite to margarine, so that it could be allocated to the Four Year Plan. In January 1939, the huge Four Year Plan goals combined with a shortage of foreign hard currencies needed to pay for raw materials forced Hitler to order major defense cuts, including a reduction by the Wehrmacht of its allocations by 30% of steel, 47% of aluminum, 25% of cement, 14% of rubber and 20% of copper. On January 30, 1939, Hitler made his "Export or die" speech calling for a German economic offensive ("export battle", to use Hitler's term), to increase German foreign exchange holdings to pay for raw materials such as high-grade iron needed for military materials.

== Early 1939 deal discussions ==
=== Early discussions ===
Germany and the Soviet Union discussed entering into an economic deal throughout early 1939. During spring and summer 1939, the Soviets negotiated a political and military pact with France and Britain, while at the same time talking with German officials about a potential political Soviet–German agreement. Through economic discussion in April and May, Germany and the Soviet Union hinted of discussing a political agreement.

Ensuing political discussions between the countries were channeled through the economic negotiation, because the economic needs of the two sides were substantial and because close military and diplomatic connections had been severed in the mid-1930s after the creation of the Anti-Comintern Pact and the Spanish Civil War, leaving these talks as the only means of communication. German planners in April and May 1939 feared massive oil, food, rubber and metal ore shortages without Soviet help in the event of a war.

=== Addressing past hostilities and finalizing the deals ===
In late July and early August, the Soviet Union and Germany were very close to finalizing the terms of a proposed economic deal and began to more concretely discuss the possibility of a political deal, which the Soviets insisted could only follow after an economic deal was reached. They discussed prior hostilities between the countries in the 1930s and addressed their common ground of anti-capitalism, stating "there is one common element in the ideology of Germany, Italy and the Soviet Union: opposition to the capitalist democracies," "neither we nor Italy have anything in common with the capitalist west" and "it seems to us rather unnatural that a socialist state would stand on the side of the western democracies." The Germans explained that their prior hostility toward Soviet Bolshevism had subsided with the changes in the Comintern and the Soviet renunciation of a world revolution. The Soviet official at the meeting characterized the conversation as "extremely important."

As Germany scheduled its invasion of Poland for August 25 and prepared for war with France, German war planners in August estimated that, because of massive oil, food and rubber shortfalls, in the face of an expected British blockade, the Soviet Union would become the only supplier for many items. Every internal German military and economic study had argued that Germany was doomed to defeat without at least Soviet neutrality. By August 10, the countries worked out the last minor technical details, but the Soviets delayed signing the economic agreement for almost ten days until they were sure that they had also reached a political agreement.

== 1939 economic and political deals ==
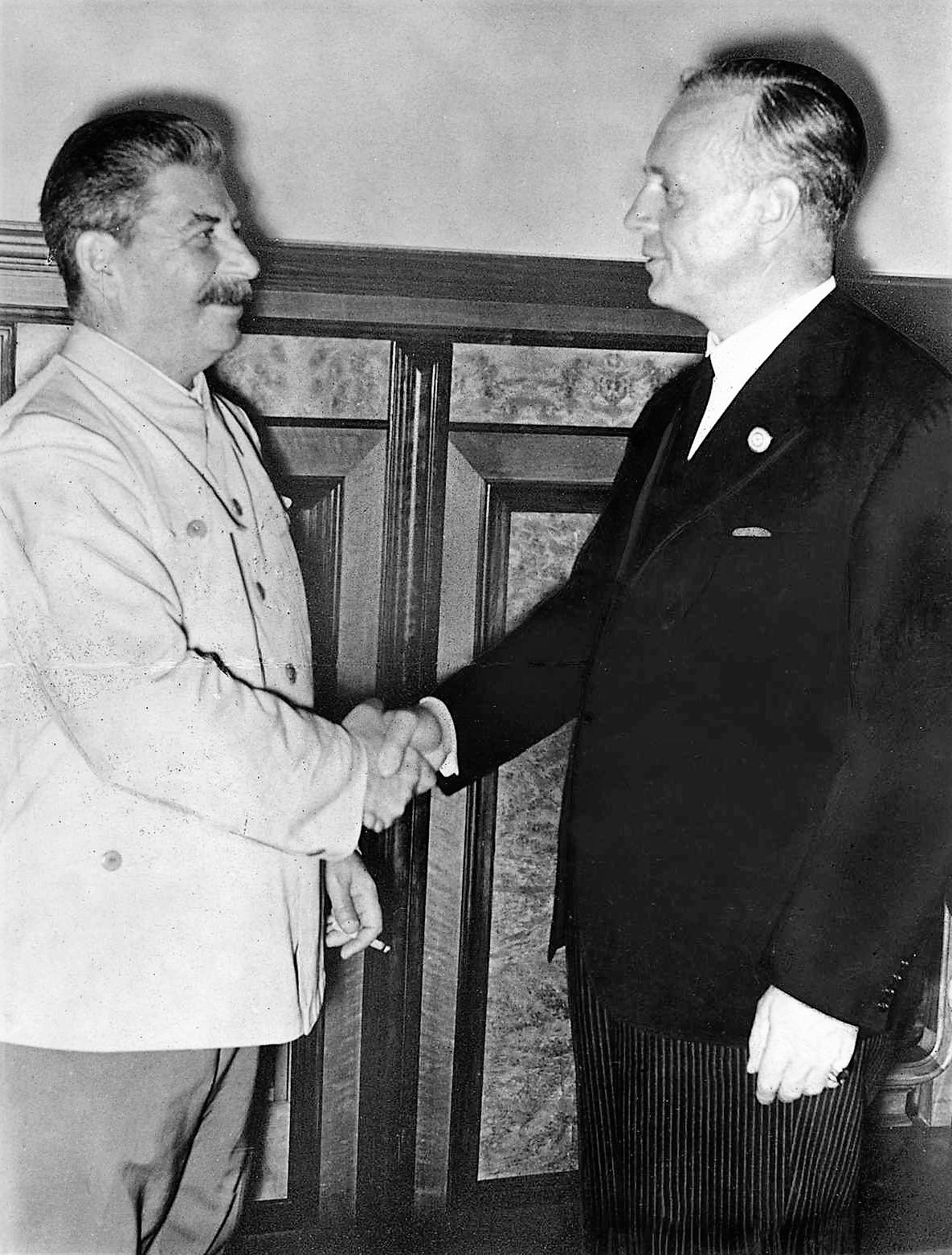
Stalin and Ribbentrop at the signing of the Pact

Germany and the Soviet Union signed a commercial agreement, dated August 19, providing for the trade of certain German military and civilian equipment in exchange for Soviet raw materials. The agreement provided for roughly 200 million in Soviet imports of raw materials (for which they would receive a seven-year line of credit), German exports of weapons, military technology and civilian machinery. "current" business, which entailed Soviet obligations to deliver 180 million Reichsmarks in raw materials and German commitment to provide the Soviets with 120 million Reichsmarks of German industrial goods. German Foreign Ministry official Karl Schnurre noted at the time that "[t]he movement of goods envisaged by the agreement might therefore reach a total of more than 1 billion Reichsmarks for the next few years." Schnurre also wrote "[a]part from the economic import of the treaty, its significance lies in the fact that the negotiations also served to renew political contacts with Russia and that the credit agreement was considered by both sides as the first decisive step in the reshaping of political relations." Pravda published an article on August 21 declaring that the August 19 commercial agreement "may appear as a serious step in the cause of improving not only economic, but also political relations between the USSR and Germany." Soviet foreign minister Vyacheslav Molotov wrote in Pravda that day that the deal was "better than all earlier treaties" and "we have never managed to reach such a favorable economic agreement with Britain, France or any other country."

Early in the morning of August 24, the Soviet Union and Germany signed the political and military deal that accompanied the trade agreement, the Molotov–Ribbentrop Pact. The pact was an agreement of mutual non-aggression between the countries. It contained secret protocols dividing the states of Northern and Eastern Europe into German and Soviet "spheres of influence." At the time, Stalin considered the trade agreement to be more important than the non-aggression pact.

At the signing, Ribbentrop and Stalin enjoyed warm conversations, exchanged toasts and further addressed the prior hostilities between the countries in the 1930s. They characterized Britain as always attempting to disrupt Soviet-German relations, stated that the Anti-Comintern pact was not aimed at the Soviet Union, but actually aimed at Western democracies and "frightened principally the City of London [i.e., the British financiers] and the English shopkeepers."

== Division of Central Europe ==
Planned and actual territorial changes in Central Europe 1939–1940

One week after the Molotov–Ribbentrop Pact, the partition of Poland commenced with the German invasion of western Poland. The British Ministry of Economic Warfare immediately began an economic blockade of Germany. At the outset, Britain realized that this blockade would be less effective than their blockade of Germany in World War I because of current German allies Italy and the Soviet Union.

On September 17, the Red Army invaded eastern Poland and occupied the Polish territory assigned to it by the Molotov–Ribbentrop Pact, followed by co-ordination with German forces in Poland. Three Baltic States described by the Molotov–Ribbentrop Pact, Estonia, Latvia, and Lithuania, were given no choice but to sign a so-called Pact of defense and mutual assistance which permitted the Soviet Union to station troops in them.

== Talks to expand the economic pact ==
=== German raw materials crisis and Soviet needs after Poland ===
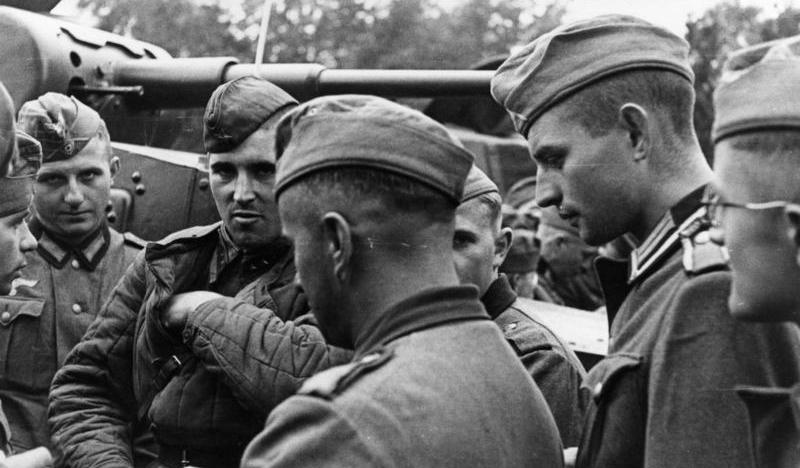
Soviet and German soldiers meet in Lublin, Poland (September 1939)

Hitler's pressing for a German invasion of Poland in 1939 placed tremendous strain on the German war machine, which had been gradually gearing up after the Treaty of Versailles restrictions for "total war" ("totaler Krieg") in 1942 or 1943. The German navy was also critically short of maritime and military assets and did not achieve full mobilization until 1942. While the Soviet alliance provided a huge military benefit to Germany, which thereafter had to station only four regular and nine territorial divisions on its eastern border, even the quick Germany victory in Poland strained its 1939 military resources, leaving it with only six weeks of munitions supplies and no considerable manpower reserve. In the face of a British blockade, the only remaining state capable of supplying Germany with the oil, rubber, manganese, grains, fats and platinum it needed was the Soviet Union.

In addition, Germany had imported 140.8 million Reichsmarks in Polish goods in 1938, and half of that territory was now held by the Soviet Union. The Soviets now occupied fields amounting to seventy per cent of Poland's oil production. Germany needed more of an economic alliance with the Soviet Union for raw materials than the economic partnership that the August 19 1939 agreement provided. At the same time, the Soviets' demands for manufactured goods, such as German machines, were increasing while its ability to import those goods from outside decreased when many countries ceased trading relations after the Soviet entry into the Molotov–Ribbentrop Pact. The Soviet Union could offer precious little technology, while Germany possessed the technology the Soviet Union needed to build a blue-water fleet. Accordingly, for the next six weeks, especially after the Soviet and German invasions of Poland, Germany pressed hard for an additional agreement.

At the same time, the United States, which supplied over 60% of Soviet machines and equipment, stopped armament shipments to the Soviet Union after the Molotov–Ribbentrop Pact. It imposed a full embargo after the Soviet 1939 invasion of Finland. Soviet quality controllers were expelled from the United States aircraft industry and already paid-for orders were suspended. With similar trade with France and Britain ceased, Germany was the only alternative for many goods.

=== Negotiations ===
After the division of Poland, the parties signed a September 28 German–Soviet Boundary and Friendship Treaty ceding Lithuania to the Soviets, the preamble of which stated the countries' intention "to develop economic relations and trade between Germany and the Soviet Union by all possible means." It continued "for this purpose an economic programme is to be set up by both parties, according to which the Soviet Union is to deliver raw materials to Germany, who will balance these out by means of long-term industrial shipments." The result of this would be that mutual trade would "once again reach the high level achieved in the past." Thereafter, oil, foodstuffs and cattle produced in the Soviet-occupied area of Poland was sent to Germany in accordance with the economic cooperation clause of the September 28 treaty. One week later, Ribbentrop gave the green light for a new round of talks.

In early October, German officials proposed a deal that would have increased Soviet raw material exports (oil, iron ore, rubber, tin, etc.) to Germany by over 400%, while the Soviets requested massive quantities of German weapons and technology, including the delivery of German naval cruisers Lützow, Seydlitz and Prinz Eugen. At the same time, Germany accepted an offer by the Soviet Union to provide Germany a naval base, Basis Nord, at then undeveloped Zapadnaya Litsa (120 kilometers from Murmansk) from which they could stage raiding operations.

Stalin personally stepped in to intervene on deteriorating talks. Further discussions took place in Moscow in early February regarding the specifics of German military equipment to be provided. Germany agreed that the plans for the battleship Bismarck could be included in the war materials to be provided to the Soviet Union.

== 1940 commercial agreement ==
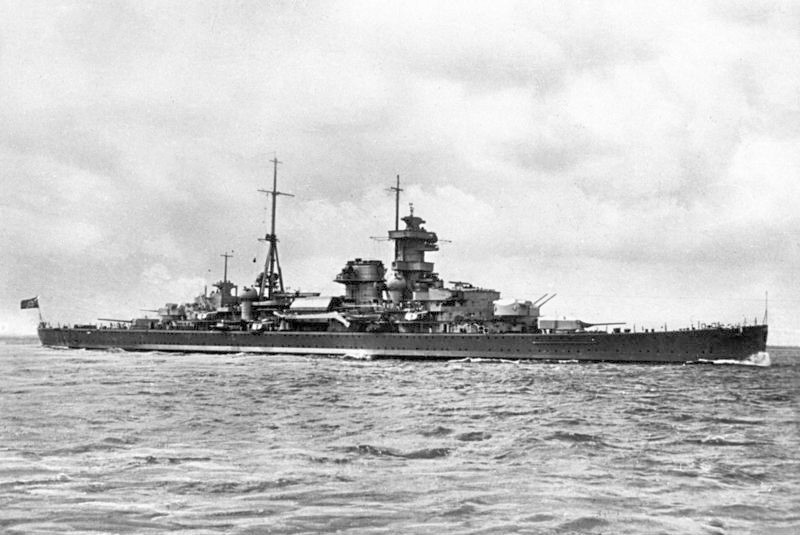
Admiral Hipper-class heavy cruiser

On February 11, 1940, Germany and the Soviet Union entered into the German-Soviet Commercial Agreement, an intricate trade pact in which the Soviet Union would send Germany 650 million Reichsmark in raw materials in exchange for 650 million Reichsmark in machinery, manufactured goods and technology. The trade pact helped Germany to surmount the British blockade of Germany. The main raw materials specified in the agreement were one million tons of grain, 900,000 tons of oil and more than 500,000 tons of various metal ores (mostly iron ore) in exchange for synthetic material plants, ships, turrets, machine tools and coal. The agreement also contained a "Confidential Protocol" providing the Soviet Union would undertake purchases from third party countries of "metals and other goods" on behalf of Germany.

The Soviets were to receive the incomplete Admiral Hipper-class heavy cruiser Lützow, the plans to the battleship Bismarck, information on German naval testing, "complete machinery for a large destroyer", heavy naval guns, three 38.1 cm (15.0 in) twin turrets to defend ports, preliminary sketches for a 40.6 cm triple turret, working drawings for a 28 cm turret, other naval gear and samples of thirty of Germany's latest warplanes, including the Bf 109 fighter, Bf 110 fighter and Ju 88 bomber. Stalin believed the Lutzow to be important because of its new 20.3 cm naval guns, along with their performance characteristics. The Soviets would also receive oil and electric equipment, locomotives, turbines, generators, diesel engines, ships, machine tools and samples of German artillery, tanks, explosives, chemical-warfare equipment and other items.

== Expanded economic relationship ==
=== Soviet provision of raw materials and other help ===
Under the aegis of the economic agreements, Soviet-German exports and imports increased tenfold. While some slowdowns and negotiations occurred, the Soviet Union met all of its requirements under the agreement. It became a major supplier of vital materials to Germany, including petroleum, manganese, copper, nickel, chrome, platinum, lumber and grain. During the first period of the agreement (February 11, 1940, to February 11, 1941), Germany received:

- 139,500 tons of cotton
- 500,000 tons of iron ores
- 300,000 tons of scrap metal and pig iron

Soviet goods were freighted to Brest-Litovsk, through occupied Polish territories and then shifted to European gauge track to Germany to circumvent the British naval blockade. The Soviets also granted Germany the right to transit for German traffic to and from Romania, Iran, Afghanistan and other countries in the east, while reducing by 50 per cent freight rates to Manchukuo, which was under Japanese control. Soviet exports to Germany, using German figures, which do not count products still in transit during Operation Barbarossa (which came in after June 1941), include: (Note: Roberts (2006, p. 42) lists slightly different figures, with 2 million tons of petroleum products, 140,000 tons of manganese, 1.5 million tons of timber, 1.5 million tons of timber and 100,000 tons of cotton.)

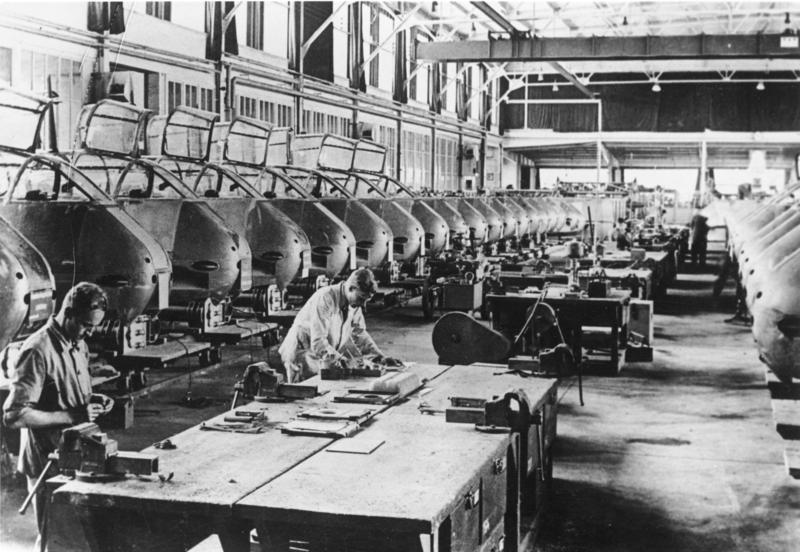
German Me 210 factory, 30 August 1944

	1939	1940	1941 (1st 6 mos.)	Soviet figures (September 1939 – 1941)
Oil Products	5.1	617.0	254.2	941.7
Grains	0.2	820.8	547.1	1611.1
Manganese ore	6.2	64.8	75.2	165.2
Phosphates	32.3	131.5	56.3	202.2
Technical oils & fats	4.4	11.0	8.9	NA
Chromium	0.0	26.3	0.0	23.4
Copper	0..0	7.1	7.2	NA
Nickel	0.0	1.5	0.7	NA
Legumes	10.9	47.2	34.8	NA
Tin	0.0	0.8	0.0	NA
Platinum	0.0	1.5	1.3	NA
Chemicals:Finished	0.9	2.9	0.2	NA
Chemicals:Unfinished	0.9	2.6	1.0	NA
Raw Textiles	9.0	99.1	41.1	171.4
Wood Products	171.9	846.7	393.7	1227.6
Oil Cake	0.0	29.0	8.6	41.8
*thousands of tons

The Soviet figures only include imports after September 1939 and differ, in part, because they include products that were in transit during Operation Barbarossa were not yet counted in the German figures, which count only the first six months of 1941.

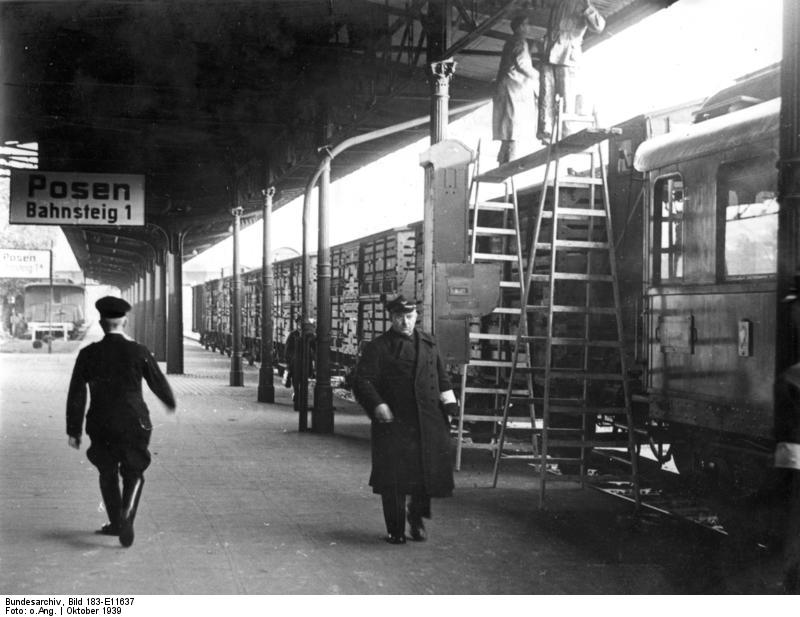
Freight train in German-occupied Poland, October 1939

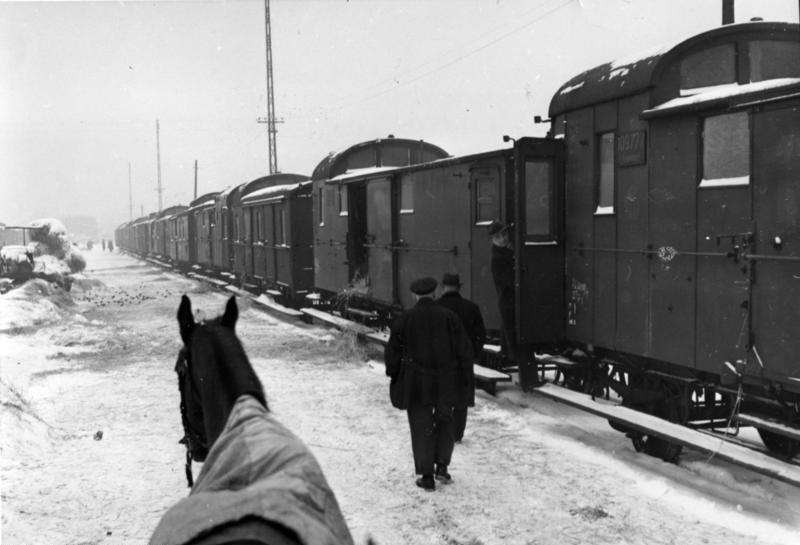
Potato train arrives in Berlin in January 1940

The Soviet Union also bought and shipped other materials to Germany, such as rubber from India. The Soviets shipped approximately 800 million reichsmarks worth of goods. Materials Germany imported from other countries using the Soviet Trans-Siberian Railway and from Afghanistan and Iran via the Soviet Union as an intermediary, including:

	1939	1940	1941 (1st 5 mos.)
Rubber	NA	4.5	14.3
Copper	NA	2.0	2.8
Soybeans	NA	58.5	109.4
Whale & Fish oil	NA	56.7	46.2
Nuts	NA	9.3	12.1
Tinned Foods	NA	5.0	3.8
Textiles	0.0	19.0	17.0
Legumes	0	7.0	2.0
Dried fruit	8.0	42.0	8.0
*thousands of tons

The trade pact helped Germany to surmount the British blockade of Germany. By June 1940, Soviet imports comprised over 50% of Germany's total overseas imports, and often exceed 70% of total German overseas imports.

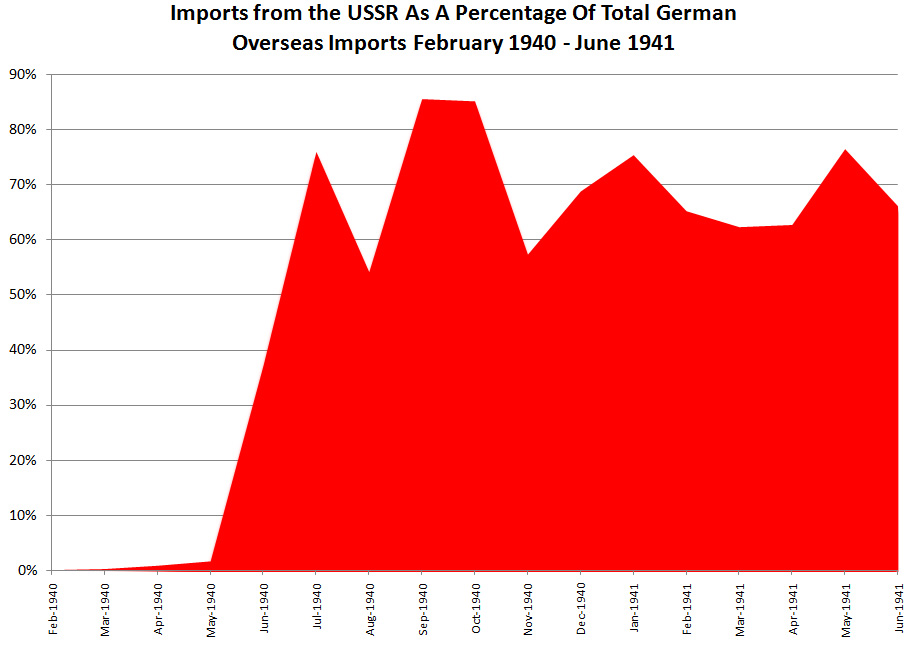
Imports from the USSR As A Percentage Of Total German Overseas Imports: February 1940 - June 1941

The Soviet Union further helped Germany to avoid the British blockade by providing a U-boat base at Basis Nord. In addition, the Soviets provided Germany with access to the Northern Sea Route for both cargo ships and raiders (though only the raider Komet used the route before the German invasion of the USSR)

There had never been such intensive trade between Germany and the Soviet Union as that which took place during the eighteen months of 1940 to June 1941. Soviet imports of chrome, manganese and platinum, for which Germany relied entirely on imports, made up 70% of Germany's total imports of those materials. While the Soviet Union provided 100% of German imports of rye, barley and oats, this was 20% of the amount of the total German harvest. Three quarters of Soviet oil and grain exports, two thirds of Soviet cotton exports and over 90% of Soviet wood exports were to the Reich alone. Germany supplied the Soviet Union with 31% of its imports, which was on par with United States imports into the Soviet Union. Germany supplied 46% of Soviet machine tool imports, and was its largest such supplier.

Particularly important were grain, manganese and chrome—vital ingredients of the German war economy that now faced the British naval blockade. In terms of imports and exports, the total balanced out at 500 million reichsmarks in either direction, but the strategic gain to Hitler was far greater than that to Stalin.

=== German summer worries and procrastination ===
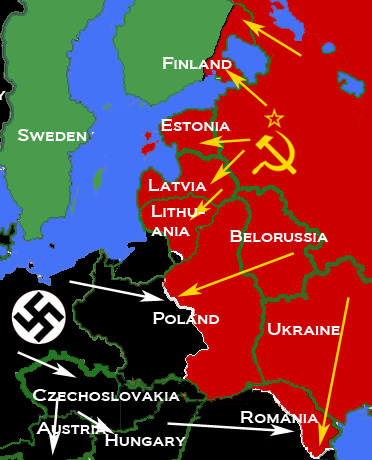

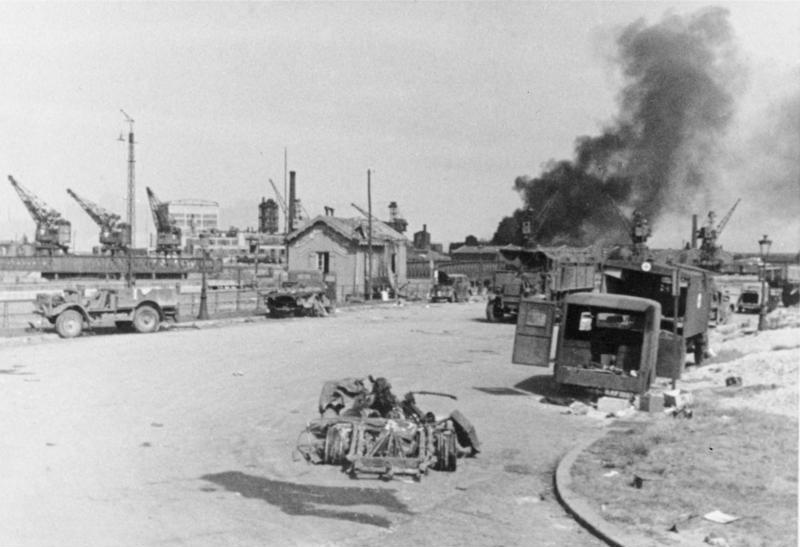
Burning French oil stocks in the port of Calais after British bombing in May 1940

In the summer of 1940, Germany grew even more dependent on Soviet imports. While German acquisitions of France, the Netherlands, and Belgium meant the capture of fuel and iron supplies, the additional territories created additional demand while decreasing avenues for indirect supply.

Soviet oil continued to flow to Germany, mostly by rail from Varna, Bulgaria directly to Wilhelmshaven. German officials noted that 150,000 tons of oil had been shipped monthly for five months, using about 900 German tank cars exclusively dedicated for that traffic. Hitler characterized the German need for that oil as "most pressing." He however noted that "This will not become critical as long as Romania and Russia continue their supplies and hydrogenation plants can be adequately protected against air attacks." After the forced Soviet occupation of the Romanian territories of Bessarabia and Northern Bucovina, Germany wanted the 100,000 tons of grain for which they had previously contracted with Bessarabia, guarantees of German property safety in Romania and reassurance that the train tracks carrying Romanian oil would be left alone. However, Germany had captured Norway's molybdenum mines, agreed to an oil-for arms pact with Romania in May and gained rail access to Spain with the capture of France.

The Soviet invasion of Lithuania, Estonia and Latvia in June 1940 resulted in the Soviet occupation of states on which Germany had relied for 96.7 million Reichsmarks of imports in 1938 at blackmailed favorable economic terms, but from which they now had to pay Soviet rates for goods. Compared to 1938 figures, Greater Germany and its sphere of influence lacked, among other items, 500,000 tons of manganese, 3.3 million tons of raw phosphate, 200,000 tons of rubber and 9.5 million tons of oil. An eventual invasion of the Soviet Union increasingly looked like the only way in which Hitler believed that Germany could solve that resource crisis. While no concrete plans were yet made, Hitler told one of his generals in June that the victories in Europe "finally freed his hands for his important real task: the showdown with Bolshevism", though German generals told Hitler that occupying Western Russia would create "more of a drain than a relief for Germany's economic situation." This included Kriegsmarine leader Erich Raeder, who consistently had opposed any war with the Soviet Union. Nevertheless, military planners were instructed to continued preparing for the eventual war in the east, in an operation that was then codenamed "Fritz".

Germany, which was provided 27 months to finish delivery of its goods, procrastinated as long as possible. Germany did initially deliver some floating cranes, five aircraft, an electrode shop, several gun turrets (with fire control apparatuses and spare parts), two submarine periscopes and additional ship construction tools. A few months later it delivered a sample of its harvest technology. Labor shortages caused by German rearmament pushes also slowed Germany's ability to export material. By the end of June, Germany had only delivered 82 million Reichsmarks in goods (including 25 million for the Lutzow) of the 600 million Reichsmarks in Soviet orders place by that time.

=== Delivery suspension ===
By August 1940, Germany was 73 million Reichsmarks behind on deliveries due under the 1940 commercial agreement. The Soviet Union had provided over 300 million Reichsmarks worth of raw materials, while the Germans provided less than half of that in finished products for compensation.

That month, the Soviet Union briefly suspended its deliveries after their relations were strained following disagreement over policy in the Balkans, the Soviet Union's war with Finland (from which Germany had imported 88.9 million Reichsmarks in goods in 1938), the German commercial delivery failures and with Stalin worried that Hitler's war with the West might end quickly after France signed an armistice. At that time, the Soviets also canceled all long range projects under the 1940 commercial agreement.

The suspension created significant resource problems for Germany. Ribbentrop wrote a letter promising Stalin that "in the opinion of the Fuhrer ... it appears to be the historical mission of the Four Powers – the Soviet Union, Italy, Japan and Germany – to adopt a long range-policy and to direct the future development of their peoples into the right channels by delimitation of their interests in a worldwide scale." By the end of August, relations improved again as the countries had redrawn the Hungarian and Romanian borders, settled Bulgarian claims and Stalin was again convinced that Germany would face a long war in the west with Britain's improvement in its air battle with Germany and the execution of an agreement between the United States and Britain regarding destroyers and bases. Soviet raw material deliveries increased well over prior figures.

Germany delayed its delivery of the cruiser Lützow and the plans for the Bismarck as long as possible, hoping to avoid delivery altogether if the war developed favorably, and it was later delivered in very incomplete state.

== Possible Soviet Axis membership and further economic talks ==
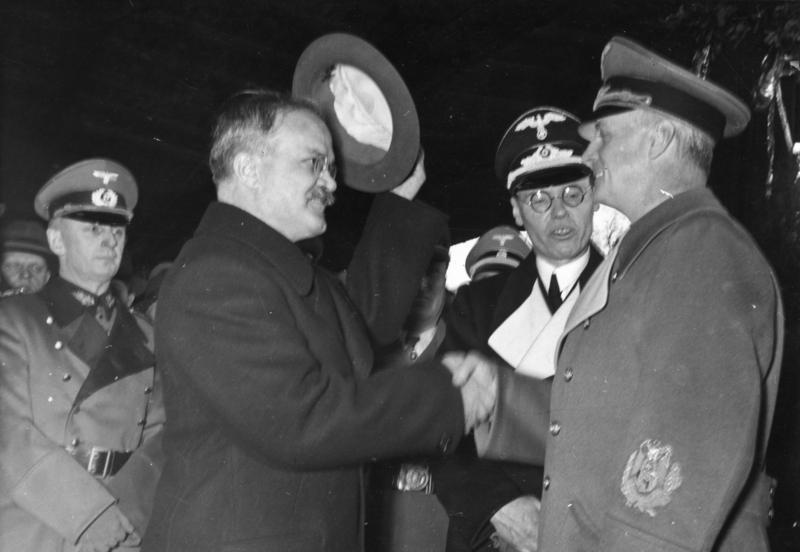
Joachim von Ribbentrop welcoming Vyacheslav Molotov in Berlin, November 1940

Hitler had been considering war with the Soviet Union since July 1940. However, after Germany entered the Axis Pact with Japan and Italy, in October 1940, the Soviet Union explored a possible entry into the Axis themselves. Stalin sent Molotov to Berlin to negotiate, where he negotiated with Ribbentrop and Hitler personally, who spoke at length about a division of the world after the destruction of Britain that would be like "a gigantic world estate in bankruptcy". After long discussions and proposals, Germany presented the Soviets with a draft written Axis pact agreement defining the world spheres of influence of the four proposed Axis powers (Japan, Germany, Soviet Union, Italy). Eleven days later, the Soviets presented a Stalin-drafted written counter-proposal where they would accept the four-power pact, but it included Soviet rights to Bulgaria and a world sphere of influence focus on the area around modern Iraq and Iran. The Soviets concurrently promised, by May 11, 1941, the delivery of 2.5 million tons of grain—1 million tons above its current obligations. They also promised full compensation for the Volksdeutsche property claims. Germany never responded to the counter-proposal. Shortly thereafter, Hitler issued a secret directive on the eventual attempts to invade the Soviet Union.

Hitler wanted an additional economic deal to get what he could from the Soviet Union before the invasion, while other German officials wanted such a deal in the hopes that it could change the current anti-Soviet direction of German policy. Knowing they were preparing for an invasion of the Soviet Union, German negotiators pushed to delay the delivery of German goods beyond the summer of 1941. Suspicious of German delays, in December, the Soviets demanded that all questions pending between the countries be resolved before an agreement could be made. Tensions had already built after Germany had ignored Stalin's letter regarding Axis membership, with negotiators almost coming to blows at one point. At the same time, German war planners were aware of the potential fragility of Soviet oil, agreeing with Allied military assessments that they had captured in France saying that "a few incendiary bombs would have sufficed to shut down Baku for years."

At the same time, Britain was forecasting continued German oil problems. The British Chiefs of Staff produced a report in September 1940 predicting a possible exhaustion of German oil stocks by June 1941. They believed that Germany could only improve its position by defeating Britain or by driving the Royal Navy from the Eastern Mediterranean so that Germany could import Soviet and Romanian oil supplies by sea. An American spy then viewed a December German report detailing the need for an invasion of the Soviet Union because of projected mid-1941 shortages of heavy metals and other supplies.

== 1941 border and commercial agreement ==
On January 10, 1941, Germany and the Soviet Union signed agreements in Moscow to settle all of the open disputes that the Soviets had demanded. The agreements extended trade regulation of the 1940 German-Soviet Commercial Agreement until August 1, 1942, and increased deliveries above the levels of year one of that agreement to 620 to 640 million Reichsmark. It also settled several border, trading rights, property compensation and immigration disputes. It further covered the migration to Germany within two and a half months of ethnic Germans and German citizens in Soviet-held Baltic territories, and the migration to the Soviet Union of Baltic and "White Russian" "nationals" in German-held territories. Secret protocols in the new agreement stated that Germany would renounce its claims to a strip of territory in Lithuania it had received in the "Secret Additional Protocols" of the German–Soviet Boundary and Friendship Treaty, in exchange for 7.5 million dollars (31.5 million Reichsmark). Because of currency fluctuation issues, the parties used American dollar demarcations for compensation totals.

Because of a stronger German negotiation position, Karl Schnurre concluded that, in economic terms, the agreement was "the greatest Germany ever concluded, going well beyond the previous year's February agreement." The agreement included Soviet commitments to 2.5 million tons of grain shipments and 1 million tons of oil shipments, as well as large amounts of nonferrous and precious metals. German Special Ambassador Karl Ritter, in a state of near-euphoria over Germany's achievement, wrote a directive to all German embassies that "While Britain and the United States have up to now been unsuccessful in their efforts to come to an agreement with the Soviet Union in any field, the Soviet Union has concluded with Germany, the largest contract ever between two states."

On January 17, 1941, Molotov asked German officials whether the parties could then work out an agreement for entry into the Axis pact. Molotov expressed astonishment at the absence of any answer to the Soviets' November 25 offer to join the Pact. They never received an answer. Germany was already planning its invasion of the Soviet Union. On December 18, 1940, Hitler had signed War Directive No. 21 to the German high command for an operation now codenamed Operation Barbarossa stating: "The German Wehrmacht must be prepared to crush Soviet Russia in a quick campaign." Hitler directed Raeder that Germany would have to take Polyarny and Murmansk at that time to cut off access to aid that would come to the Soviet Union.

== Late Soviet attempts to improve relations ==
Even though Stalin was preparing for a likely war, he still believed that he could at least avoid a short-term clash. In an effort to demonstrate peaceful intentions toward Germany, on April 13, 1941, the Soviets signed a neutrality pact with Axis power Japan. During that signing ceremony, Stalin embraced the German ambassador and exclaimed "we must remain friends and you must do everything to that end!" While Stalin had little faith in Japan's commitment to neutrality, he felt that the pact was important for its political symbolism, to reinforce a public affection for Germany. Stalin felt that there was a growing split in German circles about whether Germany should initiate a war with the Soviet Union.

Stalin did not know that Hitler had been secretly discussing an invasion of the Soviet Union since summer 1940, and that Hitler had ordered his military in late 1940 to prepare for war in the East regardless of the parties talks of a potential Soviet entry as a fourth Axis power. He had ignored German economic naysayers, and told Hermann Göring "that everyone on all sides was always raising economic misgivings against a threatening war with Russia. From now onwards he wasn't going to listen to any more of that kind of talk and from now on he was going to stop up his ears in order to get his peace of mind." This was passed on to General Georg Thomas, who had been preparing reports on the negative economic consequences of a Soviet invasion—that it would be a net economic drain unless it was captured intact. Given Hitler's latest demands regarding negative advice, Thomas revised his report. Reich Finance Minister Schwerin-Krosigk also opposed an invasion, arguing that Germany would lose grain because of Soviet scorched-earth policies, lack of effective Soviet transport and the loss of production labor with a German attack in the East. Schnurre agreed with the economic loss assessment.

German generals and others delayed several orders, such that they were never delivered, such as the delivery of German combat aircraft. German officials also procrastinated on the next round of trade balance talks.

Soviet willingness to deliver increased in April, with Hitler telling German officials attempting to dissuade him of attack that concessions would be even greater if 150 German divisions were on their borders. Stalin greeted Schnurre at the Moscow railroad station with the phrase "We will remain friends with you – in any event." The Soviets also deferred to German demands regarding Finland, Romania and border settlements. In an April 28 meeting with Hitler, German ambassador to Moscow Friedrich Werner von der Schulenburg stated that Stalin was prepared to make even further concessions, including up to 5 million tons of grain in the next year alone, with Acting Military Attache Krebs adding that the Soviets "will do anything to avoid war and yielded on every issue short of making territorial concessions."

Stalin also attempted a further cautious economic appeasement of Germany, shipping items in May and June for which German firms had not even placed orders. German officials concluded in May that "we could make economic demands on Moscow which would even go beyond the scope of the treaty of January 10, 1941." That same month, German naval officials stated that "the Russian government is endeavoring to do everything to prevent a conflict with Germany." By June 18, four days before the German invasion, the Soviets had even promised the Japanese that they could ship much greater totals along the Trans-Siberian Railway.

Soviet rubber shipments greatly increased in later months, filling up German warehouses and the Soviet transports systems. 76% of the total of 18,800 tons of vital rubber sent to Germany was shipped in May and June 1941. 2,100 tons of it crossed the border only hours before the German invasion began.

== Hitler breaks the Pact ==
German advances from June 22, 1941, to December 5, 1941

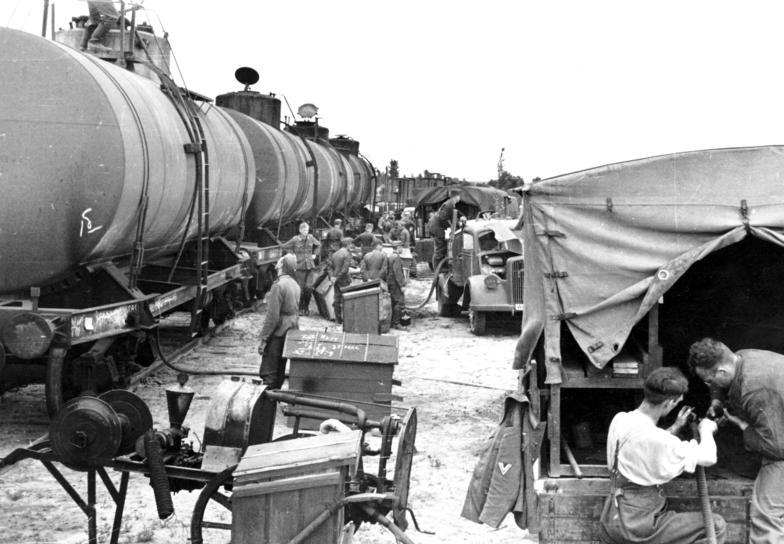
Germans refueling with train tank cars one week into Operation Barbarossa

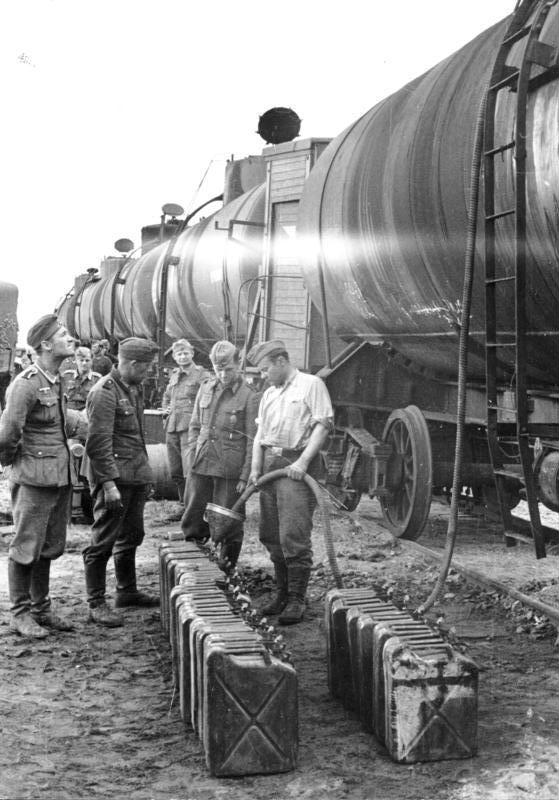
Germans refueling with train tank cars one week into Operation Barbarossa

=== Initial invasion ===
On June 22, 1941, Germany began Operation Barbarossa, the invasion of the Soviet Union through the territories that the two countries had previously divided. Because it had planned to attack the Soviet Union since late 1940, Germany managed to avoid delivery of about 750 million Reichsmarks of goods it was to have delivered under the economic agreements. This, however, cost Germany about 520 million Reichsmarks in counter-deliveries that the Soviets might otherwise have made before the invasion. Shortly before the June 22 attack, German ships began leaving Soviet harbors, some without being unloaded. That night after the invasion, Germans ferried out their remaining workers on the Lützow project, and Soviet naval workers let them go.

After the launch of the invasion, within six months, the Soviet military had suffered 4.3 million casualties and Germany had captured three million Soviet prisoners, two million of whom would die in German captivity by February 1942. German forces had advanced 1,050 miles (1,690 km), and maintained a linearly measured front of 1,900 miles (3,100 km).

Soviet neutrality between 1939 and 1941 helped Germany to avoid a two front war. In 1941 Germany concentrated most of the Wehrmacht eastward in 1941, while continuing Soviet imports to Germany would prove vital to the German invasion of the Soviet Union. Ironically, despite fears causing the Soviet Union to enter deals with Germany in 1939, that Germany came so close to destroying the Soviet Union was due largely to Soviet actions taken from 1939 to 1941. Soviet raw materials supplies had helped convince German generals, who previously had refused to even discuss a Soviet invasion, to go along with Hitler's plans. Soviet imports into Germany, especially oil, proved essential for the Wehrmacht's conduct of the coming invasion. Without Soviet imports, German stocks would have run out in several key products by October 1941, within three and a half months. Germany would have already run through their stocks of rubber and grain before the first day of the invasion were it not for Soviet imports:

	Tot USSR imports	June 1941 German Stocks	June 1941 (w/o USSR imports)	October 1941 German Stocks	October 1941 (w/o USSR imports)
Oil Products	912	1350	438	905	-7
Rubber	18.8	13.8	-4.9	12.1	-6.7
Manganese	189.5	205	15.5	170	-19.5
Grain	1637.1	1381	-256.1	761	-876.1
*German stocks in thousands of tons (with and without USSR imports-October 1941 aggregate)

Without Soviet deliveries of these four major items, Germany could barely have attacked the Soviet Union, let alone come close to victory, even with more intense rationing. Estimates of any Soviet gains from the German weapons and technology are difficult, though they were certainly less vital for the Soviets than the Soviet raw material imports were for Germany. The Lützow was never completed, and the Soviets used it as an immobile gun battery until its sinking on September 17, though it was later refloated. however, Soviet aviation experts were satisfied with their modest aircraft purchases. Although many of the machine tools and other equipment exported to the Soviet Union was destroyed or captured in the Nazi invasion, the remainder likely still played an important role in reequipping the Red Army. German coal deliveries exceeded what the Soviets could have received from other sources.

In total, Germany had shipped only 500 million Reichsmarks of products to the Soviet Union. This paled in comparison, for example, to the over 5 billion Reichsmarks of goods the Allies sent the Russians in 1942 alone, and over 13 billion Reichsmarks of total goods during the course of the war.

=== After Operation Barbarossa ===
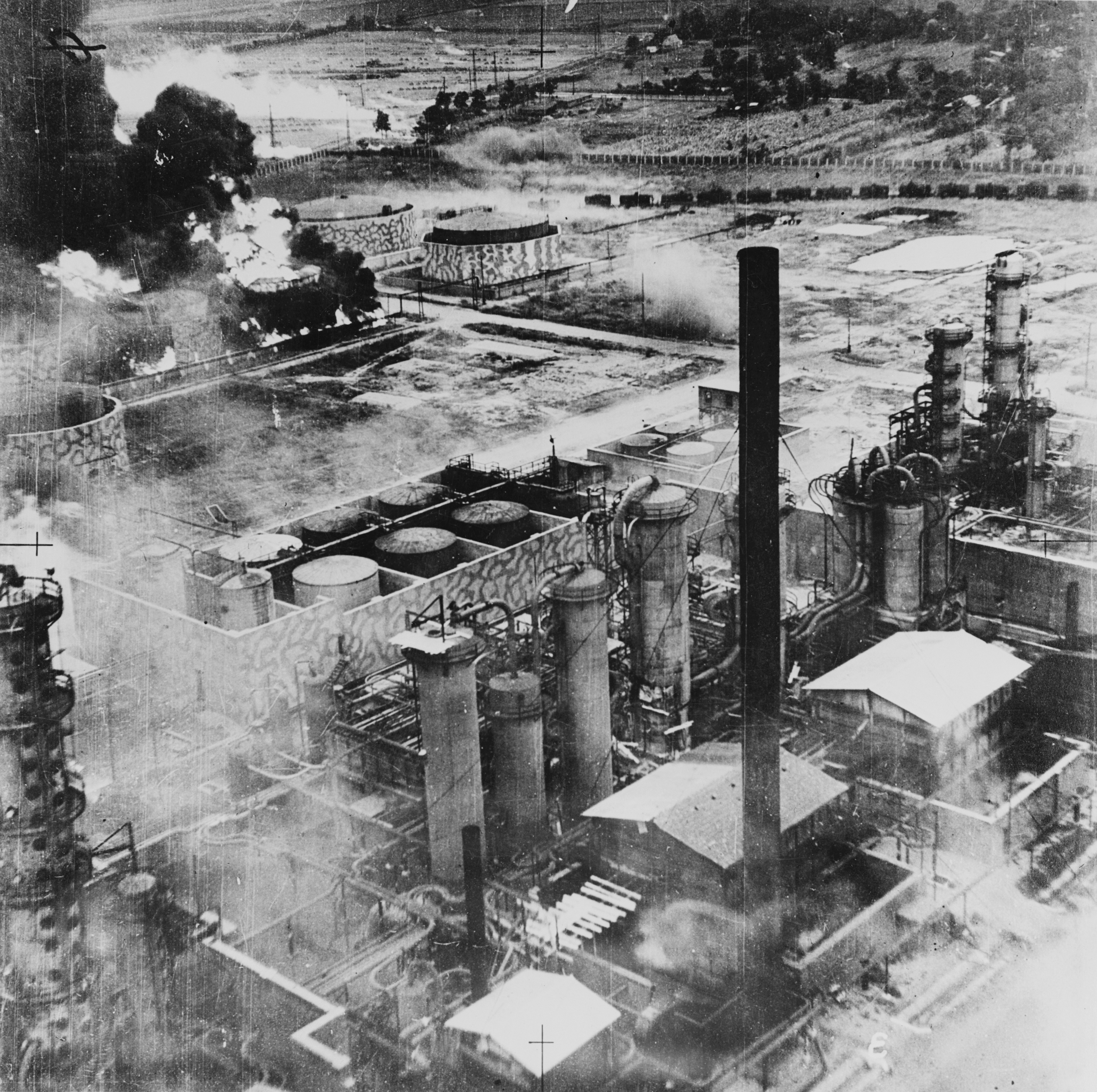
German oil refineries in Ploiești, Romania bombed by the United States in 1943

While, by December 1941, Hitler's troops had advanced to within 20 miles of the Kremlin in Moscow, the Soviets launched a counteroffensive, pushing German troops back 40–50 miles from Moscow, the Wehrmacht's first significant defeat of the war. More importantly, between July and December 1941, the Soviets had moved 2,593 enterprises—most of them iron, steel and engineering plants—and 50,000 small workshops and factories to the Ural Mountains in the Volga region, to Kazakhstan and to Eastern Siberia, away from the Nazi forces who had already occupied vast quantities of European Russia. One and a half million wagon-loads were carried eastward over the Soviet rail networks, including 16 million Soviet citizens to man the factories. Almost half of Soviet industrial investment was devoted to restarting the transported factories and building new ones in the eastern territories. By 1942, these safe eastern zones supplied three quarters of all Soviet weapons and almost all iron and steel.

Worried by the possibility of American support after their entry into the war following the Attack on Pearl Harbor, and a potential Anglo-American invasion on the Western Front in 1942 (which would not actually happen until 1944), Hitler shifted his primary goal from an immediate victory in the East, to the more long-term goal of securing the southern Soviet Union to protect oil fields vital to a long-term German war effort. The German southern campaign began with a push to capture the Crimea which ended in disaster for the Red Army, and caused Stalin to issue a broad scolding of his generals' leadership. In their southern campaigns, the Germans took 625,000 Red Army prisoners in July and August 1942 alone. Feeling the Soviets were all but defeated, the Germans then began another southern operation in the fall of 1942, the Battle of Stalingrad, which would end up marking the beginning of a turning point in the war for the Soviet Union. Although the Soviets suffered in excess of 1.1 million casualties at Stalingrad, the victory over German forces, including the encirclement of 290,000 Axis troops, marked a turning point in the war. The Soviets repulsed the German strategic southern campaign and, although 2.5 million Soviet casualties were suffered in that effort, it permitted the Soviets to take the offensive for most of the rest of the war on the Eastern Front.

Without Soviet goods, from 1942 to the end of the war, German war efforts were severely hampered with Germany barely managing to scrape together enough reserves for a few more major offensives. In terms of supplies, oil was the main obstacle, with shortages in some places by the end of 1941 and forcing Germany to turn south to attempt to invade the oil-rich Caucasus in 1942. The Reich was forced to exist on a hand-to-mouth basis for oil, and the almost non-existent oil stocks completely disappeared by mid-1944 with Allied bombers concentrating on German synthetic fuel plants. For example, most German war aircraft sat idle, and air training for new pilots was cut to a mere one hour per week.

Food supplies also dwindled. The envisioned 5 million tons per year that was supposed to come from occupied lands after Barbarossa never materialized. In fact, Germany managed to ship only 1.5 million tons of grain from the region in the remaining four years of the war. Germany was forced to ration its use of manganese and other materials. However, it was later able to address the severe rubber shortages it faced with large amounts of synthetic production that began with plants coming on line starting in 1942, and it used blockade breakers to get the 10-15% of natural rubber the plants needed for the expensive synthetic rubber process.

In total, as Hitler's generals had warned him, few raw materials were gained from the Soviet invasion. Over the entire four years of the war after Barbarossa, Germany managed to squeeze out only 4.5 billion Reichsmark of Soviet goods in total from occupied Soviet territories, a fraction of what Hitler thought it could gain.

Stalin was confident of victory even as Hitler's troops pressed the outskirts of Moscow in the fall and winter of 1941. In September 1941, Stalin told British diplomats that he wanted two agreements: (1) a mutual assistance/aid pact and (2) a recognition that, after the war, the Soviet Union would gain the territories in countries that it had taken pursuant to its division of Eastern Europe with Hitler in the Molotov–Ribbentrop Pact. The British agreed to assistance but refused to agree upon the territorial gains, which Stalin accepted months later as the military situation deteriorated somewhat in mid-1942. In November 1941, Stalin rallied his generals in a speech given underground in Moscow, telling them that the German blitzkrieg would fail because of weaknesses on the German rear in Nazi-occupied Europe and the underestimation of the strength of the Red Army, such that Germany's war effort would crumble against the British-American-Soviet "war engine".

Fending off the German invasion and pressing to victory in the East required a tremendous sacrifice by the Soviet Union. Soviet military casualties totaled approximately 35 million (official figures 28.2 million) with approximately 14.7 million killed, missing or captured (official figures 11.285 million). Although figures vary, the Soviet civilian death toll probably reached 20 million. Millions of Soviet soldiers and civilians disappeared into German detention camps and slave labor factories, while millions more suffered permanent physical and mental damage. Economic losses, including losses in resources and manufacturing capacity in western Russia and Ukraine, were also catastrophic. The war resulted in the destruction of approximately 70,000 Soviet cities, towns and villages. Destroyed in that process were 6 million houses, 98,000 farms, 32,000 factories, 82,000 schools, 43,000 libraries, 6,000 hospitals and thousands of miles of roads and railway track.

== Production during the Pact ==
While Germany's population of 68.6 million people was the second largest in Europe, that was dwarfed by the 167 million in the Soviet Union. However, Germany over doubled the Soviet Union's real per capita Gross Domestic Product. During the Pact period, it generally outspent the Soviet Union over 2-to-1 in military spending as measured in 1990 dollars:

	Germany GDP (1990 $Bil.)	USSR GDP (1990 $Bil.)	German GDP Per Capita	USSR GDP Per Capita	German Defense Spending % of Nat'l Income	USSR Defense Spending % of Nat'l Income
1939	$384	$366	$5,598	$2,192	23.0%	12.6%
1940	$387	$417	$5,641	$2,497	40.0%	17.0%
1941	$412	$359	$6,006	$2,150	52.0%	28.0%
*Dollar denominations are in billions of 1990 dollars.

== See also ==
- German–Soviet Border and Commercial Agreement
- German–Soviet Commercial Agreement (1939)
- German aid to Soviet civilians in World War II
- Molotov–Ribbentrop Pact
- Molotov–Ribbentrop Pact negotiations
- Invasion of Poland
- Soviet invasion of Poland
- German–Soviet Commercial Agreement (1940)
- Basis Nord
- Soviet–German relations before 1941
- Operation Barbarossa

== Bibliography ==
- Alexander, Bevin (2000), How Hitler Could Have Won World War II, Three Rivers Press, ISBN 978-0-609-80844-3
- Bendersky, Joseph W. (2000). A History of Nazi Germany: 1919-1945. Rowman & Littlefield. ISBN 0-8304-1567-X.
- Berezhkov, V. M.; Mikheyev, Sergei M. (1994). At Stalin's side : his interpreter's memoirs from the October Revolution to the fall of the dictator's empire. Secaucus, NJ: Carol Pub. Group. ISBN 978-1-55972-212-4.
- Biskupski, Mieczyslaw B.; Wandycz, Piotr Stefan (2003). Ideology, Politics, and Diplomacy in East Central Europe. Boydell & Brewer. ISBN 1-58046-137-9.
- Brackman, Roman (2001), The Secret File of Joseph Stalin: A Hidden Life, Frank Cass Publishers, ISBN 978-0-7146-5050-0
- Child, Frank C. (1978). The Theory and Practice of Exchange Control in Germany. Ayer Publishing. ISBN 0-405-11209-2.
- Churchill, Winston (1953). The Second World War. Houghton Mifflin Harcourt. ISBN 0-395-41056-8.
- Cohen, Yohanon (1989). Small Nations in Times of Crisis and Confrontation. SUNY Press. ISBN 0-7914-0018-2.
- Dippel, John Van Houten (1992). Two Against Hitler: Stealing the Nazis' Best-Kept Secrets. Greenwood Publishing Group. ISBN 0-275-93745-3.
- Donaldson, Robert H.; Nogee, Joseph L. (2005). The Foreign Policy of Russia: Changing Systems, Enduring Interests. M.E. Sharpe. ISBN 0-7656-1568-1.
- Erickson, John (2001), The Soviet High Command: A Military-political History, 1918–1941, Routledge, ISBN 978-0-7146-5178-1
- Ericson, Edward E. (1999), Feeding the German Eagle: Soviet Economic Aid to Nazi Germany, 1933–1941, Greenwood Publishing Group, ISBN 978-0-275-96337-8
- Fest, Joachim C. (2002), Hitler, Houghton Mifflin Harcourt, ISBN 978-0-15-602754-0
- Figes, Orlando (2007), The Whisperers: Private Life in Stalin's Russia, Macmillan, ISBN 978-0-8050-7461-1
- Glantz, David (October 11, 2001). The Soviet-German War 1941–45: Myths and Realities: A Survey Essay. Clemson, South Carolina: Strom Thurmond Institute of Government and Public Affairs, Clemson University.
- Grenville, John Ashley Soames; Wasserstein, Bernard (2001), The Major International Treaties of the Twentieth Century: A History and Guide with Texts, Taylor & Francis, ISBN 978-0-415-23798-7
- Harrison, Mark (2000), The Economics of World War II: Six Great Powers in International Comparison, Cambridge University Press, ISBN 978-0-521-78503-7
- Harrison, Mark (1997), "The Sovietmilitary-economic effort during the second five year plan (1933-1937)" (PDF), Europe-Asia Studies, 49 (3): 369–406, doi:10.1080/09668139708412447
- Hehn, Paul N. (2005), A Low Dishonest Decade: The Great Powers, Eastern Europe, and the Economic Origins of World War II, 1930–1941, Continuum International Publishing Group, ISBN 978-0-8264-1761-9
- Imlay, Talbot C. (2003). Facing the Second World War: Strategy, Politics, and Economics in Britain and France 1938–1940. Oxford University Press. ISBN 0-19-926122-9.
- Johari, J.C. (2000). Soviet Diplomacy 1925-41: 1925-27. Anmol Publications PVT. LTD. ISBN 81-7488-491-2.
- Jurado, Carlos Caballero; Bujeiro, Ramiro (2006). The Condor Legion: German Troops in the Spanish Civil War. Osprey Publishing. ISBN 1-84176-899-5.
- Kulikov, Victor (March 2000). "Des occasions en or pour Staline, ou les avions allemands en URSS" [Golden Opportunities for Stalin, or German Aircraft in the USSR]. Avions: Toute l'Aéronautique et son histoire (in French) (84): 16–23. ISSN 1243-8650.
- Kulikov, Victor (April 2000). "Des occasions en or pour Staline, ou les avions allemands en URSS". Avions: Toute l'Aéronautique et son histoire (in French) (85): 44–49. ISSN 1243-8650.
- Lee, Stephen J.; Shuter, Paul (1996). Weimar and Nazi Germany. Heinemann. ISBN 0-435-30920-X.
- Lewis, Arthur W. (2003). Economic Survey 1919-1939. Routledge. ISBN 0-415-31359-7.
- Moss, Walter (2005). A History of Russia: Since 1855. Anthem Press. ISBN 1-84331-034-1.
- Murray, Williamson (1984), The Change in the European Balance of Power, Princeton: Princeton University Press
- Murray, Williamson; Millett, Allan (2001), A War to be Won: Fighting the Second World War, Harvard University Press, ISBN 978-0-674-00680-5
- Müller, Rolf-Dieter; Ueberschär, Gerd R. (2002). Hitler's War in the East, 1941-1945: A Critical Assessment. Berghahn Books. ISBN 1-57181-293-8.
- Nekrich, Aleksandr Moiseevich; Ulam, Adam Bruno; Freeze, Gregory L. (1997), Pariahs, Partners, Predators: German–Soviet Relations, 1922–1941, Columbia University Press, ISBN 978-0-231-10676-4
- Overy, R. J. (2004), The Dictators: Hitler's Germany and Stalin's Russia, W. W. Norton & Company, ISBN 978-0-393-02030-4
- Overy, Richard (1997), Why the Allies Won, W. W. Norton & Company, ISBN 978-0-393-31619-3
- Peden, G.C. (2007). Arms, Economics and British Strategy: From Dreadnoughts to Hydrogen Bombs. Cambridge University Press. ISBN 978-0-521-86748-1.
- Philbin III, Tobias R. (1994), The Lure of Neptune: German–Soviet Naval Collaboration and Ambitions, 1919–1941, University of South Carolina Press, ISBN 978-0-87249-992-8
- Rauschning, Hermann (2006). Hitler Speaks: A Series of Political Conversations With Adolf Hitler on His Real Aims. Kessinger Publishing. ISBN 1-4286-0034-5.
- Roberts, Geoffrey (1992). "Infamous Encounter? The Merekalov-Weizsäcker Meeting of 17 April 1939". The Historical Journal. 35 (4): 921–926. doi:10.1017/S0018246X00026224. JSTOR 2639445. S2CID 154228049.
- Roberts, Geoffrey (2006), Stalin's Wars: From World War to Cold War, 1939–1953, Yale University Press, ISBN 978-0-300-11204-7
- Senn, Alfred Erich (2007). Lithuania 1940 : revolution from above. Amsterdam, New York: Rodopi. ISBN 978-90-420-2225-6.
- Shirer, William L. (1990), The Rise and Fall of the Third Reich: A History of Nazi Germany, Simon and Schuster, ISBN 978-0-671-72868-7
- Spector, Robert Melvin (2004). World Without Civilization: Mass Murder and the Holocaust, History, and Analysis. UPA. ISBN 978-0761829638.
- Subrenat, Jean-Jacques, ed. (2004). Estonia: Identity and Independence. Translated by Cousins, David; Dickens, Eric; Harding, Alexander; Waterhouse, Richard C. Rodopi. ISBN 90-420-0890-3.
- Ulam, Adam Bruno (1989). Stalin: The Man and His Era. Beacon Press. ISBN 0-8070-7005-X.
- Weeks, Albert L. (2003). Stalin's Other War: Soviet Grand Strategy, 1939-1941. Rowman & Littlefield. ISBN 0-7425-2192-3.
- Wegner, Bernd (1997), From Peace to War: Germany, Soviet Russia, and the World, 1939–1941, Berghahn Books, ISBN 978-1-57181-882-9
- Weinberg, Gerhard (1970). The Foreign Policy of Hitler's Germany Diplomatic Revolution in Europe 1933-36. Chicago: University of Chicago Press.
- Weinberg, Gerhard L. (1995), A World at Arms: A Global History of World War II, Cambridge University Press, ISBN 978-0-521-55879-2
- Weizsäcker, Ernst von (April 17, 1939). "Memorandum by the State Secretary in the German Foreign Office - Weizsacker". The Avalon Project. Yale Law School.
- Wettig, Gerhard (2008). Stalin and the Cold War in Europe. Landham, Md: Rowman & Littlefield. ISBN 978-0-7425-5542-6.
- "Modern History Sourcebook:The Molotov-Ribbentrop Pact, 1939". Internet History Sourcebooks Project. Fordham University.
