= Jörg Echternkamp =

German military historian

- Born: October 3, 1963 (age 63); Herford, West Germany
- Occupations: Historian, author, editor

Academic background
- Education: Bielefeld University

Academic work
- Era: 20th century
- Institutions: Martin Luther University of Halle-Wittenberg; Military History Research Office (MGFA)
- Main interests: Early 20th century Europe, military history, historiography
- Notable works: Germany and the Second World War

Jörg Echternkamp (born October 3, 1963) is a German military historian, who specialises in the history of Nazi Germany and World War II. He is a lecturer in modern history at the Martin Luther University of Halle-Wittenberg and a research director at the Center for Military History and Social Sciences of the German Army (formerly the Military History Research Office (MGFA). His is a contributor and editor of the seminal series Germany and the Second World War from the MGFA.

== Historian of Nazi Germany ==
Echternkamp is contributor to two volumes of the Germany and the Second World War series. He served as the editor of volume IX/II: German Wartime Society 1939–1945: Exploitation, Interpretations, Exclusion. Reviewing the volume in the journal German History, historian Jeff Rutherford notes that it "maintains the extremely high standards set by previous volumes in the series. Each essay provides both an excellent summing up of the literature (at least until 2005) and some fresh insights based on archival research". In the final volume of the series, Echternkamp deals with the aftermath of World War II, "showing how Hitler's war shaped the lives of tens of millions of people beyond the capitulation of the Wehrmacht".

Echternkamp is the co-editor and the contributor to the 2007 volume of essays Die Politik der Nation: Deutscher Nationalismus in Krieg und Krisen 1760–1960 [The Politics of the Nation: German Nationalism in War and Crises 1760–196] where he explores the topic of German nationalism in the post-World War II period in both East Germany and West Germany. A review in H-Net finds this topic to be "the almost uncharted territory" and that Echternkamp finds that "the main proponents of a new national discourse were often conservative historians who had already been professionally active prior to the Nazi regime". Overall, the goal of editors was to investigate how the abstract notion of a "nation" was evidenced in real-world political aims and programs over the two centuries of German history.

== Works ==
=== In English ===
- Experience and memory: the Second World War in Europe, New York, Berghahn Books, 2010. With Stefan Martens.
- Germany and the Second World War
  - Vol. IX: Wartime Society 1939–1945 with Ralf Blank, Bernhard Chiari, Karola Fings, Jürgen Förster, Winfried Heinemann, Tobias Jersak, Armin Nolzen, Christoph Rass
  - Vol. X: Collapse 1945, with Werner Rahn, John Zimmermann (historian), Richard Lakowski, Manfred Zeidler, Horst Boog, Andreas Horst Boog, Rolf-Dieter Müller, Wilfried Loth, Michael Schwartz, Rüdiger Overmans

=== In German ===
- Der Aufstieg des deutschen Nationalismus 1770–1840. Campus Verlag, Frankfurt a.M. 1998, ISBN 3-593-35960-X.
- Kriegsschauplatz Deutschland 1945. Leben in Angst. Hoffnung auf Frieden. Verlag Ferdinand Schöningh, Paderborn 2006, ISBN 3-506-72892-X.
- Die 101 wichtigsten Fragen: Der Zweite Weltkrieg. C.H. Beck, München 2010, ISBN 978-3-406-59314-7 (chin. Taiwan 2012)
- Die Bundesrepublik Deutschland 1945/49-1969. (= Seminarbuch Geschichte). Ferdinand Schöningh Verlag / UTB, Paderborn 2013, ISBN 978-3-8252-3724-0.
- Soldaten im Nachkrieg. Historische Deutungskonflikte und westdeutsche Demokratisierung 1945-1955, De Gruyter Oldenbourg Verlag, München 2014, ISBN 978-3-11-035122-4.
