= Horst Boog =

German military historian

- Born: 5 January 1928; Merseburg, Weimar Germany
- Died: 8 January 2016 (aged 88); Freiburg im Breisgau, Germany
- Occupations: Historian, author, editor

Academic background
- Education: University of Heidelberg

Academic work
- Era: 20th century
- Institutions: Military History Research Office (MGFA)
- Main interests: military history, historiography
- Notable works: Germany and the Second World War

Horst Boog (5 January 1928 – 8 January 2016) was a German historian who specialised in the history of Nazi Germany and World War II. He was the research director at the Military History Research Office (MGFA). Boog was a contributor to several volumes of the seminal work Germany and the Second World War from the MGFA. He was an expert on the Luftwaffe and the German side of the aerial war in Europe during World War II.

Boog also wrote for the right-wing, nationalistic newspaper Junge Freiheit and became politically active in the context of debates about the Allied strategic bombing during World War II. Since the early 1990s almost all of his work concentrated on arguing that Nazi Germany did not start bombing of civilians.

== Education and career ==
Born in 1928 in Merseburg, Horst Boog grew up in Germany. In 1944, he joined the Hitler Youth and trained as a glider pilot. Towards the end of the war, he was drafted into the Volkssturm. Unable to secure a placement for university studies in the difficult economic conditions of post-war Germany, he attended a foreign-language school in Leipzig. Subsequently, Boog worked as a translator at the International Military Tribunal at Nuremberg. For the academic year 1949–50, he received a scholarship as an exchange student at Middlebury College in the United States, where he earned the degree of Bachelor of Arts in history and philosophy.

Returning from the U.S., Boog worked at the Federal Intelligence Service. He attended evening classes at the University of Stuttgart in 1950/51 and took unpaid time off to attend classes at the University of Heidelberg. In 1965 he earned his PhD under the guidance of Johannes Kühn at Heidelbeg; the topic of his dissertation was the career of Ernst Graf zu Reventlow (1869–1943), a German naval officer, journalist and Nazi politician. He died on 8 January 2016 in Freiburg.

== Military historian of Nazi Germany ==
Boog joined the Military History Research Office (MGFA) at Freiburg, where he became a senior research director. While at MGFA, Boog initiated the first scientific conference on the German air war of World War II. Boog contributed to several volumes of the seminal work Germany and the Second World War. Since the 1980s, he had been an internationally recognized expert on the Luftwaffe and on the laws of war, such as the right to war (jus ad bellum) and the law of war (jus in bello). In his works, Boog started to identify with the Luftwaffe and drew a distinction between the "brave Luftwaffe officers and their Nazi leaders", writing about "brave decisions and personal courage" of Wehrmacht General Staff in addition to strong condemnation of the Allies.

== Benda-Beckmann ==
Bas von Benda-Beckmann is critical of Boog, criticising him for stating the bombings of Guernica, Rotterdam and Warsaw were "tactical" attacks compared to the Allied strategic bombing raids during World War II, which Boog described "terror bombings". Beckmann wrote further that Boog asserted that remained the case only until 1942.

Professor Richard Overy argues the same case as Boog with respect to the German side, and the attacks on Warsaw, Rotterdam and Guernica. Overy notes that airmen were ordered to avoid civilians leaving the Polish capital. Another airpower scholar, James Corum argues the rules of warfare in 1937 permitted the attack on Guernica and that the town was a legitimate target in supporting ground forces. Corum argues that the Luftwaffe did not have a policy of so-called "terror bombing", where civilians and civilian infrastructure were targeted.

In his writings Benda-Beckmann claimed Boog aimed at portraying Allied bombings of Nazi Germany as equal to Nazi crimes. Boog also wrote for the right-wing, nationalistic newspaper Junge Freiheit and became politically active in the context of debates about the Allied strategic bombing during World War II.

In his later writings starting from mid-90s, Benda-Beckmann claimed Boog engaged in criticism of German guilt for Second World War, which he accused of "hypersensitivity" and claimed that just because Hitler was presented as "villain" not everything done in his name was presented as "wrong". Benda-Beckmann also claimed Boog asserted that it was Germany that was "victim" during Second World War air war and not everything done in Nazi Germany was "wrong" or "evil". In doing so he continued a narrative that presented Germans as suffering in Second World War and majority of Germans as "respectable".

== Works ==
=== In English ===
- Germany and the Second World War:
  - Vol. IV: The Attack on the Soviet Union, with Joachim Hoffmann, Ernst Klink, Rolf-Dieter Müller and Gerd R. Ueberschär
  - Vol. VI: The Global War 1941–1943, with Werner Rahn, Reinhard Stumpf (historian) and Bernd Wegner
  - Vol. VII: The Strategic Air War in Europe and the War in the West and East Asia 1943–1944/5, with Gerhard Krebs and Detlef Vogel

=== In German ===
- Graf Ernst zu Reventlow (1869–1943). Eine Studie zur Krise der deutschen Geschichte seit dem Ende des 19. Jahrhunderts. Dissertation, Universität Heidelberg, 1965.
- Die deutsche Luftwaffenführung 1935–1945. Führungsprobleme. Spitzengliederung. Generalstabsausbildung. Deutsche Verlags-Anstalt, Stuttgart 1982, ISBN 3-421-01905-3.

== Bibliography ==
- Benda-Beckmann, Bas von (2010). A German Catastrophe?: German Historians and the Allied Bombings, 1945–2010. Amsterdam: Amsterdam University Press. ISBN 978-90-5629-653-7.
- Corum, James (2008). Wolfram von Richthofen: Master of the German Air War. Lawrence: University Press of Kansas. ISBN 978-0-7006-1598-8.
- Corum, James S. (1997). The Luftwaffe: Creating the Operational Air War, 1918–1940. Lawrence, KN: University Press of Kansas. ISBN 978-0-7006-0836-2.
- Overy, Richard (2013). The Bombing War: Europe, 1939–1945. London: Penguin.
