= Germany and the Second World War =

13-volume work

Cover of the original German edition of volume 1

Germany and the Second World War (German: Das Deutsche Reich und der Zweite Weltkrieg) is a 12,000-page, 13-volume work published by the Deutsche Verlags-Anstalt (DVA), that took academics from the German Armed Forces Military History Research Office 30 years (1978-2008) to complete. The Clarendon Press began publishing the English translation in 1990, but the series was last added to in 2017 and no publication date has yet been announced for the final two.

== Contents ==
Germany and the Second World War is the English translation of the series, which Clarendon Press (an imprint of Oxford University Press) began publishing in 1990. By 2017, 11 of the 13 parts had been published at a rate of one every two-to-three years; but the final two parts, Volumes X/I and X/II, are still awaited, with no publication date announced, following the death of the main translation editor.

In the following table, the publication dates of the final two parts are yet to be announced by Oxford University Press. Their titles and number of pages are based on the German volumes and may change.

Vol.	Title	Authors	Translators	Publication date		Pages	ISBN
Vol.	Title	Authors	Translators	Original	English trans.	Pages	ISBN
I	The Build-up of German Aggression (Ursachen und Voraussetzungen der deutschen Kriegspolitik)	Wilhelm Deist, Manfred Messerschmidt, Hans-Erich Volkmann, Wolfram Wette	P. S. Falla, Dean S. McMurry, Ewald Osers	1979	1990	827	0-19-822866-X
II	Germany's Initial Conquests in Europe (Die Errichtung der Hegemonie auf dem europäischen Kontinent)	Klaus A. Maier, Horst Rohde, Bernd Stegemann, Hans Umbreit	Dean S. McMurry, Ewald Osers, P. S. Falla (translation editor)	1979	1991	459	0-19-822885-6
III	The Mediterranean, South-East Europe, and North Africa 1939–1942 (Der Mittelmeerraum und Südosteuropa 1940–1941: Von der "non belligeranza" Italiens bis zum Kriegseintritt der Vereinigten Staaten)	Gerhard Schreiber, Bernd Stegemann, Detlef Vogel	Dean S. McMurry, Ewald Osers, Louise Willmot, P. S. Falla (translation editor)	1984	1995	840	0-19-822884-8
IV	The Attack on the Soviet Union (Der Angriff auf die Sowjetunion)	Horst Boog, Jürgen Förster, Joachim Hoffmann, Ernst Klink, Rolf-Dieter Müller, Gerd R. Ueberschär	Dean S. McMurry, Ewald Osers, Louise Willmot	1983	1998	1396 (Note: The first English-language edition of Volume IV also included a separate spiral-bound book of 27 maps in German.)	0-19-822886-4
V/I	Organization and Mobilization of the German Sphere of Power: Wartime Administration, Economy, and Manpower Resources 1939–1941 (Organisation und Mobilisierung des deutschen Machtbereichs – Teilband 1: Kriegsverwaltung, Wirtschaft und personelle Ressourcen 1939 bis 1941)	Bernhard R. Kroener, Rolf-Dieter Müller, Hans Umbreit	John Brownjohn, Patricia Crampton, Ewald Osers, Louise Willmot	1988	2000	1253	0-19-822887-2
V/II	Organization and Mobilization of the German Sphere of Power: Wartime Administration, Economy, and Manpower Resources 1942–1944/5 (Organisation und Mobilisierung des deutschen Machtbereichs – Teilband 2: Kriegsverwaltung, Wirtschaft und personelle Ressourcen 1942 bis 1944/45)	Bernhard R. Kroener, Rolf-Dieter Müller, Hans Umbreit	Derry Cook-Radmore, Ewald Osers, Barry Smerin, Barbara Wilson	1999	2003	1183	0-19-820873-1
VI	The Global War (Der globale Krieg: Die Ausweitung zum Weltkrieg und der Wechsel der Initiative 1941 bis 1943)	Horst Boog, Werner Rahn, Reinhard Stumpf, Bernd Wegner	Ewald Osers, John Brownjohn, Patricia Crampton, Louise Willmot	1990	2001	1347	0-19-822888-0
VII	The Strategic Air War in Europe and the War in the West and East Asia 1943–1944/5 (Das Deutsche Reich in der Defensive Strategischer Luftkrieg in Europa, Krieg im Westen und in Ostasien 1943 bis 1944/45)	Horst Boog, Gerhard Krebs, Detlef Vogel	Derry Cook-Radmore, Francisca Garvie, Ewald Osers, Barry Smerin, Barbara Wilson	2001	2006	928	0-19-822889-9
VIII	The Eastern Front 1943–1944: The War in the East and on the Neighbouring Fronts (Das Deutsche Reich in der Defensive: Die Ostfront 1943/44 Der Krieg im Osten und an den Nebenfronten)	Karl-Heinz Frieser, Klaus Schmider, Klaus Schönherr, Gerhard Schreiber, Krisztián Ungváry, Bernd Wegner	Barry Smerin, Barbara Wilson	2007	2017	1408	978-0198723462
IX/I	German Wartime Society 1939–1945: Politicization, Disintegration, and the Struggle for Survival (Staat und Gesellschaft im Kriege: Die deutsche Kriegsgesellschaft 1939 bis 1945. Politisierung, Vernichtung, Überleben)	Ralf Blank, Jörg Echternkamp, Karola Fings, Jürgen Förster, Winfried Heinemann, Tobias Jersak, Armin Nolzen, Christoph Rass	Derry Cook-Radmore, Francisca Garvie, Ewald Osers, Barry Smerin, Barbara Wilson	2004	2008	1072	0-19928-277-3
IX/II	German Wartime Society 1939–1945: Exploitation, Interpretations, Exclusion (Staat und Gesellschaft im Kriege: Die deutsche Kriegsgesellschaft 1939 bis 1945. Ausbeutung, Deutungen, Ausgrenzung)	Bernhard Chiari, Jörg Echternkamp, et al.	Derry Cook-Radmore, et al.	2005	2014	1168	0-19-954296-1
X/I	The Collapse of Germany 1945 and the Results of the Second World War: The Destruction of the Wehrmacht (approximate title) (Der Zusammenbruch des Deutschen Reiches 1945 und die Folgen des Zweiten Weltkrieges – Teilbd. 1: Die militärische Niederwerfung der Wehrmacht)	Rolf-Dieter Müller, et al.	TBA	2008	TBA	1000 (approx.)	TBA
X/II	The Collapse of Germany 1945 and the Results of the Second World War: The Resolution of the Wehrmacht and the Consequences of the War (Der Zusammenbruch des Deutschen Reiches 1945 und die Folgen des Zweiten Weltkrieges – Teilbd. 2: Die Auflösung der Wehrmacht und die Auswirkungen des Krieges)	Rolf-Dieter Müller, et al.	TBA	2008	TBA	850 (approx.)	TBA

== See also ==
- History of the Second World War
