= Hitler's War in the East, 1941–1945 =

1997 book by Gerd R. Ueberschär

- Author: Rolf-Dieter Müller; Gerd R. Ueberschär
- Language: English
- Genre: History; historiography
- Publisher: Berghahn Books
- Publication date: 1997
- Publication place: United States
- Media type: Print
- ISBN: 978-1-84545-501-9

Hitler's War in the East, 1941−1945: A Critical Assessment is a 1997 book by the German historians Rolf-Dieter Müller and Gerd R. Ueberschär. It surveys the literature on the Soviet–German war of 1941−1945 from the German perspective. Writing in the introduction to the 2002 edition, Gerhard Weinberg describes the book as providing a broad coverage of the conflict, by "stressing ideological and political as well as more specifically military aspects". The book has been updated in subsequent editions, the latest having been issued in 2009.

== Structure ==
The book devotes most of its space to the (West) German literature regarding the Soviet–German war. The authors also cover publications by British and American historians, while noting some Soviet and East German works, which they treat with caution. Some space is devoted to publications issued in post-Soviet Eastern Europe.

The book is divided into five parts: Policy and Strategy; The Military Campaign; The Ideologically Motivated War of Annihilation in the East; The Occupation; and The Results of the War and Coming to Terms with Them. Each section begins with a historiographical essay and ends with a bibliography. One reviewer was "particularly impressed by Müller and Ueberschar's thorough treatment of the Holocaust and the German occupation of the Soviet Union" and the ensuing historiographical controversies.

== Reception ==
Dennis Showalter, in a review of the third (2009) edition for The Journal of Slavic Military Studies, describes the book as "the standard reference in the field" since its publication. It has been updated since 1997 with new sources that have been published through 2006. Frank Buscher of Aurora University praises the book for its accessibility and compelling presentation of historiography on the subject:

It not only underscores the authors' impressive knowledge of Hitler's war against the Soviet Union and the vast literature on that subject, but it also demonstrates that historiographical surveys can be both informative and lively. As such, it will be of great interest to specialists and non-specialists alike.

— Frank Buscher

According to Buscher in his review, the book as "a 'must-read' for anyone with an interest in the Second World War and particularly the Eastern Front".

== See also ==
- The Myth of the Eastern Front: The Nazi-Soviet War in American Popular Culture
- The Wehrmacht: History, Myth, Reality
