= Karola Fings =

German historian of modern age and author

Karola Fings (born 1962 in Leverkusen) is a German historian.

== Works ==
- Messelager Köln. Ein KZ-Außenlager im Zentrum der Stadt, Köln 1996.
- Fings, Karola (2005). Krieg, Gesellschaft und KZ: Himmlers SS-Baubrigaden (in German). Schöningh. ISBN 978-3-506-71334-6.
- Fings, Karola (2008) [2004]. "Slaves for the 'Home Front': War Society and Concentration Camps". German Wartime Society 1939-1945: Politicization, Disintegration, and the Struggle for Survival. Germany and the Second World War. Vol. IX/I. Clarendon Press. pp. 207–286. ISBN 978-0-19-160860-5.
- Fings, Karola (2019). Sinti und Roma: Geschichte einer Minderheit (in German). C.H.Beck. ISBN 978-3-406-73613-1.
