= Gerd R. Ueberschär =

German military historian (born 1943)

- Born: 18 August 1943 (age 83); Offenbach am Main, Germany
- Occupations: Historian, author, editor

Academic work
- Era: 20th century
- Institutions: University of Freiburg; German Federal Military Archive
- Main interests: military history, historiography
- Notable works: Germany and the Second World War; Hitler's War in the East 1941−1945: A Critical Assessment

Gerd R. Ueberschär (born 18 August 1943) is a German military historian who specialises in the history of Nazi Germany and World War II. He is one of the leading contributors to the series Germany and the Second World War and, together with Rolf-Dieter Müller, is the author of Hitler's War in the East 1941−1945: A Critical Assessment. Both works have been published in English translations.

== Education and career ==
Ueberschär obtained his doctorate in history from the Goethe University Frankfurt, where he subsequently worked as an assistant professor. Starting with 1986, Ueberschär was a lecturer at the University of Freiburg. From 1996 to 2008, he worked as a historian and archivist at the German Federal Military Archive in Freiburg.

== Historian of Nazi Germany ==
Ueberschär is an author and editor of numerous books on the history of National Socialism in Germany and the Second World War. He is one of the lead researchers on the seminal work Germany and the Second World War. Ueberschär edited the German-language volume containing 68 biographies of leading military men of Nazi Germany, Hitlers militärischer Elite [Hitler's Military Elite] published in 1998 and reissued in 2011.

Ueberschär also covered the topic of the German resistance to Nazism in his 2004 work on Claus von Stauffenberg, Stauffenberg. Der 20 Juli 1944 and the 2006 work Für ein anderes Deutschland. Der deutsche Widerstand gegen den NS-Staat 1933–1945 [For Better Germany. German Resistance to Nazism 1933–1945]. He concluded that conspirators' plans for the post-Hitler society were incompatible with today's understanding of democracy; the plotters were hoping for a "genuine national community": "They propagated the constitutional plans were very far from an open democratic society". He also edited the 2002 collected volume Der deutsche Widerstand gegen Hitler [German Resistance to Hitler].

== Works ==
=== In English ===
- Germany and the Second World War (contributor)
- With Rolf-Dieter Müller: Hitler's War in the East 1941−1945: A Critical Assessment (1997) ISBN 978-1-57181-068-7

=== In German ===
- With Wolfram Wette: Bomben und Legenden. Rombach, Freiburg i. Br. 1981, ISBN 3-7930-0292-6.
- With Rolf-Dieter Müller and Wolfram Wette: Wer zurückweicht wird erschossen! Dreisam, Freiburg i. Br. 1985, ISBN 3-89125-219-6.
- With Thomas Schnabel: Endlich Frieden! Das Kriegsende in Freiburg 1945. Schillinger, Freiburg i. Br. 1985, ISBN 3-89155-009-X.
- With Rolf-Dieter Müller: Deutschland am Abgrund. Verlag des Südkurier, Konstanz 1986, ISBN 3-87799-073-8.
- Freiburg im Luftkrieg. Mit einer Photodokumentation zur Zerstörung der Altstadt am 27. November 1944 von Hans Schadek. Ploetz, Freiburg i. Br. 1990, ISBN 3-87640-332-4.
- Generaloberst Franz Halder. Muster-Schmidt, Göttingen 1991, ISBN 3-7881-0138-5.
- With Rolf-Dieter Müller: Kriegsende 1945. Fischer, Frankfurt am Main 1994, ISBN 3-596-10837-3.
  - La fine del Terzo Reich. Translated by Marisa Margara. Mulino, Bologna 1995, ISBN 88-15-04853-7.
- With Rolf-Dieter Müller: Hitlers Krieg im Osten 1941–1945. Wissenschaftliche Buchgesellschaft, Darmstadt 2000, ISBN 3-534-14768-5.
  - Hitler's war in the East 1941–1945. Translated by Bruce D. Little. Berghahn Books, New York, Oxford 2002, ISBN 1-57181-293-8.
- With Winfried Vogel: Dienen und Verdienen. Hitlers Geschenke an seine Eliten. Fischer, Frankfurt am Main 1999, ISBN 3-10-086002-0.
- Stauffenberg. Der 20. Juli 1944. Fischer, Frankfurt am Main 2004, ISBN 3-10-086003-9.
- With Rolf-Dieter Müller: 1945. Das Ende des Krieges. Primus, Darmstadt 2005, ISBN 3-89678-266-5.
- Für ein anderes Deutschland. Der deutsche Widerstand gegen den NS-Staat 1933–1945. Fischer, Frankfurt am Main 2006, ISBN 3-596-13934-1.
