= Joachim Hoffmann =

German historian (1930–2002)

Joachim Hoffmann (1 December 1930 – 8 February 2002) was a German historian who was the academic director of the German Armed Forces Military History Research Office.

== Life ==
Joachim Hoffmann was born in Königsberg, East Prussia, in 1930. In the latter stages of World War II Hoffmann's family fled to western Germany to avoid the advancing Red Army. There the family settled in Berlin.

From 1951 Hoffmann studied modern history, eastern European history and comparative ethnology at the Free University of Berlin and University of Hamburg. In 1959 he received his PhD in history for his study Die Berliner Mission des Grafen Prokesch-Osten 1849–1852. From 1960 until 1995 Hoffmann was working in the German Armed Forces Military History Research Office, where his field of expertise was the "Armed Forces of the Soviet Union". In his later years he held the post of scientific director. After Hoffmann had retired in 1995, he continued to work as an independent author.

He died in Freiburg in February 2002.

== Work ==
Hoffmann published a number of books and articles mainly on the German-Soviet war (1941–1945). Most of his works were based on little-known topics like Deutsche und Kalmyken 1942 bis 1945 (Germans and the Kalmyk people) (1977), Die Ostlegionen 1941 bis 1943 (1981) and Kaukasien 1942/43: Das deutsche Heer und die Orientvölker der Sowjetunion (Caucasus 1942/43: The German army and the eastern peoples of the Soviet Union) (1991). Also in 1984 he published the book Die Geschichte der Wlassow-Armee (History of the Vlasov Army) (1984). A Russian version of the book was published by YMCA Press in 1990.

From the middle of the 1980s, Hoffmann was involved in the debate about alleged Soviet preparations for an attack on Germany since the summer of 1940. In 1995, right after he had retired, he published his work Stalins Vernichtungskrieg 1941–1945 ("Stalin's War of Extermination").

== Controversies ==
Hoffmann has been criticised by historians for his uncritical attitude to the Nazi regime, and its war in the Soviet Union. Most critics concentrate on his last book, Stalins Vernichtungskrieg 1941–1945 (Stalin's War of Extermination). In particular, his skepticism over the use of gas chambers to execute concentration camp inmates, as well as his claim that the death toll of six million Jews was a product of Soviet propaganda are both criticized. In 1996, the German Bundestag stated that scholars unanimously rejected claims in the book including Hoffmann's preventative war thesis, and his skepticism over of the death toll of roughly 1 million Jews at Auschwitz.

=== An expert witness on a trial of Holocaust denier Germar Rudolf ===
In 1995, Joachim Hoffmann served as an expert witness in a court. Wigbert Grabert published the anthology Grundlagen der Zeitgeschichte by Germar Rudolf, a Holocaust denier convicted of Volksverhetzung (incitement of the people), under his pseudonym "Ernst Gauss". Grabert was charged with this. Hoffmann prepared an expert opinion for Grabert's trial. The district court of Tübingen had the anthology confiscated for Holocaust denial and sentenced Grabert to a fine. Rudolf published Hoffmann's opinion in 1997 in the Holocaust-denying journal Vierteljahreshefte für freie Geschichtsforschung (VffG).

== Selected works ==
- Die Ostlegionen 1941 – 1943. Turkotartaren, Kaukasier, Wolgafinnen im deutschen Heer, 1976
- Deutsche und Kalmyken 1942 – 1945, 3. edition, 1977
- Der Angriff auf die Sowjetunion, in: Das Deutsche Reich und der Zweite Weltkrieg, mit Jürgen Förster; Horst Boog, 1987
- Kaukasien 1942/43. Das deutsche Heer und die Orientvölker der Sowjetunion, 1991
- "Die Angriffsvorbereitungen der Sowjetunion 1941", in: Zwei Wege nach Moskau. Vom Hitler-Stalin-Pakt bis zum "Unternehmen Barbarossa" , München und Zürich 1991
- Stalins Vernichtungskrieg 1941–1945, Herbig Verlag, [3rd edition] 1999 ISBN 3-7766-2079-X
  - Reviewed by R.C.Raack in Slavic Review Vol. 55, No. 2 (Summer, 1996), pp. 493–494
- Berlin Friedrichsfelde. Ein deutscher Nationalfriedhof, 2001
- Die Tragödie der 'Russischen Befreiungsarmee' 1944/45. Wlassow gegen Stalin, Herbig Verlag, 2003 ISBN 3-7766-2330-6
