= Rolf-Dieter Müller =

German military historian and political scientist

- Born: 9 December 1948 (age 77); Germany
- Occupations: Historian, author, editor

Academic work
- Era: 20th century
- Institutions: German Armed Forces Military History Research Office
- Main interests: Modern European history, military history, historiography
- Notable works: Germany and the Second World War; Hitler's War in the East 1941−1945

Rolf-Dieter Müller (born 9 December 1948) is a German military historian and political scientist, who has served as Scientific Director of the German Armed Forces Military History Research Office since 1999. Rolf-Dieter Müller is also a former professor of military history at Humboldt University.

Müller, in cooperation with German journalist Rudibert Kunz, is known for being the first historian to write about the use of chemical weapons in the Rif War in a 1990 book titled Giftgas Gegen Abd El Krim: Deutschland, Spanien und der Gaskrieg in Spanisch-Marokko, 1922-1927.

Müller was one of the lead researchers on the seminal work Germany and the Second World War.

== Works ==
=== In English ===
- Germany and the Second World War (contributor)
- Hitler's War in the East 1941−1945: A Critical Assessment (1997)
- The Unknown Eastern Front: The Wehrmacht and Hitler's Foreign Soldiers
- Hitler's Wehrmacht 1935-1945
- Enemy in the East: Hitler's Secret Plans to Invade the Soviet Union

=== In German ===
- Rolf-Dieter Müller (1990). Giftgas Gegen Abd El Krim: Deutschland, Spanien und der Gaskrieg in Spanisch-Marokko, 1922-1927 (in German). Rombach. ISBN 3-7930-0196-2.
