= Peter Lieb =

German military historian (born 1974)

- Born: 1974 (age 51–52); West Germany
- Occupations: Historian, author, military officer in the Bundeswehr
- Awards: Werner Hahlweg Prize, 2006

Academic background
- Education: LMU Munich

Academic work
- Era: 20th century
- Institutions: Institute of Contemporary History; German Historical Institute Paris; Royal Military Academy Sandhurst; Center for Military History and Social Sciences of the Bundeswehr
- Main interests: Modern European history, military history
- Website: Official profile

Peter Lieb (born 1974) is a German military historian who specializes in the history of Nazi Germany and World War II. He held positions at Institute of Contemporary History, Royal Military Academy Sandhurst and Center for Military History and Social Sciences of the Bundeswehr. Widely published in the field, Lieb specializes in the Western theatre of World War II.

== Education and career ==
Lieb holds a PhD from LMU Munich, where he researched the radicalization of warfare in the West in 1944. His dissertation was awarded the Werner Hahlweg Prize in 2006 and published in book form in 2007 as Konventioneller Krieg oder NS-Weltanschauungskrieg? Kriegführung und Partisanenbekämpfung in Frankreich 1943/44 ("Conventional war or Nazi ideological war? Warfare and Anti-partisan fighting in France 1943/44"). Lieb was then a researcher at the Institute of Contemporary History in Munich and the German Historical Institute in Paris. From 2005 to 2015, Lieb was a senior lecturer at the Department of War Studies, Royal Military Academy Sandhurst.

In 2015, Lieb joined the Center for Military History and Social Sciences of the Bundeswehr in Potsdam. He is a member of the Military History Working Group and the German Committee for the History of the Second World War. He also served as an expert witness at a war crimes trial of Josef Scheungraber in Munich in 2009.

== Historian of Nazi Germany ==
In his research, Lieb traces the German occupation policy and warfare in the Western theatre of war. He differentiates between the actions and motivations of the Wehrmacht and the SS. According to Lieb, the latter had led an ideological struggle, while the Wehrmacht was guided by its understanding of military expediency, but at the same time rarely protested against this division of tasks. Lieb's 2007 book, ''Konventioneller Krieg oder NS-Weltanschauungskrieg?, was positively reviewed. Sönke Neitzel praised it as an "exemplary investigation", while Roman Töppel of the Institute of Contemporary History described it as a "work which sets the standard on the history of the war in the West in 1943/44." The historian Armin Nolzen, on the other hand, found that Lieb had uncritically adopted "the perspective of the sources" and "underestimated the criminal role of the Wehrmacht in France".

== Selected works ==
=== In German ===
- Konventioneller Krieg oder NS-Weltanschauungskrieg? Kriegführung und Partisanenbekämpfung in Frankreich 1943/44 (= Quellen und Darstellungen zur Zeitgeschichte, Band 69). R. Oldenbourg Verlag, Munich 2007, ISBN 978-3-486-57992-5.
- With Christian Hartmann, Johannes Hürter, Dieter Pohl (historian): Der deutsche Krieg im Osten 1941–1944. Facetten einer Grenzüberschreitung (= Quellen und Darstellungen zur Zeitgeschichte, Vol. 76). R. Oldenbourg Verlag, Munich 2009, ISBN 978-3-486-59138-5.
- With Wolfram Dornik, Georgiy Kasianov, Hannes Leidinger, Alekseij Miller, Bogdan Musiał, Vasyl Rasevyc: Die Ukraine. Zwischen Selbstbestimmung und Fremdherrschaft 1917–1922 (= Veröffentlichungen des Ludwig-Boltzmann-Instituts für Kriegsfolgen-Forschung, Sonderband 13). Leykam Buchverlag, Graz 2011, ISBN 978-3-7011-0209-9.
- Unternehmen Overlord. Die Invasion in der Normandie und die Befreiung Westeuropas (= Beck'sche Reihe, 6129). Verlag C.H. Beck, Munich 2014, ISBN 978-3-406-66071-9. Federal Agency for Civic Education
- Editor, with Jan Erik Schulte, Bernd Wegner: Die Waffen-SS. Neue Forschungen (= War in History, Vol. 74). Verlag Ferdinand Schöningh, Paderborn 2014, ISBN 978-3-506-77383-8.
- Der Krieg in Nordafrika 1940-1943. Reclam, Ditzingen 2018, ISBN 978-3-15-011161-1.

=== In English ===
- Vercors 1944. Resistance in the French Alps. Osprey Publishing, Oxford 2012, ISBN 978-1-84908-698-1.
- Lieb, Peter (2014). "Rommel in Normandy". In I. F. W. Beckett (ed.). Rommel Reconsidered. Mechanicsburg, PA: Stackpole Books. ISBN 978-0-8117-1462-4.
