= Military History Working Group =

The Military History Working Group
- Arbeitskreis Militärgeschichte
- Formation: 1995
- Founded at: Germany
- Type: Professional association
- Purpose: Interdisciplinary war studies and military history
- Methods: Publication of War in History (book series) (Krieg in der Geschichte)
- Members: 500
- Key people: Wilhelm Deist, Chairman (1995–2002); Stig Förster, Chairman (2003–present)
- Main organ: Official website

The Military History Working Group (Arbeitskreis Militärgeschichte, AKM) is a German professional association and research network formed in 1995 in Freiburg. It focuses on the interdisciplinary war studies and military history.

The Group's activities are coordinated out of the Historical Institute of the University of Bern. Initially chaired by historian Wilhelm Deist, it is chaired by historian Stig Förster as of 2017. In cooperation with Verlag Ferdinand Schöningh, the association produces the War in History (book series) (Krieg in der Geschichte).

== Purpose and organisation ==
The Military History Working Group was founded in 1995. Wilhelm Deist, chief historian at the Military History Research Office (MGFA) was one of the founding members and, from 1995 to 2002, its chairman of the association. From 2002 to 2003, he was the honorary chairman of the association. Its intention, according to Jörg Echternkamp, is to "contribute to the development of this current and important field of historical science, which is hardly represented at universities in German-speaking universities".

The Group's scientific work integrates several areas of historical science are such as politics, government, economics, and social, cultural and gender history. In addition to the Working Group on Historical Peace Research and the Working Group on Military and Society in the Early Modern Period, it is one of the most important workplaces for military history in the German-speaking world.

The association currently has over 500 members, including historians such as Frank Becker (historian), Christoph Nübel, Markus Pöhlmann, Alaric Searle and Jens Westemeier. As of 2016, the organisation's chairman was Stig Förster. With 500 historians, it's one of the largest associations of this kind.

== Wilhelm Deist Prize for Military History ==
The Wilhelm Deist Prize for Military History, awarded by the association, recognises the research of young scientists in the field of military history. Established in 2006, it was named after Wilhelm Deist in his honour. The prize is awarded annually for outstanding contributions to historical sciences. Its recipients included Peter M. Quadflieg (2007) and Christoph Nübel (2008). Jury members include Stig Förster from the University of Bern and Sönke Neitzel from the University of Potsdam.

== War in History book series ==
The Military History Working Group, in cooperation with Verlag Ferdinand Schöningh, publishes War in History (book series) (Krieg in der Geschichte). The series is edited by historians Stig Förster of the University of Bern, Bernhard R. Kroener of the University of Potsdam, and Bernd Wegner of the Helmut Schmidt University. Select publications in the series include:

- Rüdiger Overmans (Ed.): In der Hand des Feindes. Kriegsgefangenschaft von der Antike bis zum Zweiten Weltkrieg. Böhlau, Köln u.a. 1999, ISBN 3-412-14998-5.
- Thomas Kühne, Benjamin Ziemann (Eds): Was ist Militärgeschichte? (Krieg in der Geschichte, Band 6). Schöningh, Paderborn u.a. 2000, ISBN 3-506-74475-5.
- Karen Hagemann, Stefanie Schüler-Springorum (Eds): Heimat – Front. Militär- und Geschlechterverhältnisse im Zeitalter der Weltkriege (Reihe Geschichte und Geschlechter, Band 35). Campus, Frankfurt am Main u.a. 2001, ISBN 3-593-36837-4.
- Günther Kronenbitter, Markus Pöhlmann, Dierk Walter (Eds): Besatzung. Funktion und Gestalt militärischer Fremdherrschaft von der Antike bis zum 20. Jahrhundert (Krieg in der Geschichte, Band 28). Schöningh, Paderborn 2006, ISBN 3-506-71736-7.
- Sönke Neitzel, Daniel Hohrath (Eds): Kriegsgreuel. Die Entgrenzung der Gewalt in kriegerischen Konflikten vom Mittelalter bis ins 20. Jahrhundert (Krieg in der Geschichte, Band 40). Schöningh, Paderborn 2008, ISBN 978-3-506-76375-4.
- Markus Pöhlmann, Ulrike Ludwig, John Zimmermann (historian) (Eds): Ehre und Pflichterfüllung als Codes militärischer Tugenden (Krieg in der Geschichte, Volume 69). Schöningh, Paderborn 2014, ISBN 978-3-506-77312-8.
- Kerstin von Lingen, Klaus Gestwa (Eds): Zwangsarbeit als Kriegsressource in Europa und Asien (Krieg in der Geschichte, Volume 77). Schöningh, Paderborn u.a. 2014, ISBN 978-3-506-77727-0.
- Jens Westemeier: Himmlers Krieger. Joachim Peiper und die Waffen-SS in Krieg und Nachkriegszeit (Krieg in der Geschichte, Volume 71). 2014, ISBN 978-3-506-77241-1.
