= Jens Westemeier =

German historian and author (born 1966)

- Born: 1966 (age 59–60); West Germany
- Occupations: Historian, author, military officer in the Bundeswehr
- Awards: Werner Hahlweg Prize, 2012

Academic background
- Education: University of Regensburg

Academic work
- Era: 20th century
- Institutions: Bundeswehr Centre of Military History and Social Sciences; University of Potsdam
- Main interests: Modern European history, military history, historiography

Jens Westemeier (born 1966) is a German historian and author who specialises in military history and the history of the Nazi era. He has published several books on topics relating to the Waffen-SS and its personnel and commanders.

In 2014, Westemeier researched the Waffen-SS past of the German romanist and academic Hans Robert Jauß leading to the re-evaluation of the latter's past. Westemeir's research also includes the representation of the German war effort in popular culture.

== Education and career ==
Westemeier was born in 1966 in Bad Berleburg, West Germany. After graduating from high school (Gymnasium), he served in the German Armed Forces (Bundeswehr) attaining the rank of Lieutenant Colonel in the German Special Forces. Westemeier served as a United Nations Military Observer, including in Yugoslavia, Kosovo and Afghanistan in the 1990s and 2000s.

Westemeier studied history and political sciences at the University of Regensburg, graduating in 1997. He then worked at the Bundeswehr Centre of Military History and Social Sciences (MGFA at that time), where he undertook research on Joachim Peiper, the former adjutant of Heinrich Himmler. In 2009, Westermeier received his Ph.D. at the Department of Military History / Cultural History of Violence at the Faculty of Philosophy at the University of Potsdam with his thesis Himmlers Krieger ("Himmler's Warrior"), a biography of Peiper. In 2012, Westermeier was awarded the Werner Hahlweg Prize, the award for achievements in military history. In 2014 Westemeier became a lecturer at the Historical Institute at the University of Potsdam.

== Historian of Nazi Germany ==
Reviewing Himmlers Krieger, historian and journalist Sven Felix Kellerhoff described Himmlers Krieger as a "brilliant biographical study". Historian Bastian Hein suggested that the book would "provide immunity against any myths about [Peiper's] Waffen-SS career." Westemeier has also conducted research on the SS-Junkerschule. He rejects the notion that the graduates of the SS schools were a military elite. According to Westemeier, the close networking among the graduates enabled them to successfully obtain positions in close proximity to Himmler and Hitler. Ideologically homogeneous, this group produced a number of later war criminals such as Peiper, Walter Reder, and Fritz Knoechlein. The network survived the end of the war and contributed to the creation of HIAG, the Waffen-SS lobby group which had a considerable impact on the image of the Waffen-SS in popular culture. Westemeir's research on the topic appeared in the 2014 collection of essays Die Waffen-SS. Neue Forschungen ("The Waffen-SS: New Research") edited by Bernd Wegner and Peter Lieb.

In 2014, the University of Konstanz commissioned Westemeir to examine the political past of the novelist Hans Robert Jauß. Westemeier's research demonstrated that Jauß was likely involved in war crimes (as a company commander in 1943 in a unit that later became known as the 33rd Waffen Grenadier Division) and that Jauß falsified documents and glossed over his autobiography. Westemeier expanded on his work to later publish the monograph Hans Robert Jauß. Jugend, Krieg und Internierung ("Hans Robert Jauss. Youth, war and internment").

Westemeier is a contributor to the Military History Working Group, the German association for interdisciplinary war studies and military history. In this capacity, he organised the 2016 conference "The Image of the German Landser in Popular Culture and Popular Science" (So war der deutsche Landser), supported by the Bundeswehr Centre of Military History and Social Sciences and the publishing house Verlag Ferdinand Schöningh. The conference presented new research on the representation of the German war effort in film, television, and popular literature, including by such authors as Franz Kurowski and Trevor James Constable. According to the recap of the conference in H-Soz-Kult, the conference has "impressively showed that even after 20 years following the controversial Wehrmacht Exhibition, it's still necessary to dispel the traditional myths". The reviewer also finds that the event "offered insights into new research approaches that counteract the spread of popular representations of the Wehrmacht".

== Books and monographs ==
=== In German ===
- Joachim Peiper (1915–1976). SS-Standartenführer. Eine Biographie (Soldatenschicksale des 20. Jahrhunderts als Geschichtsquelle. Bd. 14). Biblio-Verlag, Osnabrück 1996, ISBN 3-7648-2499-9. (2. veränderte Auflage 2004; 2. durchgesehene und veränderte Auflage 2006.
- Himmlers Krieger. Joachim Peiper und die Waffen-SS in Krieg und Nachkriegszeit (War in History (book series). Bd. 71). Hrsg. mit Unterstützung des Zentrums für Militärgeschichte und Sozialwissenschaften der Bundeswehr, Schöningh, Paderborn u.a. 2014, ISBN 978-3-506-77241-1.
- Jugend, Krieg und Internierung. Hans Robert Jauß, 12.12.1921 Göppingen – 01.03.1997 Konstanz. Wissenschaftliche Dokumentation. Online-Resource, Bibliothek der Universität Konstanz, Konstanz 2015 (online).
- Hans Robert Jauß. Jugend, Krieg und Internierung. Konstanz University Press, Konstanz 2016, ISBN 978-3-86253-082-3.
- As editor: "So war der deutsche Landser...": Das populäre Bild der Wehrmacht. Verlag Ferdinand Schöningh, 2019. ISBN 978-3-506-78770-5.

=== In English ===
- Joachim Peiper: A Biography of Himmler's SS Commander, Schiffer Publishing, 2007, ISBN 978-0764326592.

=== Contributions ===
- Leibstandarte SS Adolf Hitler, 1re SS-Panzerdivision. In: Jean-François Muracciole, Guillaume Piketty (Eds.): Encyclopédie de la Seconde Guerre mondiale. Electronic Resource, Éditions Robert Laffont, Paris 2015, ISBN 978-2-221-19175-0.
- Die Junkerschulgeneration. In: Jan Erik Schulte, Peter Lieb, Bernd Wegner (Eds.): Die Waffen-SS. Neue Forschungen (Krieg in der Geschichte. Bd. 74). Schöningh, Paderborn 2014, ISBN 978-3-506-77383-8, S. 269–285.
