= Dieter Pohl =

German historian

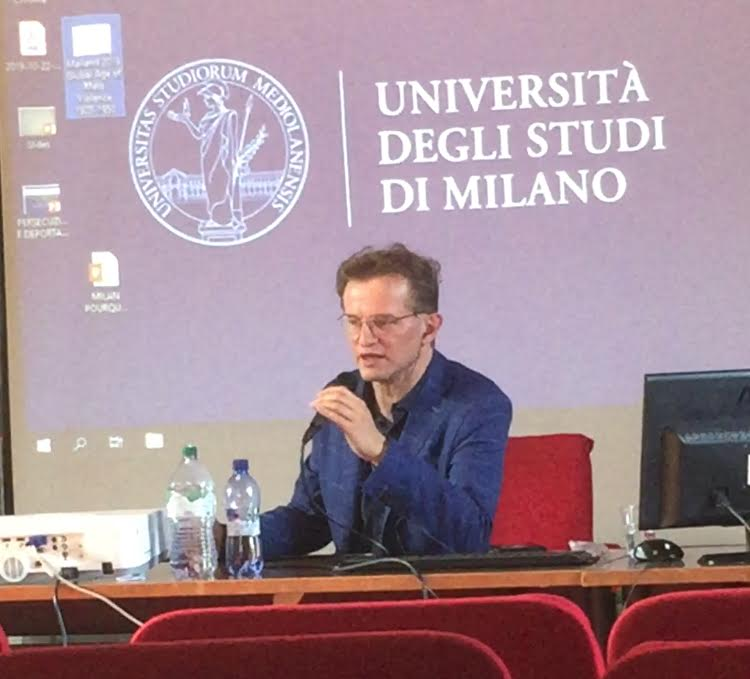
- Pohl lecturing at the University of Milan (2019)
- Born: 1964 (age 61–62); Germany
- Occupations: Historian, author

Academic background
- Education: LMU Munich

Academic work
- Era: 20th century
- Institutions: Munich Institute for Contemporary History; University of Klagenfurt
- Main interests: Modern European history

Dieter Pohl (born 1964) is a German historian and author who specialises in the Eastern European history and the history of mass violence in the 20th century.

== Education and career ==
Dieter Pohl studied history and political science at LMU Munich from 1984 to 1990, graduating with a Masters of Arts. Under the direction of Hans Günter Hockerts, he completed his PhD dissertation Nationalsozialistische Judenverfolgung in Ostgalizien 1941–1944 ("Nazi persecution of Jews in Eastern Galicia 1941-1944") in 1995. From 1995 to August 2010, Pohl was a researcher, and then a department head, at the Munich Institute for Contemporary History. Since September 2010, Pohl has served a professor of contemporary history at the Historical Institute at the University of Klagenfurt, with a focus on Eastern and Southeastern Europe. His main research interests include the history of the Soviet Union; the Second World War in Europe and Asia; the history of communist systems after 1945; mass violence in the 20th century; Nazi occupations and violent crimes; and the contemporary history of Poland and Ukraine.

Pohl served as an expert witness during the 2009 trial of John Demjanjuk, a former guard at the Sobibor extermination camp. Pohl testified that Sobibor was a death camp, the sole purpose of which was the killing of Jews, and that all Trawniki men had been generalists involved in guarding the prisoners as well as other duties. Therefore, if Demjanjuk was a Trawniki man at Sobibor, he had necessarily been involved in sending the prisoners to their deaths and was an accessory to murder. Pohl's testimony, along with that of other historians', proved decisive in securing a conviction.

Pohl is a member of the office of the International Committee for the History of the Second World War. He serves on the advisory board of the Kyiv-based journal Holocaust and Modernity / Holokost i suchasnistʹ ("Голокост і сучасність").

== Publications ==
- As editor with Tanja Sebta: Zwangsarbeit in Hitlers Europa. Besatzung, Arbeit, Folgen. Metropol, Berlin 2013, ISBN 978-3-86331-129-2.
- With Christian Hartmann, Johannes Hürter, Peter Lieb: Der deutsche Krieg im Osten 1941–1944. Facetten einer Grenzüberschreitung (= Quellen und Darstellungen zur Zeitgeschichte. Bd. 76). Oldenbourg, München 2009, ISBN 978-3-486-59138-5.
- Die Herrschaft der Wehrmacht. Deutsche Militärbesatzung und einheimische Bevölkerung in der Sowjetunion 1941–1944 (= Quellen und Darstellungen zur Zeitgeschichte. Bd. 71). Oldenbourg, München 2008, ISBN 978-3-486-58065-5 (Zugleich: München, Universität, Habilitations-Schrift, 2007; Taschenbuchausgabe (= Fischer 18858 Die Zeit des Nationalsozialismus). Fischer-Taschenbuch-Verlag, Frankfurt am Main 2011, ISBN 978-3-596-18858-1).
- With Frank Bajohr: Der Holocaust als offenes Geheimnis. Die Deutschen, die NS-Führung und die Alliierten. Beck, München 2006, ISBN 3-406-54978-0 (Taschenbuchausgabe als: Massenmord und schlechtes Gewissen. Die deutsche Bevölkerung, die NS-Führung und der Holocaust (= Fischer 17706 Die Zeit des Nationalsozialismus). Fischer-Taschenbuch-Verlag, Frankfurt am Main 2008, ISBN 978-3-596-17706-6).
- Verfolgung und Massenmord in der NS-Zeit 1933–1945. Wissenschaftliche Buchgesellschaft, Darmstadt 2003, ISBN 978-3-534-15158-5 (3., bibliographisch aktualisierte Auflage. ebenda 2011, ISBN 978-3-534-24026-5).
- Justiz in Brandenburg 1945–1955. Gleichschaltung und Anpassung (= Quellen und Darstellungen zur Zeitgeschichte. Bd. 50). Oldenbourg, München 2001, ISBN 3-486-56532-X.
- Holocaust. Die Ursachen, das Geschehen, die Folgen (= Herder-Spektrum. 4835). Herder, Freiburg (Breisgau) u. a. 2000, ISBN 3-451-04835-3 (In niederländischer Sprache: Holocaust. Massale moord op de Europese joden. Verbum, Laren NH 2005, ISBN 90-808858-1-9).
- Nationalsozialistische Judenverfolgung in Ostgalizien 1941–1944. Organisation und Durchführung eines staatlichen Massenverbrechens (= Studien zur Zeitgeschichte. Bd. 50). Oldenbourg, München u. a. 1996, ISBN 3-486-56233-9 (Zugleich: München, Universität, Dissertation, 1994). Full text online (in German).
- Von der „Judenpolitik“ zum Judenmord. Der Distrikt Lublin des Generalgouvernements 1939–1944 (= Münchner Studien zur neueren und neuesten Geschichte. Bd. 3). Lang, Frankfurt am Main u. a. 1993, ISBN 3-631-45716-2.

=== Essays and Book Chapters ===
- "Introduction", in: Vasily Grossman: Die Hölle von Treblinka, Wien 2020 (=VWI-Studienreihe Band 5), ISBN 978-3-7003-2177-4, S. 5–19
- Hans Krueger and the Murder of the Jews in the Stanislawow Region (Galicia). In: Yad Vashem Studies. Bd. 26, 1998, ISSN 0084-3296, S. 239–264. Online (PDF).
