= Schöningh =

Schöningh may refer to:

- Ferdinand Schöningh (1815-1883), German bookseller, publisher and newspaper founder
- Verlag Ferdinand Schöningh, German book publishing company
