= Christian Hartmann =

German historian (born 1959)

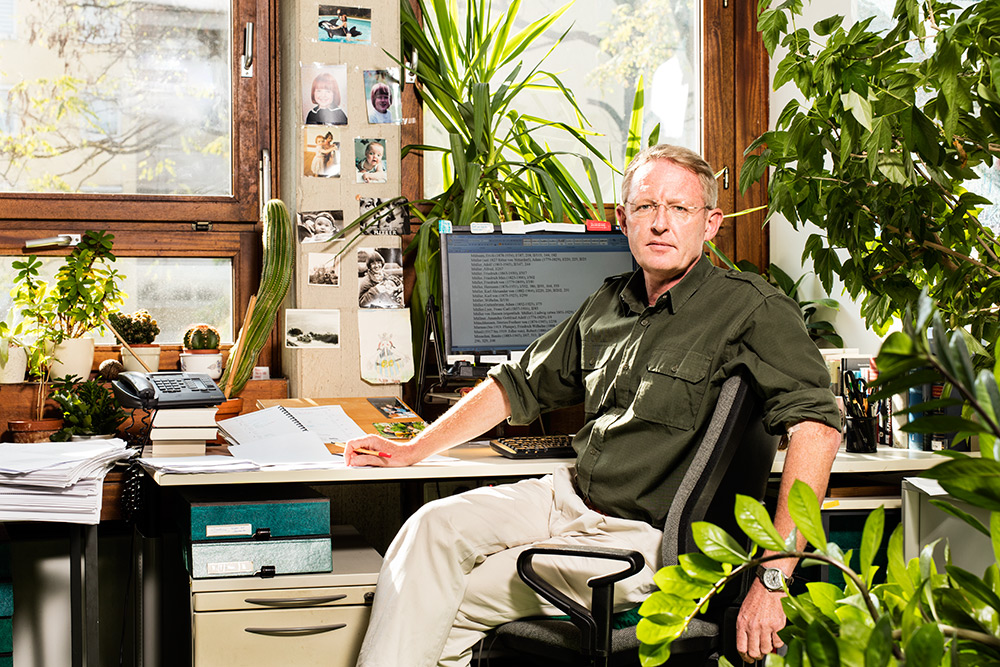
- Hartmann in 2015
- Born: 15 April 1959 (age 67); Heidelberg, West Germany
- Occupations: Historian, author, editor

Academic work
- Era: 20th century
- Institutions: Institute of Contemporary History (Munich); Bundeswehr Command and Staff College
- Main interests: Modern European history, history of international relations, military history, historiography
- Notable works: Books on the history of Nazi Germany

Christian Hartmann (born 15 April 1959) is a German historian. He is a research fellow at the Institute of Contemporary History (Institut für Zeitgeschichte) in Munich.

== Life and work ==
Hartmann grew up in Tübingen. In 1981, he worked in the Tel Joseph kibbutz in Israel. Following his compulsory military service, he studied history, German and sport at the universities of Tübingen, Cologne and Freiburg. He completed his university studies in 1986 with the First State Exam for grammar school teaching. In 1989, he completed his PhD in Cologne with a thesis on General Franz Halder, chief of the General Staff of the German Army, 1938–1942. His doctoral supervisor was Andreas Hillgruber.

From 1990 to 1991, Hartmann worked as a consultant at the Political Archives of the German Foreign Office in Bonn, where he was a member of the international historical commission on the Akten zur deutschen auswärtigen Politik 1918–1945. In 1992, he was seconded for a year to the Brandenburg Ministry of Science, Research and Culture in Potsdam, where he worked as a consultant.

Since 1993, Hartmann has been research fellow at the Institute of Contemporary History in Munich/Berlin, where he was, among other functions, deputy editor-in-chief of the journal Vierteljahrshefte für Zeitgeschichte from 1998 to 2012 and director of the research project 'Wehrmacht in der nationalsozialistischen Diktatur 1933–1945’ (The Wehrmacht in the National Socialist dictatorship, 1933–1945) from 1999 to 2009, from which his study Wehrmacht im Ostkrieg also emerged and which was concluded with the edited collection Der deutsche Krieg im Osten 1941–1944. From March 2012 to May 2015, Hartmann was project supervisor of the critical edition of Adolf Hitler’s work Mein Kampf.

From 2004 to 2009, Hartmann was furthermore visiting lecturer at the University of the Bundeswehr in Munich. As a lieutenant colonel of the reserve, he is currently lecturer at the Bundeswehr Command and Staff College in Hamburg. In 2016/17, he was deployed in Mali as Strategic Advisor for the European Union Training Mission.

In addition, Hartmann often advises historical films and documentaries, including War of the Century (UK, 1999), Enemy at the Gates (Germany/France, 2001), Der Untergang (Germany, 2004), Sophie Scholl – Die letzten Tage (Germany, 2005), Napola – Elite für den Führer (Germany, 2004), Tagebuch eines Lagerkommandanten (Germany, 2011), Unsere Mütter, unsere Väter (Germany, 2013) and The Book Thief (US/UK, 2014). He is furthermore on the academic advisory board of the television channel History.

His academic focal points are military history, the history of international relations, German history and European history.

== Awards ==
- 1992: Werner Hahlweg Prize for Military History and Military Science (3rd prize)
- 2016: Academic Prize: Society Needs Science

== Publications (selection) ==
As author:

- Halder. Generalstabschef Hitlers 1938–1942. Schöningh, Paderborn 1991, ISBN 3-506-77484-0 (= doctoral thesis, University of Cologne, 1989); 2nd, expanded and updated edition 2010, ISBN 978-3-506-76762-2.
- with Johannes Hürter: Die letzten 100 Tage des Zweiten Weltkriegs. Droemer, Munich 2005, ISBN 3-426-27356-X.
- Wehrmacht im Ostkrieg. Front und militärisches Hinterland 1941/42 (= Quellen und Darstellungen zur Zeitgeschichte, vol. 75). Oldenbourg, Munich 2009; 2nd edition 2010, ISBN 978-3-486-70225-5.
- Unternehmen Barbarossa. Der deutsche Krieg im Osten 1941–1945 (= Beck’sche Reihe Wissen, vol. 2714). Beck, Munich 2011, 2nd, revised edition 2012, ISBN 978-3-406-61226-8 (Romanian translation 2012, English translation 2013, paperback 2018, Polish translation 2014, Spanish translation 2018).
- Operation Barbarossa: Nazi Germany's War in the East, 1941-1945 Oxford University Press

As editor:

- Akten zur Deutschen Auswärtigen Politik 1918–1945. Aus dem Archiv des Auswärtigen Amts, various sub-volumes. Vandenhoeck und Ruprecht, Göttingen 1990 ff.
- Hitler. Reden, Schriften, Anordnungen. Februar 1925 bis Januar 1933, various sub-volumes. Saur, Munich 1995 ff., ISBN 3-598-21930-X.
- with Johannes Hürter and Ulrike Jureit: Verbrechen der Wehrmacht. Bilanz einer Debatte. Beck, Munich 2005, 2nd edition 2014, ISBN 3-406-52802-3.
- Von Feldherren und Gefreiten. Zur biographischen Dimension des Zweiten Weltkriegs. Oldenbourg, Munich 2008, ISBN 978-3-486-58144-7.
- with Johannes Hürter, Peter Lieb and Dieter Pohl: Der deutsche Krieg im Osten 1941–1944. Facetten einer Grenzüberschreitung (= Quellen und Darstellungen zur Zeitgeschichte, vol. 76). Oldenbourg, Munich 2009, ISBN 978-3-486-59138-5.
- with Thomas Vordermayer, Othmar Plöckinger and Roman Töppel: Hitler, Mein Kampf. Eine kritische Edition. 2 vols., with the assistance of Pascal Trees, Angelika Reizle and Martina Seewald-Mooser. Commissioned by the Institute of Contemporary History Munich – Berlin, 8th, reviewed edition, Institute of Contemporary History, Berlin 2018, ISBN 978-3-9814052-3-1. (first place on the Spiegel bestseller list from 16 to 29 April 2016)
