= Prize for Military History =

Prize for Military History and Sciences
- Awarded for: Contributions in military history and history of military technology
- Country: Germany
- Presented by: Federal Office of Bundeswehr Equipment, Information Technology and In-Service Support
- Reward: Prize money of 20,000 euros
- First award: 1992; 34 years ago
- Number of laureates: 43 as of 2012

Prize for Military History (Förderpreis für Militärgeschichte und Militärtechnikgeschichte) is an award recognising achievements in the fields of military history and history of military technology. The prize is bestowed by the German Ministry of Defence every two years.

== History ==
From 1992 to 2012, the prize was awarded under the name Werner Hahlweg Prize. From 1969 until his retirement in 1978, the German historian Werner Hahlweg (1912–1989) held a professorship in Military History and Military Sciences at the University of Münster. In his will, he bequeathed funds to go towards a science award for military history. The prize was administered by the Federal Office of Defense Technology and Procurement in Koblenz (now Federal Office of Bundeswehr Equipment, Information Technology and In-Service Support, part of the German Ministry of Defence). After it had become known in 2012 that the prize's namesake, Hahlweg, had joined the SS in June 1933 and the Nazi Party in 1936, the Ministry of Defence decided to suspend the prize. It was reinstituted in 2017 under a new name and continues to be awarded every two years.

== Advisory board ==
As of 2018, the advisory board includes Michael Epkenhans (Center for Military History and Social Sciences of the Bundeswehr), Marian Füssel (University of Göttingen), Johannes Hürter (Institute of Contemporary History (Munich)), and Brendan Simms (Oxford University), among others. It is chaired by the historian Sönke Neitzel (University of Potsdam).

== Recipients ==
- 1992: Dieter Storz; Christian Lankes; Christian Hartmann
- 1994: Olaf Rose; Ralf Pröve; Karl-Klaus Weber
- 1996: Axel F. Gablik; Michael Sikora; Sönke Neitzel; Gerhard Quaas
- 1998: Lutz Budraß; Oliver Gnad; Lothar Walmrath
- 2000: Matthias Rogg; Frank Becker (historian) and Martin Rink; Carola Vogel and Michael Busch (historian)
- 2002: Rainer Leng; Markus Pöhlmann and Brigitte Biwald; Christian Th. Müller
- 2004: Uwe Tresp; Elmar Heinz; Klaus-Jürgen Bremm and Klaus Jochen Arnold
- 2006: Jörn Leonhard; Stefan Kroll; Werner Benecke and Frank Pauli
- 2008: Oliver Stein; Eckard Michels and Christian Ortner; Philipp Münch
- 2010: Tanja Bührer; Rüdiger Bergien and Christian Kehrt; Martin Clauss and Wencke Meteling
- 2012: Christoph Nübel; Jens Westemeier; Florian Seiller and Jürgen Kilian
- 2017: Flavio Eichmann; Carmen Winkel and Takuma W. Melber; Peter Keller and Jonas Friedrich

== See also ==
- List of history awards
