= Jörn Leonhard =

German historian

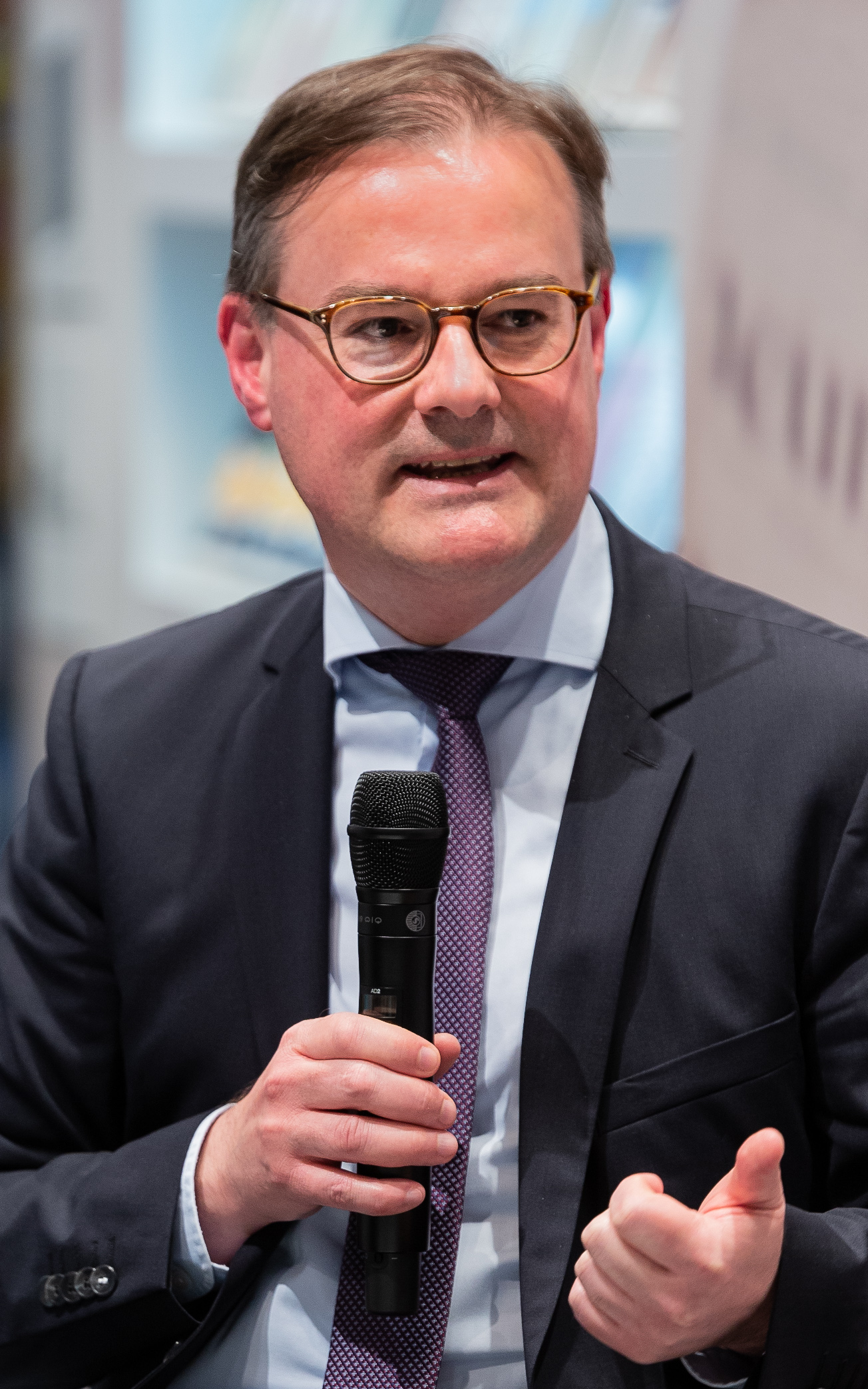
Jörn Leonard at the Frankfurt Book Fair of 2018

Jörn Leonhard (born 27 May 1967 in Birkenfeld) is a historian and professor of Western European History at the History Department of the University of Freiburg since 2006. From 2007 to 2012, he was co-director of the School of History at the Freiburg Institute for Advanced Studies (FRIAS). His published works focus on the history of liberalism, nationalism, empires and wars. Leonhard has received several important research awards. His books “Die Büchse der Pandora” (2014) as well as “Der Überforderte Frieden” (2018) established him as an important representative in the research of global history.

== Academic career ==
After graduating from the Eleonorenschule Darmstadt in 1986, Leonhard studied history, political science and German studies at the University of Heidelberg and the University of Oxford from 1987 to 1994 as a scholarship holder of the German National Academic Foundation. He completed his studies with a Master of Studies degree in Modern History at Oxford in 1992 and a Magister Artium at Heidelberg in 1994.

He then received a doctoral scholarship from the Studienstiftung des deutschen Volkes (German National Academic Foundation) and was awarded a doctorate in 1998 by Volker Sellin in Heidelberg for his dissertation Liberalismus. Zur historischen Semantik eines europäischen Deutungsmusters. He received the Wolf-Erich-Kellner-Preis and the Research Prize of the German Historical Institute in London for the dissertation.

From 1998 to 2003, Leonhard was a fellow and tutor in Modern History at Wadham College, University of Oxford, and a DAAD subject lecturer in Modern German history and European History. From 2003 to 2004, he received a one-year scholarship from the Historisches Kolleg in Munich to complete his habilitation. In 2004, he habilitated in Heidelberg with the thesis Bellizismus und Nation. Kriegsdeutung und Nationsbestimmung in Europa und den Vereinigten Staaten 1750–1914. For his habilitation thesis, he was awarded a prize in the "Historical Book of the Year 2008" competition in the category of modern history and received the Werner Hahlweg Research Prize.

From 2004 to 2006, he held the Friedrich Schiller University Lectureship in European History at the Institute of History of the University of Jena. Since 2006, he has been Professor and Head of Chair of Modern and Contemporary Western European History at the Department of History at the University of Freiburg. In 2007, Leonhard founded the School of History at the Freiburg Institute for Advanced Studies together with Ulrich Herbert, which they both directed until 2012. In 2012/13 he took up a research professorship at the Minda de Gunzburg Centre for European Studies at Harvard University. He turned down calls to the University of Jena (2006 and 2015), to the Humboldt University of Berlin (2010) and to the directorship of the Institute for Advanced Study in the Humanities in Essen, as well as a professorship at the Ruhr University Bochum (2017).

In 2014, he published a monography on the history of the First World War called Die Büchse der Pandora (Pandora's Box). According to Michael Epkenhans, it is "the best book that has come onto the market so far". Hans-Ulrich Wehler called this work "the most important book on the First World War", saying that it marked the "beginning of a new epoch in World War history". Adam Tooze, however, noted that the book needed "more critical distance from the contemporary witnesses to the disasters of the 20th century". Leonhard's book received, among others, the NDR Non-Fiction Book Prize, the Humanities International Prize and the Norman B. Tomlinson Jr. Prize of the World War One Historical Association. Harvard University Press published an English translation in 2018.

In the 2016/17 academic year, Leonhard was awarded the research fellowship of the Institute of Contemporary History at the Historisches Kolleg Munich for his monography Der überforderte Frieden. Versailles und die Welt 1918–1923 (The Overburdened Peace. Competing Visions of World Order in 1918/19), which was published in autumn 2018. Dirk Kurbjuweit from SPIEGEL called Leonhard the winner of the day for his book, and said that the book had been “the very great work of history that helps in understanding the present.". In Deutschlandfunk, Jörg Himmelreich called it a "brilliant global-historical account of the preconditions and, above all, the global consequences of these treaties." Marcus M. Payk stated that no second attempt for a comparable comprehensive historical account about the end of World War I is likely to be attempted in the near future. After just a short time, Leonhard's book was already described as a standard work.

Leonhard was involved as Principal Investigator and board member in the DFG Collaborative Research Centre 948 "Heroes, Heroizations, Heroisms" and is currently a member of the DFG Research Training Group 2571 "Empires: Dynamic Change, Temporality and Post-Imperial Orders" at the University of Freiburg.

Since 2023, Leonhard has been a member of the editorial board of the renowned journal Vierteljahrshefte für Zeitgeschichte.

== Research fields ==
In his research, Leonhard deals with the history of Europe and the world between the end of the 18th century and the 20th century using the methodological triads of comparison, transfer and histoire croisée. In his conceptual approaches, he has dealt intensively with comparative historical semantics, the history of discourse, experience and argumentation. Thematic foci are the history of liberalism and nationalism, of war and peace, and the study of multi-ethnic empires in the 19th and early 20th centuries.

== Research prizes, fellowships, guest professorships, awards and honours ==
- 1992: German History Prize, University of Oxford
- 1998: Research Prize of the German Historical Institute London for the dissertation Liberalismus. Zur historischen Semantik eines europäischen Deutungsmusters
- 1999: Wolf-Erich-Kellner research prize for the dissertation Liberalismus. Zur historischen Semantik eines europäischen Deutungsmusters
- 2001: Visiting Research Fellowship of the Alexander-von-Humboldt-Foundation at the German-American Center for Visiting Scholars, Washington D.C.
- 2002: Elected Fellow of the Royal Historical Society London (F.R.Hist.S.)
- 2003–2004: Junior-Fellowship (scholarship holder) of the Historischen Kollegs Munich
- 2006: Werner-Hahlweg-Forschungspreis (first prize) for the habilitation Bellizismus und Nation – Kriegsdeutung und Nationsbestimmung in Europa und den Vereinigten Staaten 1750–1914
- 2009: Invitation to a visiting professorship at the École des Hautes Études en Sciences Sociales in Paris
- 2009: Award winner in the competition „historical book of the year 2008“ in the category Modern history (HSozKult) with the habilitation “Bellizismus und Nation – Kriegsdeutung und Nationsbestimmung in Europa und den Vereinigten Staaten 1750-1914"
- 2010: State Research Prize Baden-Württemberg for 2009
- 2012/13: Visiting Research Fellowship, Minda de Gunzburg Center for European Studies, Harvard University
- 2014: NDR Culture Non-fiction Prize for "Pandora’s Box - History of the First World War"
- 2015: Humanities International Prize for the promotion of excellent publications in the humanities and social sciences by the German Publishers and Booksellers Association, Fritz Thyssen Foundation, VG Wort and the German Foreign Office for the monograph “Pandora’s Box. History of the First World War”
- 2015: Elected full member of the Heidelberg Academy of Sciences and Humanities
- 2016/17: Senior Fellowship at the Historisches Kolleg Munich (research fellowship of the Institute of Contemporary History at the Historisches Kolleg) for the book project "The Overburdened Peace. Competing visions of world order in 1918–1919".
- 2018: Norman B. Tomlinson Jr. Prize by the World War One Historical Association „for the best work in English on World War One“
- 2019: Elected for as Honorary Fellow for Life, Wadham College, University of Oxford
- 2021: Acceptance of an Opus Magnum-funding from the Volkswagen Foundation for the book project "World Crisis of 1918–1939/41" for three research semesters from Winter semester 2022/23 onwards

== Selected memberships ==
- Scientific Advisory Board of "Contributions to the History of Concepts" since 2005
- International Scientific Advisory Board of the "Ricerche di Storia Politica" (Bologna) since 2005
- Association for Constitutional History since 2006
- France Centre of the University of Freiburg since 2006, member of the board from 2010 to 2016
- Scientific Advisory Board of the Stiftung Bundespräsident-Theodor-Heuss-Haus Stuttgart 2006 to 2017
- Selection Committee of the German National Academic Foundation since 2008
- Lecturer of the German Academic Scholarship Foundation at the University of Freiburg 2008–2018
- Scientific Advisory Board of the German Historical Institute Paris 2010-2017 (2015 to 2017 as deputy chairman)
- Scientific member and Principal Investigator in the German Graduate School 1767 "Factual and Fictional Narration" at the University of Freiburg 2011–2016
- Scientific Advisory Board of the Istituto Storico Italiano-Tedesco, Trento, 2011–2016
- Member and sub-project leader in the Collaborative Research Centre 948 "Heroes, Heroizations, Heroisms" at the University of Freiburg 2012–2020, member of the board 2012–2016
- Scientific Advisory Board of the German Archive for Diaries, Emmendingen since 2013
- Scientific Advisory Board for the Award of the Science Prize of the German Bundestag 2014–2017
- Selection Committee for Research Awards of the Alexander von Humboldt-Foundation since 2015
- Monument Council of the State of Baden-Württemberg since 2015
- Member of the DFG Senate Committee for the Collaborative Research Centres and Scientific Member of the DFG Grants Committee for Collaborative Research Centres for two terms since 2017
- Scientific Advisory Board of the House of History Baden-Württemberg in Stuttgart since 2019
- Scientific Advisory Board of the German Historical Institute London since 2020
- Member and Principal Investigator in the DFG Graduate School 2571 "Empires: Dynamic Change, Temporality and Post-Imperial Orders" at the University of Freiburg since 2020
- Member of the Nietzsche Research Center at the University of Freiburg since 2020
- Member of the Africa Center for Transregional Research (ACT) at the University of Freiburg since 2021

== Selected bibliography ==
=== Monographs ===
- 2001. Liberalismus – Zur historischen Semantik eines europäischen Deutungsmusters, Oldenbourg.
- 2008. Bellizismus und Nation – Kriegsdeutung und Nationsbestimmung in Europa und den Vereinigten Staaten 1750–1914, Oldenbourg.
- 2010. Empires und Nationalstaaten im 19. Jahrhundert, co-authored with Ulrike von Hirschhausen, Vandenhoeck & Ruprecht.
- 2014. Die Büchse der Pandora: Geschichte des Ersten Weltkriegs, C.H. Beck, translated to English (Patrick Camiller),
- 2018. Pandora's Box, A History of the First World War, Belknap/Harvard.
- 2018. Der überforderte Frieden. Versailles und die Welt, 1918–1923, C.H. Beck.
- 2023. Empires – Eine globale Geschichte 1780–1920, co-authored with Ulrike von Hischhausen, C.H. Beck.

=== Edited volumes ===
- 2001. (co-ed). Nationalismen in Europa: West- und Osteuropa im Vergleich, Wallstein.
- 2002. (co-ed). Ten years of German Unification. Transfer, Transformation, Incorporation, Birmingham UP.
- 2010. (co-ed). Comparing Empires: Encounters and Transfers in the Long Nineteenth Century, Vandenhoek & Ruprecht, ISBN 978-3-525-31040-3
- 2010. (co-ed). Koloniale Vergangenheiten – (post-)imperiale Gegenwart. Vortragreihe im Rahmen des Jubiläums „550 Jahre Albert-Ludwigs-Universität“, Sommersemester 2007 und Wintersemester 2007/08 in Kooperation mit dem Historischen Seminar und dem Romanischen Seminar der Universität (= Studien des Frankreich-Zentrums der Albert-Ludwigs-Universität Freiburg. Band 19). Berliner Wissenschafts-Verlag.
- 2011. (co-ed). What Makes the Nobility Noble? Comparative Perspectives from the Sixteenth to the Twentieth Century, Vandenhoeck & Ruprecht.
- 2014. (co-ed). Christoph Strauß: Menschen im Krieg 1914–1918 am Oberrhein. Kolloquium zur gleichnamigen Ausstellung/Vivre en temps de guerre des deux côtes du Rhin 1914–1918; deutsch/französisch. Kohlhammer, Stuttgart.
- 2015. (ed.). Vergleich und Verflechtung. Deutschland und Frankreich im 20. Jahrhundert, Erich Schmidt Verlag.
- 2015. (co-ed). Liberalismus im 20. Jahrhundert, Steiner Verlag.
- 2016. (co-ed). Semantiken von Arbeit in diachroner und vergleichender Perspektive, Böhlau.
- 2017. (co-ed). Sakralität und Heldentum, Ergon Verlag.
- 2019. (co-ed). Javier Fernández-Sebastián: In Search of European Liberalisms. Concepts, Languages, Ideologies. Berghahn, New York.

=== Articles ===
- 2007. Multi-Ethnic Empires and the Military: Conscription in Europe between Integration and Desintegration [sic], 1860-1918, Journal of Modern European History, Volume 5: Issue 2, Munich. (with Ulrike von Hirschhausen)
- 2009. Rule and Conflict, Representation and Crisis: Multi-Ethnic Empires since the Nineteenth Century, Leiden, i:V. (with Ulrike von Hirschhausen).
- 2009. The Sediments of History. Language and the Time in the International Perception of Reinhard Koselleck, Brill Studies in the History of Political Thought, i:V, Leiden.
- 2011. Militär und Medien im 20. Jahrhundert, Themenheft der Militärgeschichtlichen Zeitschrift, Volume 70: Issue 1, Oldenbourg Wissenschaftsverlag, (with Ute Daniel and Martin Löffelholz).
- 2016. Semantiken von Arbeit. Diachrone und vergleichende Perspektiven, Industrielle Welt, Volume 9, Böhlau, (with Willibald Steinmetz).
