= War in History (book series) =

War in History (Krieg in der Geschichte, KRiG) is a German non-fiction book series established in 1999. Published by Verlag Ferdinand Schöningh, it focuses on the latest research in military history. The founding editors included historians Stig Förster of the University of Bern, Bernhard R. Kroener of the University of Potsdam, Bernd Wegner of the Helmut Schmidt University and Michael Werner (historian) of the École des Hautes Études en Sciences Sociales. Current editors are Christoph Mantel (University of Osnabrück), Isabelle Deflers (Universität der Bundeswehr München), Christian Koller (Swiss Social Archives) and Kerstin von Lingen (University of Vienna).

== Concept ==
The War in History series includes collections of essays or individual monographs, mostly in German (occasionally in English). Many of the works have been written as dissertations at German universities or research facilities, such as the Center for Military History and Social Sciences of the Bundeswehr. The publication in the series often explore the relationship between war and peace, as well as military and political means. For the editors of this series, investigations into the history of war cannot be carried out solely by "military considerations". Rather, historiographical diversity between foreign and domestic politics as well as society, economy and technology should be taken into account.

Propaganda und Terror in Weißrussland 1941–1944 ("Propaganda and Terror in Belarus 1941–1944") by Babette Quinkert focuses on the political-propagandist warfare of the German occupying power against civilian population and resistance movement in Belarus during World War II. According to the review by the historian Hans-Jürgen Döscher, "the author comes to the well-argued conclusion that propaganda and terror were inseparably linked to each other in the extermination campaign against the Soviet Union. Propagandists accompanied and justified the economic plunder of the country as well as the forced recruitment of "Eastern workers" and not least the murders of the Jewish civilian population. After 1945 they attempted to conceal the functional connection between psychological warfare and criminal occupation policy."

== Selected publications ==
- Rüdiger Overmans (Ed.): In der Hand des Feindes. Kriegsgefangenschaft von der Antike bis zum Zweiten Weltkrieg. Böhlau, Köln u.a. 1999, ISBN 3-412-14998-5.
- Thomas Kühne, Benjamin Ziemann (Eds): Was ist Militärgeschichte? (Krieg in der Geschichte, Band 6). Schöningh, Paderborn u.a. 2000, ISBN 3-506-74475-5.
- Karen Hagemann, Stefanie Schüler-Springorum (Eds): Heimat – Front. Militär- und Geschlechterverhältnisse im Zeitalter der Weltkriege (Reihe Geschichte und Geschlechter, Band 35). Campus, Frankfurt am Main u.a. 2001, ISBN 3-593-36837-4.
- Günther Kronenbitter, Markus Pöhlmann, Dierk Walter (Eds): Besatzung. Funktion und Gestalt militärischer Fremdherrschaft von der Antike bis zum 20. Jahrhundert (Krieg in der Geschichte, Band 28). Schöningh, Paderborn 2006, ISBN 3-506-71736-7.
- Sönke Neitzel, Daniel Hohrath (Eds): Kriegsgreuel. Die Entgrenzung der Gewalt in kriegerischen Konflikten vom Mittelalter bis ins 20. Jahrhundert (Krieg in der Geschichte, Band 40). Schöningh, Paderborn 2008, ISBN 978-3-506-76375-4.
- Markus Pöhlmann, Ulrike Ludwig, John Zimmermann (historian) (Eds): Ehre und Pflichterfüllung als Codes militärischer Tugenden (Krieg in der Geschichte, Volume 69). Schöningh, Paderborn 2014, ISBN 978-3-506-77312-8.
- Kerstin von Lingen, Klaus Gestwa (Eds): Zwangsarbeit als Kriegsressource in Europa und Asien (Krieg in der Geschichte, Volume 77). Schöningh, Paderborn u.a. 2014, ISBN 978-3-506-77727-0.
- Jens Westemeier: Himmlers Krieger. Joachim Peiper und die Waffen-SS in Krieg und Nachkriegszeit (Krieg in der Geschichte, Volume 71). 2014, ISBN 978-3-506-77241-1.
