= Klaus Gestwa =

German historian (born 1963)

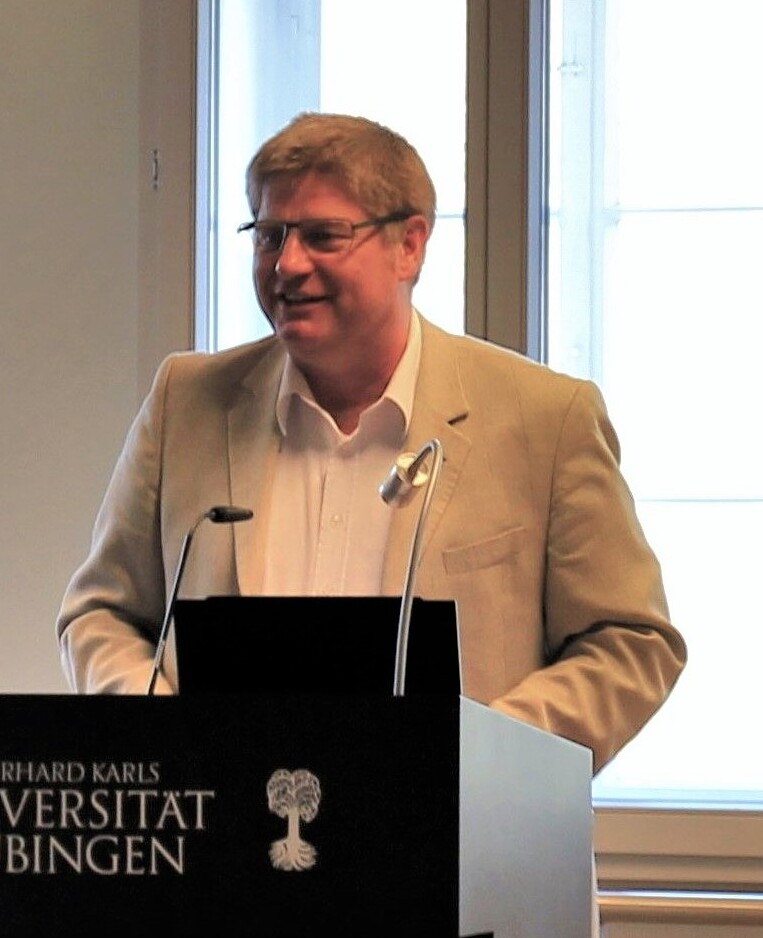
- Gestwa speaking at Eberhard Karls Universität Tübingen in May 2017.
- Born: 1963 (age 62–63)
- Education: Philipps-Universität Marburg; University of East Anglia; Moscow State University; Saint Petersburg State University
- Occupation: Historian
- Employer: Eberhard Karls Universität Tübingen

Klaus Gestwa (born 1963) is a German historian. Since 2009, he has been full professor for East European history at Tübingen University in Tübingen, Germany.

== Academic career ==
Klaus Gestwa studied history and Slavic studies at the universities of Marburg, Norwich, Moscow, and Leningrad from 1984 to 1991. He then worked as a research assistant at the University of Frankfurt am Main until 1994, before moving to the University of Tübingen. In 1996 he received his doctorate under Hans Lemberg and Dietrich Beyrau with a thesis on proto-industrialization in rural Russia.

Between 1996 and 2006, Klaus Gestwa was a research assistant in Tübingen, interrupted by research stays at the University of Chicago between 2004 and 2005. He qualified as a professor at the Faculty of History at the University of Tübingen in 2007 with a work on the history of technology and the environment on the history of Soviet hydroelectric power plants.

== Research ==
Klaus Gestwa has been a full professor at the University of Tübingen since the summer semester of 2009. His research interests include the scientific, technological and environmental history of the Soviet Union, the cultural history of the Cold War, the history of disasters in Eastern Europe and the history of perestroika. Since 2013 he has been a member of the scientific advisory boards of the Research Centre for Eastern Europe at the University of Bremen and the Tübingen Institute for Danube Swabian History and Regional Studies, among others. In addition, he is co-editor of several series and journals and since 2013 also a liaison lecturer of the Friedrich Ebert Foundation.

Since 2023 he has been co-editor of the Vierteljahrshefte für Zeitgeschichte.

== Selected works ==
=== Books ===
- Klaus Gestwa (2019). Der Russische Revolutionszyklus. Bayerische Landeszentrale für politische Bildungsarbeit.
- Klaus Gestwa (2010). Die Stalinschen Großbauten des Kommunismus. sowjetische Technik- und Umweltgeschichte, 1948–1967. Ordnungssysteme, 30. München: Oldenbourg. ISBN 978-3-486-58963-4.
- Klaus Gestwa (1999). Proto-Industrialisierung in Rußland. Wirtschaft, Herrschaft und Kultur in Ivanovo und Pavlovo, 1741–1932. Veröffentlichungen des Max-Planck-Instituts für Geschichte, 149. Göttingen: Vandenhoeck und Ruprecht. ISBN 978-3-525-35464-3.

=== Editorships ===
- Soviet Nuclear Modernity. Transnational dimensions, decentering dynamics and enduring legacies. Edited together with Stefan Guth, Tanja Penter, and Julia Richers (= Cahiers du Monde Russe, 60, 2–3/2019).
- Katastrophen im östlichen Europa. Edited together with Marc Elie. Stuttgart 2014 (= Jahrbücher für Geschichte Osteuropas, 2/2014).
- Soziale Ungleichheit im Staatssozialismus. Edited together with Jens Gieseke and Jan-Holger Kirsch. Göttingen 2013 (= Zeithistorische Forschungen, 2/2013).
- Visuelle Geschichte Russlands im 19. Jahrhundert. Edited together with Katharina Kucher. Stuttgart 2012 (= Jahrbücher für Geschichte Osteuropas, 4/2012).
- Aufbruch aus dem GULag. Stuttgart 2009 (= Jahrbücher für Geschichte Osteuropas, 4/2009).
- Kooperation trotz Konfrontation. Wissenschaft und Technik im Kalten Krieg. Edited together with Stefan Rohdewald. Berlin 2009 (= Osteuropa, 10/2009).
