= Wilhelm Deist =

German historian and author

- Born: 1931; Weimar Republic
- Died: 2003 (aged 71–72); Germany
- Occupations: Historian, author, editor

Academic background
- Education: University of Freiburg

Academic work
- Era: 20th century
- Institutions: Military History Research Office (MGFA), Chief Historian; Military History Working Group, Chairman
- Main interests: Modern European history, military history, historiography
- Notable works: Germany and the Second World War

Wilhelm Deist (1931–2003) was a German historian and author who specialised in the European history of 19th and 20th with an emphasis on the history of World War I. Deist was senior historian at the Military History Research Office (MGFA) and honorary professor at the University of Freiburg. Deist was a widely published author and a chief editor of the seminal series Germany and the Second World War from the MGFA.

Deist's research focused on the history of the First and Second World Wars. He had a long career at the MGFA, where he succeeded Manfred Messerschmidt as chief historian and oversaw Germany and the Second World War. Under Deist's direction, the series continued to emphasise multi-disciplinary approach to the war, integrating political, societal and economic research, in addition to providing the classic operational history. According to the historian and journalist Sven Felix Kellerhoff, the completed series shows that this goal has been met: of the 87 contributions, 44 are dealing with operations in a narrow sense, the others with their precursors and consequences.

Deist was a founding member the Military History Working Group, a professional association of German military historians. From 1995 to 2002, he was the chairman of the association, and from 2002 to 2003, its honorary chairman. In 2006, the association established the Wilhelm Deist Prize for Military History in his honour.

== Works ==
=== In English ===
- The Wehrmacht and German rearmament, University of Toronto Press, 1981, ISBN 978-0802024237
- Germany and the Second World War, Volume I: The Build-up of German Aggression, with Manfred Messerschmidt, Hans-Erich Volkmann and Wolfram Wette
- The Kaiser: New Research on Wilhelm II's Role in Imperial Germany, with Annika Mombauer (as editor), Yale University Press, 2003

=== In German ===
- Militär und Innenpolitik im Weltkrieg 1914–1918 (Quellen zur Geschichte des Parlamentarismus und der politischen Parteien, Zweite Reihe: Militär und Politik, Bände 1 and 2), Düsseldorf 1970
- Flottenpolitik und Flottenpropaganda: Das Nachrichtenbureau des Reichsmarineamtes 1897–1914 (Beitrage zur Militar- und Kriegsgeschichte), Deutsche Verlags-Anstalt, 1976, ISBN 978-3421017758
- Rüstung im Zeichen der wilhelminischen Weltpolitik Grundlegende Dokumente 1890-1914, Wilhelm Deist und Volker R. Berghahn (Droste, Düsseldorf), 1988, ISBN 9783770007622
- Militär, Staat und Gesellschaft. Studien zur preußisch-deutschen Militärgeschichte, Munich, 1991, ISBN 9783486559194.
