= Hans-Erich Volkmann =

German historian

- Born: 15 March 1938 (age 87)
- Occupations: historian, editor, author
- Notable work: Germany and the Second World War

Hans-Erich Volkmann (born 15 March 1938) is a German historian, whose works primarily deal with the history of Germany from the 19th–20th century, and particularly how it relates to the East European states. He is one of the authors of the first volume of Germany and the Second World War. He has also been one of the editors of Militärgeschichtliche Zeitschrift.

== Bibliography ==
as author

- Die russische Emigration in Deutschland 1919–1929. Würzburg 1966 (zugleich Diss.).
- Die deutsche Baltikumpolitik zwischen Brest-Litovsk und Compiègne. Böhlau, Köln/Wien 1970 (zugleich Habil.-Schrift).
- Wirtschaft im Dritten Reich, 2 Bde. Eine Bibliographie. München 1980, Koblenz 1984.
- with Wilhelm Deist, Manfred Messerschmidt und Wolfram Wette: Ursachen und Voraussetzungen des Zweiten Weltkrieges (= Fischer-Taschenbuch, Nr. 2480), Frankfurt/M. 1989.
- Ökonomie und Expansion. Grundzüge der NS-Wirtschaftspolitik. München 2003.
- Luxemburg im Zeichen des Hakenkreuzes. Eine politische Wirtschaftsgeschichte 1933 bis 1944. Paderborn/München/Wien/Zürich 2010.
- Die Polenpolitik des Kaiserreichs. Prolog zum Zeitalter der Weltkriege. Schöningh, Paderborn 2016, ISBN 978-3-506-78433-9.

as editor

- Die Krise des Parlamentarismus in Ostwithteleuropa zwischen den beiden Weltkriegen. Marburg 1967.
- Das Russlandbild im Dritten Reich. Köln/Weimar/Wien 1994.
- Ende des Dritten Reiches – Ende des Zweiten Weltkrieges. Eine perspektivische Rückschau. (= Serie Piper, Bd. 2056). München/ Zürich 1995.
- Quellen zur Innenpolitik in der Ära Adenauer 1949–1963. Darmstadt 2005.
- Der Bundestagsausschuss für Verteidigung und seine Vorläufer (Protokolle). Band 1, Düsseldorf 2006.

as co-editor

- with Friedrich Forstmeier: Wirtschaft und Rüstung am Vorabend des Zweiten Weltkrieges. Düsseldorf 1975.
- with Friedrich Forstmeier: Kriegswirtschaft und Rüstung 1939–1945. Düsseldorf 1977.
- with Walter Schwengler: Die europäische Verteidigungsgemeinschaft. Boppard a. Rhein 1985.
- with Bruno Thoß: Zwischen Kaltem Krieg und Entspannung. Boppard a. Rhein 1988.
- with Rolf-Dieter Müller: Die Wehrmacht. Mythos und Realität. München 1999.
- with Bruno Thoß: Erster Weltkrieg – Zweiter Weltkrieg. Ein Vergleich. Paderborn/München/Wien/Zürich 2002
