= The Wehrmacht: History, Myth, Reality =

2002 book by Wolfram Wette

- Author: Wolfram Wette
- Original title: Die Wehrmacht. Feindbilder, Vernichtungskrieg, Legenden [The Wehrmacht: Images of the Enemy, War of Extermination, Legends]
- Translator: Deborah Lucas Schneider
- Language: English, German
- Genre: History; Historiography
- Publisher: S. Fischer Verlag (German edition); Harvard University Press (English edition)
- Publication date: 2002
- Publication place: United States
- English publication date: 2007
- Media type: Print
- ISBN: 978-0-674-02577-6

The Wehrmacht: History, Myth, Reality is a 2002 book by German historian Wolfram Wette which discusses the Myth of the clean Wehrmacht. The original German-language book was translated into five languages; the English edition was published in 2007 by Harvard University Press. The book builds on Omer Bartov's 1985 study The Eastern Front, 1941–1945: German Troops and the Barbarisation of Warfare. The book received a positive reception.

== Concept ==
The book was first published in German with a title that translates as The Wehrmacht: Images of the Enemy, War of Extermination, Legends. According to Benjamin Schwarz, "These works have conclusively demonstrated that the Wehrmacht—and not, as postwar accounts by German generals would have it, merely the SS—freely and even eagerly joined in murder and genocide".

The book complements earlier studies that focused on the average soldier and in turn discusses the complicity of the highest levels of the Wehrmacht. Wette discusses the commanding officers and colonels, demonstrating that they not only knew about but created the myth of the clean Wehrmacht.

== Reception ==
Reviewing the work, Geoffrey Megargee wrote that "until Wette's work, there was no concise, general survey on the Wehrmacht's crimes, at least for an English-speaking audience. Thus, his work fills a significant gap in the literature". Megargee wrote that although Wette makes the Wehrmacht leadership fully accountable for war crimes the case is less clear for many of the lower ranks and that further research is needed. Lee Baker, in reviewing Wette's book for the Society for Military History, notes that it is not about "the average soldier's descent into barbarism". Instead, it is "a study of the path trod by the commanding officers... who formulated policy and created an environment in which mass murder could occur".

Steve Choe of the University of Iowa, in reviewing the book, wrote "It aims to debunk the legend of the Wehrmacht's "clean hands", a legend that exculpates the Germany army from any misdeed during World War Two" and "Wette delivers a devastating blow to this set of myths through careful research and astute interpretation".

Stephen G. Fritz wrote "Leading German military historian Wolfram Wette has written the equivalent of an extended lawyer's brief arguing for a fundamental revision of the popular conception of the role of the German army during World War II" and "his arguments will provide a powerful corrective to the outdated view that Wehrmacht leaders were dragged unwillingly into complicity in Nazi-mandated crimes".

Publishers Weekly wrote "The conventional wisdom that the German army in WWII fought a relatively clean fight, unsullied by the atrocities committed by the Nazi SS, has recently been challenged—and largely demolished. This probing study explores the rise and fall of that myth in the light of scholarship debunking it".

== See also ==
- Hitler's War in the East 1941−1945: A Critical Assessment
- The Myth of the Eastern Front: The Nazi-Soviet War in American Popular Culture
- Marching into Darkness
- Hannes Heer
