= Wolfram Wette =

German military historian (born 1940)

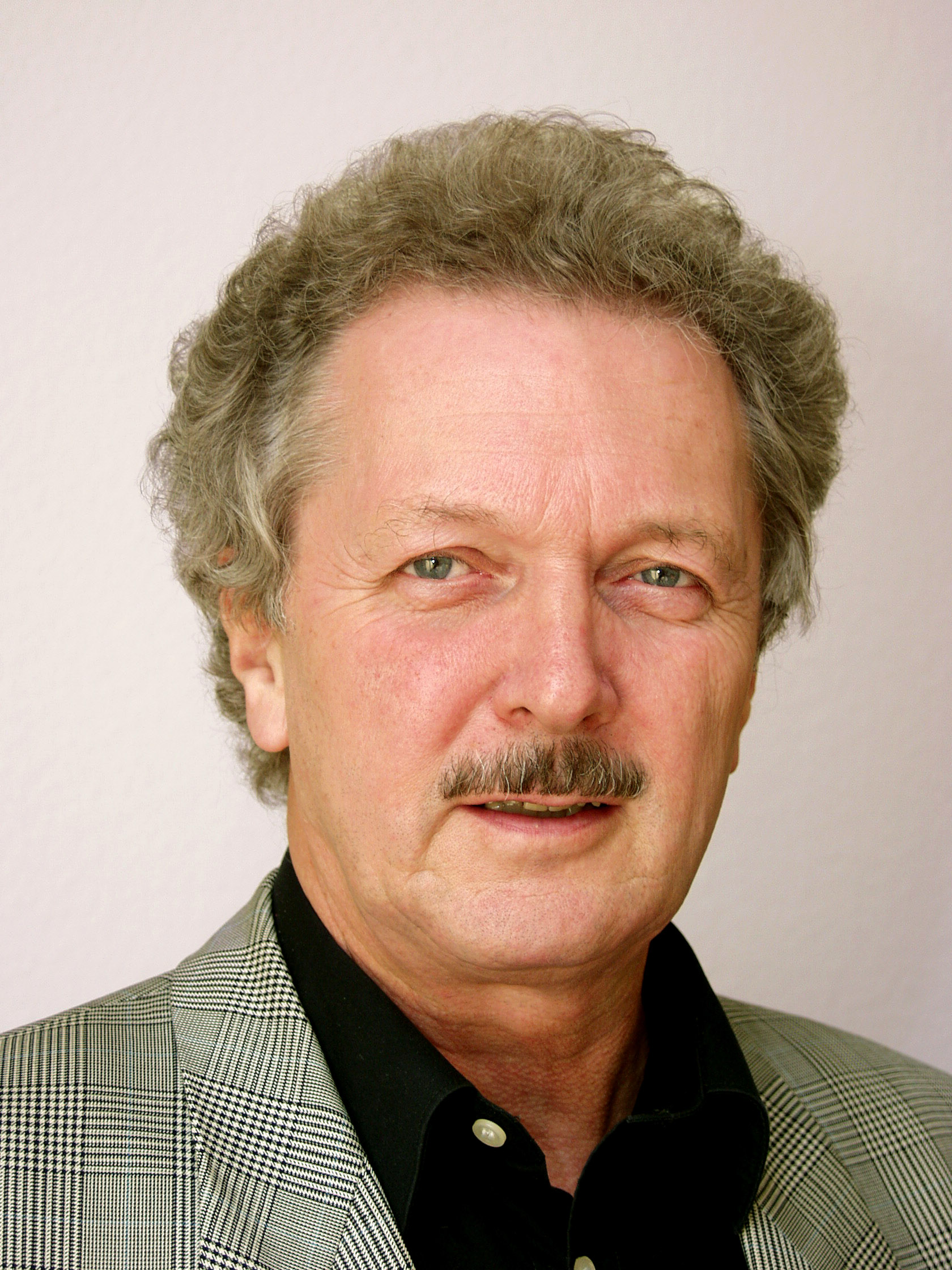
- Wette in 2008
- Born: 11 November 1940 (age 86); Germany
- Occupations: Historian; author; editor
- Awards: Order of Merit of the Federal Republic of Germany

Academic work
- Era: 20th century, World War II
- Institutions: Military History Research Office; University of Freiburg
- Main interests: Modern European history, military history, historiography
- Notable works: Germany and the Second World War; The Wehrmacht: History, Myth, Reality

Wolfram Wette (born 11 November 1940) is a German military historian and peace researcher. He is an author or editor of over 40 books on the history of Nazi Germany, including the seminal Germany and the Second World War series from the German Military History Research Office (MGFA).

Wette's 2002 book, The Wehrmacht: History, Myth, Reality has been translated into five languages and deals with the issue of Wehrmacht criminality during World War II and the legend of its "clean hands". In 2015, Wette was a recipient of the Order of Merit of the Federal Republic of Germany, the only federal honour awarded to German citizens for exceptional achievements.

== Education and career ==
From 1971 to 1995 Wette worked at the Military History Research Office (MGFA). Afterwards, he was a professor of history at the University of Freiburg. Wette was a co-founder of the Historical Peace Research Working Group (Arbeitskreis Historische Friedens- und Konfliktforschung e.V.). He was a member of the municipal council of Freiburg from 1980 to 1989 as a member of the Social Democratic Party of Germany, and was also the chairman of the SPD parliamentary group and the SPD city association chairman.

== Historian of Nazi Germany ==
Wette is an author or editor of forty books on the history of Nazi Germany, including the Wehrmacht (armed forces), its leadership and its relationship with Nazism. Wette's works explored topics that at the time of their publication were considered taboo or not widely discussed in Germany, such as desertion, treason and aid to victims of the Nazi regime from military personnel. Despite thousands of executions for "undermining of military morale", Wette's research has shown that only three Wehrmacht servicemen were executed for helping Jews. Wette explored the topic in his book Feldwebel Anton Schmid: Ein Held der Humanität [Feldwebel Anton Schmid: A Hero of Humanity]. The book told the story of Anton Schmid, who aided Jews confined to the Vilna Ghetto. He was sentenced to death by his military superiors and executed in 1942. Because of the controversial nature of Wette's work, he has received death threats.

== The Wehrmacht: History, Myth, Reality ==
Wette's 2002 book Die Wehrmacht. Feindbilder, Vernichtungskrieg, Legenden [The Wehrmacht: Images of the Enemy, War of Extermination, Legends] was published in 2006 in English as The Wehrmacht: History, Myth, Reality by Harvard University Press. Building on Omer Bartov's 1985 study The Eastern Front, 1941–1945: German Troops and the Barbarisation of Warfare, the book deconstructs the myth of the clean Wehrmacht. According to The Atlantic, it shows that "the Wehrmacht—and not, as postwar accounts by German generals would have it, merely the SS—freely and even eagerly joined in murder and genocide, which were central, rather than incidental, features of its effort".

The book complements the earlier studies that focused on the average Landser (soldier) and also discusses the complicity of the highest levels of the Wehrmacht. Reviewing the work, the historian Geoffrey P. Megargee notes that "until Wette's work, there was no concise, general survey on the Wehrmacht's crimes, at least for an English-speaking audience. Thus, his work fills a significant gap in the literature". The review goes on to criticize the book for omitting key areas, according to Megargee, for assessing the Wehrmacht's criminality, including the murder of more than 3 million Soviet prisoners of war, the Bandenbekämpfung (bandit-fighting) doctrine of carrying out counter-insurgency warfare with maximum brutality, and criminal orders, such as the Commissar Order.

== Awards ==
- 2015: Order of Merit of the Federal Republic of Germany

== Selected works ==
=== In English ===
- With Wilhelm Deist, Manfred Messerschmidt, Hans-Erich Volkmann: Germany and the Second World War, Volume I: The Build-up of German Aggression. Oxford University Press, ISBN 0-19-822866-X
- The Wehrmacht: History, Myth, Reality, Cambridge, MA: Harvard University Press. 2007, ISBN 9780674025776

=== In German ===
- Kriegstheorien deutscher Sozialisten. Marx, Engels, Lassalle, Bernstein, Kautsky, Luxemburg. Ein Beitrag zur Friedensforschung. Kohlhammer, Stuttgart u. a. 1971, ISBN 3-17-094150-X.
- With Wilhelm Deist, Manfred Messerschmidt, Hans-Erich Volkmann: Ursachen und Voraussetzungen der deutschen Kriegspolitik (= Das Deutsche Reich und der Zweite Weltkrieg. Bd. 1). Deutsche Verlags-Anstalt, Stuttgart 1979; aktualisierte Taschenbuchausgabe: Ursachen und Voraussetzungen des Zweiten Weltkrieges. Fischer Taschenbuch, Frankfurt am Main 1989, ISBN 3-596-24432-3
- With Gerd R. Ueberschär: Bomben und Legenden. Die schrittweise Aufklärung des Luftangriffs auf Freiburg am 10. Mai 1940. Ein dokumentarischer Bericht. Rombach, Freiburg im Breisgau 1981, ISBN 3-7930-0292-6.
- Gustav Noske. Eine politische Biographie. Droste, Düsseldorf 1987, ISBN 3-7700-0728-X.
- Militarismus und Pazifismus. Auseinandersetzung mit den deutschen Kriegen. Donat, Bremen 1991, ISBN 3-924444-50-1.
- Die Wehrmacht. Feindbilder, Vernichtungskrieg, Legenden. S. Fischer, Frankfurt am Main 2002, ISBN 3-10-091208-X (translated in English, French, Spanish, Polish)
- Militarismus in Deutschland. Geschichte einer kriegerischen Kultur. Fischer-Taschenbuch-Verlag, Frankfurt a.M. 2011, ISBN 978-3-596-18149-0.
- Gustav Noske und die Revolution in Kiel 1918 (= Sonderveröffentlichungen der Gesellschaft für Kieler Stadtgeschichte Bd. 64.) Boyens, Heide 2010, ISBN 978-3-8042-1322-7.
- Karl Jäger. Mörder der litauischen Juden. Fischer Taschenbuch, Frankfurt am Main 2011, ISBN 978-3-596-19064-5.
- Feldwebel Anton Schmid: Ein Held der Humanität. S. Fischer, Frankfurt am Main 2013, ISBN 978-3-10-091209-1.
- Ehre, wem Ehre gebührt! Täter, Widerständler und Retter (1939–1945) (= Schriftenreihe Geschichte & Frieden. Bd. 24). Donat, Bremen 2014, ISBN 978-3-943425-30-7.
