= Manfred Messerschmidt =

German military historian (1926–2022)

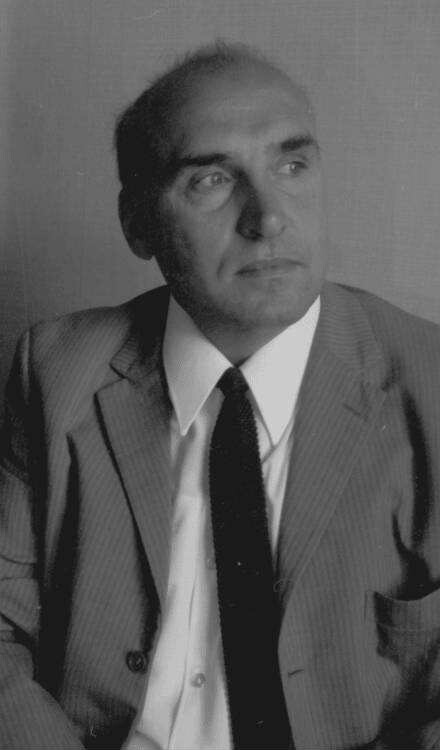
- Manfred Messerschmidt, 1969
- Born: 1 October 1926; Dortmund, Westphalia, Prussia, Weimar Republic
- Died: 18 December 2022 (aged 96); Freiburg im Breisgau
- Occupations: Historian; jurist; author; editor

Academic background
- Education: University of Münster; University of Freiburg

Academic work
- Era: 19th and 20th centuries
- Institutions: Military History Research Office
- Main interests: Modern European history; military history; historiography
- Notable works: Germany and the Second World War

Manfred Messerschmidt (1 October 1926 – 18 December 2022) was a German historian who specialised in the history of Nazi Germany and World War II. He was the longtime research director at the Military History Research Office (MGFA) who conceived and launched the seminal series of books Germany and the Second World War, edited by the MGFA.

Messerschmidt was one of the most important military historians of Germany after 1945 and is considered to be the founder of modern military history in Germany. He was an expert on international military law and an author of multiple books on German military history of the 19th and 20th centuries.

== Education and career ==
Born on 1 October 1926 in Dortmund, Messerschmidt grew up in the northeast of his hometown, a mostly social-democratic neighbourhood, under the Nazi regime. From May 1944 till the end of World War II he served as Luftwaffenhelfer, then as pioneer with the Wehrmacht. He was briefly a US prisoner of war.

After the war, Messerschmidt achieved the Abitur in 1947, and then studied history at the University of Münster and the University of Freiburg. He completed his doctorate under the supervision of historian Gerhard Ritter, and earned his PhD in 1954 with a dissertation about Germany from the view of English historians. After working in the insurance sector, Messerschmidt studied law and passed the second state exam (a specific German professional law degree qualifying him to be appointed a judge) in 1962. The unusual combination of historian and jurist qualified him for the Military History Research Office (MGFA) in Freiburg, an institution of the Federal Ministry of Defence. He joined in 1962; it had been founded only five years earlier. In 1971, Helmut Schmidt, who was then defence minister, recommended him to be the organisation's chief historian, and president Gustav Heinemann appointed him to the post, also as director and professor. He held the position until 1978, making the institution one of the most respected institutes for German history.

From 1987 to 1988, Messerschmidt was a member of the Waldheim Commission that investigated the Waldheim Affair, involving the alleged Nazi past of Kurt Waldheim, then newly elected as President of Austria. Messerschmidt was the deputy chairman of the German Holocaust Museum Foundation. He was also president of the Internationale Gesellschaft für Wehrrecht und Kriegsvölkerrecht, and general-secretary of the German committee for the history of the Second World War (Geschichte des Zweiten Weltkriegs).

== Military historian of Nazi Germany ==
At the end of 1971, Messerschmidt took over the scientific management of the MGFA. He launched the ten-volume history Germany and the Second World War, which focused on the interdependent relationship between military events and society. The first four volumes were set against the backdrop of the Cold War, and the German debate on rearmament in view of the country's catastrophic military past. Messerschmidt was a recognised expert on international military law who was called upon to testify in high-profile court cases pertaining to World War II war crimes. The studies, which were designed and conceived in the Messerschmidt era, continue to set the trend for a society-oriented military history.

== Death ==
Messerschmidt died on 18 December 2022, at the age of 96, in Freiburg im Breisgau.

== Works ==
=== In English ===
- Germany and the Second World War, Volume I: The Build-up of German Aggression, with Wilhelm Deist, Hans-Erich Volkmann and Wolfram Wette

=== In German ===
- Die Wehrmacht im NS-Staat. Zeit der Indoktrination (= Truppe und Verwaltung Bd. 16). Von Decker, Hamburg 1969
- Militärgeschichte. Probleme, Thesen, Wege. Im Auftrag des Militärgeschichtlichen Forschungsamtes aus Anlass seines 25-jährigen Bestehens ausgewählt und zusammengestellt von Manfred Messerschmidt. DVA, Stuttgart 1982, ISBN 3-421-06122-X.
- Die Wehrmachtjustiz im Dienste des Nationalsozialismus. Zerstörung einer Legende. Nomos, Baden-Baden 1987, ISBN 3-7890-1466-4. with Fritz Wüllner
- Militärgeschichtliche Aspekte der Entwicklung des deutschen Nationalstaates. Droste, Düsseldorf 1988, ISBN 3-7700-0775-1
- Was damals Recht war… NS-Militär und Strafjustiz im Vernichtungskrieg. Klartext, Essen 1996, ISBN 3-88474-487-9
- Die Wehrmachtjustiz 1933–1945. Schöningh, Paderborn u.a. 2005, ISBN 3-506-71349-3
