= Harald Welzer =

German social psychologist (born 1958)

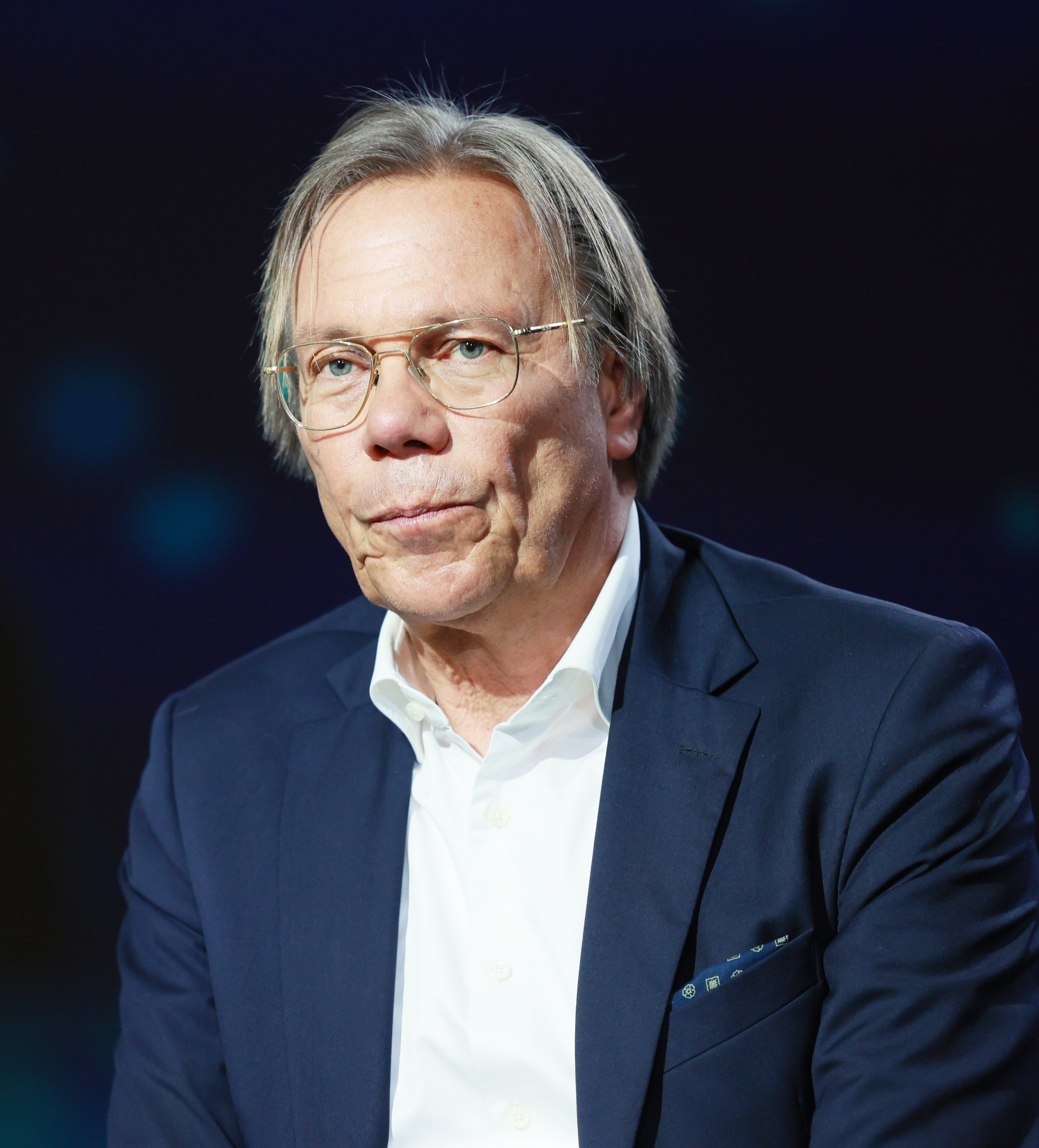
- Welzer in 2023
- Born: 27 July 1958; Wedemark, West Germany
- Education: University of Hannover
- Scientific career
- Fields: Sociology
- Workplaces: University of Flensburg

Harald Welzer (born 27 July 1958, Wedemark) is a German social psychologist. He studied sociology, psychology and literature at the University of Hannover. He has been a professor of transformation design at the University of Flensburg since 2012. His research is focused on memory, violence and the social impacts of climate change. His books have been translated into 15 languages.

Welzer was one of the first signers of the Open Letter to the German Position on Russo-Ukrainian War in April 2022, who demanded not to support Ukraine with heavy arms in order to "prevent a third world war".

== Books in English ==
- 2012 Climate Wars: What People Will Be Killed For in the 21st Century, Polity Press
- 2012 Soldaten: On Fighting, Killing and Dying. The Secret World War II Transcripts of German POWs (with Sönke Neitzel)
