= Ferdinand Schöningh =

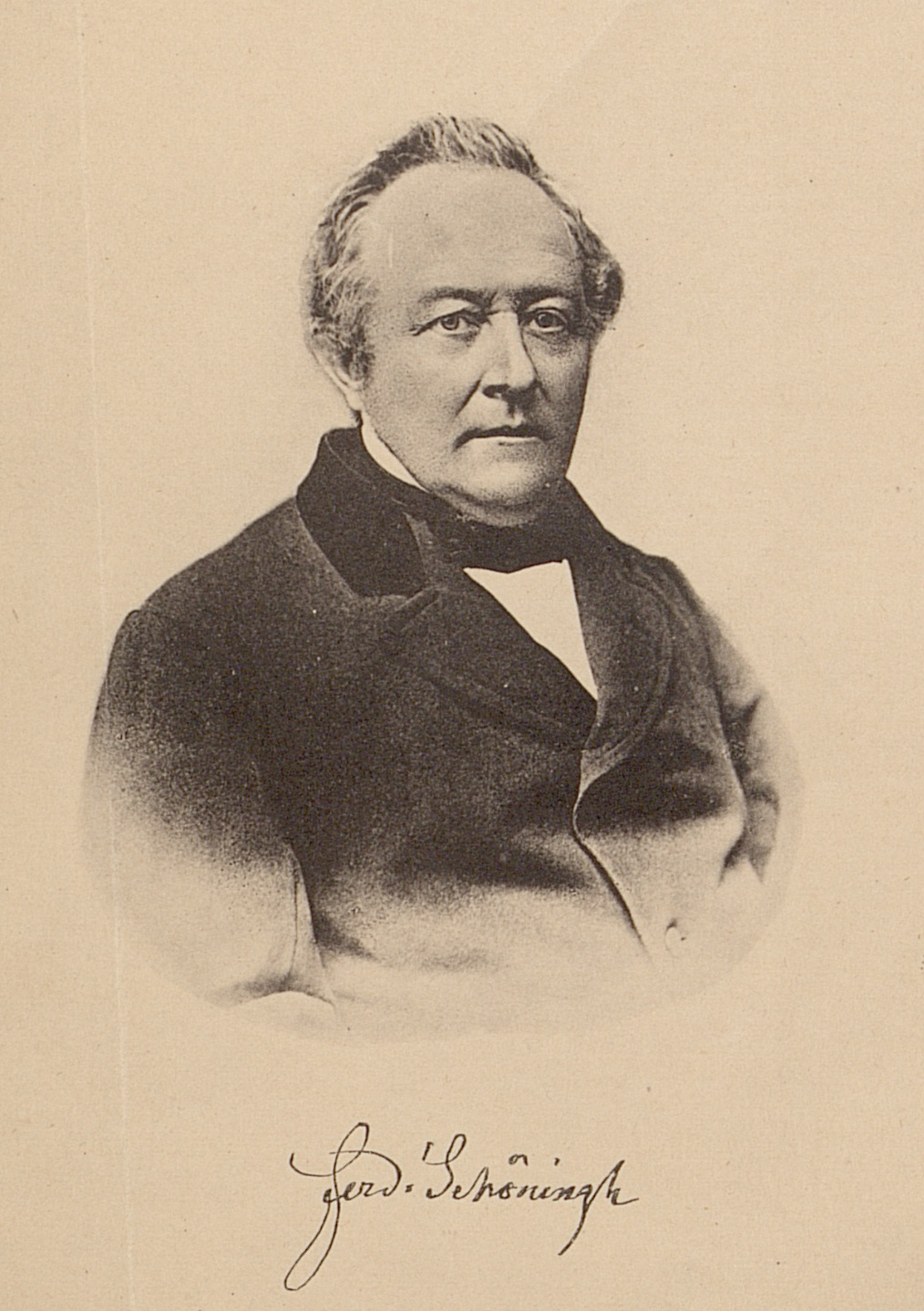
Ferdinand Schöningh

Ferdinand Schöningh (born March 16, 1815, in Meppen; died August 18, 1883, in Paderborn) was a German bookseller and publisher.

== Life ==
His father was Henricus Jacobus Schöningh (born 10. Januar 1782 in Ootmarsum, Provinz Overijssel; died 6 October 1833 in Meppen) was Amtmann of Amt Meppen, His mother was Josephine Coppenrath (born 19 October 1789 in Münster; died 31 March 1851 in Meppen) was daughter of German bookseller and publisher Joseph Heinrich Coppenrath (1761–1853) in Münster.

Ferdinand Schönigh found German publishing company Verlag Ferdinand Schöningh in Paderborn.

Works of writers of his publishing company were Joseph von Eichendorff, Ferdinand Freiligrath or Friedrich Wilhelm Grimme and Friedrich Wilhelm Weber. Works by Luise Hensel, for example Müde bin ich, geh zur Ruh or of Antonie Jüngst were published by his company in Paderborn.

In 1848, Ferdinand Schönigh found weekly newspaper Westfälisches Kirchenblatt für Katholiken. In 1849, he found daily newspaper Westfälisches Volksblatt.

In 1864 Schönigh was member of the Soeseter Conferences in Soest, where the German political party Zemtrum was started.

Ferdinand Schönigh married Sophie Overweg (1826–1905) from Soest. Together they had four children: Maria, Ferdinand (1856–1925), Anna und Joseph. His son Ferdinand became later publisher and bookseller of his company.in Paderborn.
