= Dieter Langewiesche =

German historian

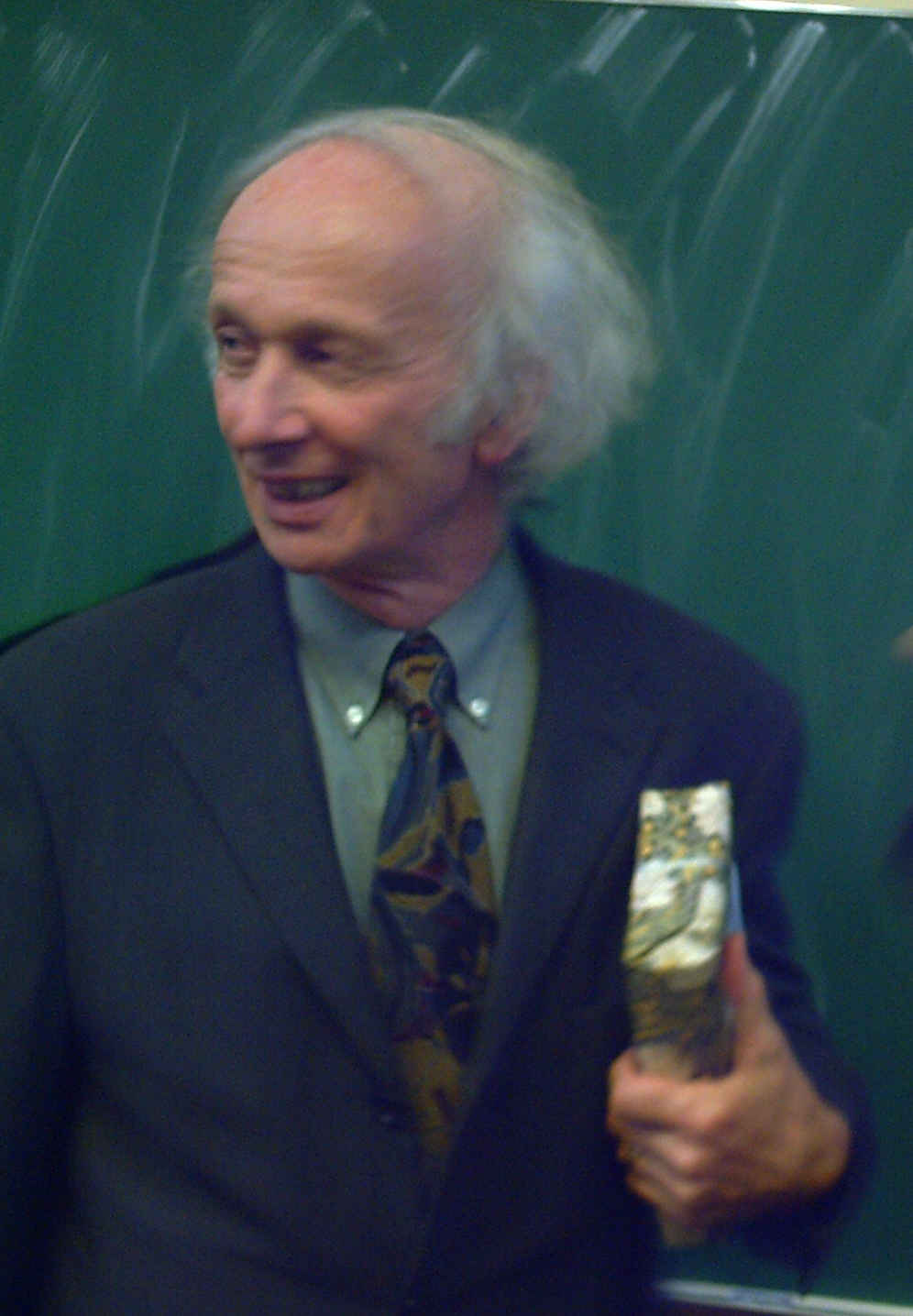
- Dieter Langewiesche at his farewell symposium on 26 January 2008
- Born: January 11, 1943 (age 83); Sankt Sebastian, Mariazell, Nazi Germany
- Awards: Gottfried Wilhelm Leibniz Prize (1996)

Academic work
- Discipline: History
- Sub-discipline: Nationalism, liberalism
- Notable works: Liberalism in Germany (2000); Europe 1848: Revolution and Reform (2001); Territorial Revisionism and the Allies of Germany in the Second World War (2012)

Dieter Langewiesche (born 11 January 1943 in Sankt Sebastian, Mariazell) is a German historian. Langewiesche is one of the leading experts on the history of nationalism and liberalism.

In 1996 he received the Gottfried Wilhelm Leibniz Prize.

== Works ==
=== In English ===
- Liberalism in Germany. Translated by Christiane Banerji. Princeton University Press, Princeton NJ 2000, ISBN 0-691-01032-3
- Europe 1848. Revolution and Reform. Edited by Dieter Dowe, Heinz-Gerhard Haupt, D. L. and Jonathan Sperber, New York, Oxford: Berghahn Books, 2001. ISBN 978-1-57181-164-6
- Territorial Revisionism and the Allies of Germany in the Second World War: Goals, Expectations, Practices. Edited by Marina Cattaruzza, Stefan Dyroff & Dieter Langewiesche. New York: Berghahn Books 2012. ISBN 978-1-78238-920-0 (PB)
