= Guillaume Piketty =

French historian (born 1965)

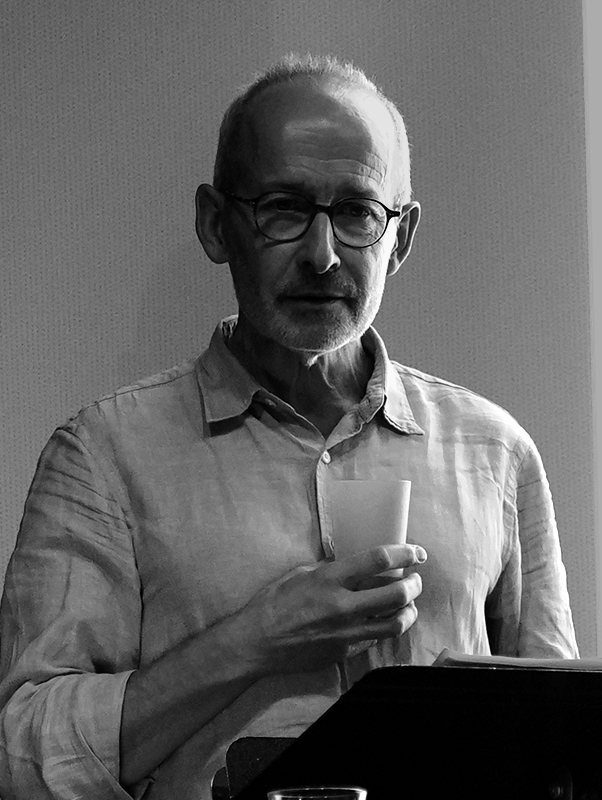
2025

Guillaume Piketty (born 1965) is a French historian. His specialty is the 20th century history of Europe, especially the Second World War and the French Resistance. He received his doctorate from Institut d'études politiques (Sciences Po Paris) in 1998 for his thesis "Itinéraire intellectuel et politique de Pierre Brossolette" he has specialized in studies of the resister Pierre Brossolette and in the history of the Free French movement during the Second World War.

He was one of the two editors of Encyclopédie de la Seconde Guerre mondiale (2017) ISBN 9782221116326, and one of the three editors of Dictionnaire de Gaulle (2006) ISBN

== Books ==
- Piketty, Guillaume. Pierre Brossolette: un héros de la Résistance. Paris: O. Jacob, 1998. ISBN 9782738105394
- Piketty, Guillaume. La bataille des Ardennes: 16 décembre 1944-31 janvier 1945. Paris: Tallandier, 2015. ISBN 9791021014022
- Piketty, Guillaume. Résister: les archives intimes des combattants de l'ombre. Paris: Textuel, 2011. ISBN 9782845974241
- Piketty, Guillaume, and Serge Berstein. Parcours résistants en France (1940-1945), entre histoire et mémoire. [S.l.]: [s.n.], 2002. OCLC 494250144
- Piketty, Guillaume. Français en résistance: carnets de guerre, correspondance, journaux personnels. Paris: Robert Laffont, 2009. ISBN 9782221101438
