= Frank Bajohr =

German historian

Frank Bajohr (born 16 August 1961 in Gladbeck) is a German historian, best known for his books "Aryanisation" in Hamburg (2002), Erik Blumenfeld (2010), and The Political Diary of Alfred Rosenberg and the Onset of the Holocaust (2015).

He is affiliated with the Forschungsstelle für Zeitgeschichte in Hamburg and a Research Fellow at the International Institute for Holocaust Research at Yad Vashem, Jerusalem.

Bajohr received habilitation in history and a Ph.D. in philosophy from the University of Hamburg in Germany where he is now a Senior Researcher and Lecturer. His research focuses on Nazi Germany and the Holocaust, and he is the author of numerous scholarly articles and books that have received critical acclaim. In February 2001, his book Parvenüs und Profiteure. Korruption in der NS-Zeit [Parvenues and Profiteers: Corruption in the Third Reich] (2001) was voted the number 1 title by the German book critics, and in July 2003 Unser Hotel ist judenfrei [“Our Hotel is Free of Jews”] (2003) was voted the number 2 title by the German book critics.

One of his best known books is Aryanisation' in Hamburg: The Economic Exclusion of Jews and the Confiscation of Their Property in Nazi Germany, 1933-1945 which reviewer Martin Dean described as "path-breaking" because of its focus on the early period of persecution of the Jews and the participation of the German population in the seizure of Jewish property:

Frank Bajohr's path-breaking work is an excellent regional study that anticipated the direction of much recent scholarship and points the way for others to follow. When first published in 1997, his monograph went against the predominant line of research on Nazi Germany, a trend that had sought to explain the persecution of the Jews mainly in terms of the centralized structures of Himmler and Heydrich's security forces. Bajohr, by contrast, focuses on the early period of persecution before the start of the war and describes the participation of many different strata of the population in the economic persecution and spoliation of Germany's Jews. His analysis of the progressive exclusion of Jews from the local economy, the "Aryanization" of their businesses, and the seizure of their property emphasizes the cumulative and self-radicalizing nature of this process.:

Bajohr is currently head of the Center for Holocaust Studies at the Institute of Contemporary History in Munich and a member of the Project Management Board at the European Holocaust Research Infrastructure (EHRI).

== See also ==
- Aryanisation
- The Holocaust
- Nazi Germany
