= Kerstin von Lingen =

German military historian (born 1971)

- Born: 1971 (age 54–55); Bremen, Germany
- Awards: Fellow of the Royal Historical Society (2008)

Academic background
- Education: University of Freiburg; University of Tübingen
- Thesis: Britischen Kriegsverbrecher und Begnadigungspolitik am Beispiel des Verfahrens gegen Feldmarschall Albert Kesselring in Italien (2004)
- Doctoral advisor: Dieter Langewiesche

Academic work
- Discipline: Military history
- Institutions: Salford University; University of Marburg; University of Tübingen; Heidelberg University

Kerstin von Lingen (born 1971) is a German military historian who specialises in the study of war crimes. She is best known for her works on Field Marshal Albert Kesselring and SS Obergruppenfuehrer Karl Wolff.

== Biography ==
Kerstin von Lingen was in born Bremen in 1971. In 1991, she entered the Albert Ludwig University of Freiburg, where she studied modern history, medieval history, and Italian. She then studied history and political science at the University of Milan in 1993–1994. She earned her M.A. at the University of Freiburg, writing a thesis on "Totaler Krieg auf Italienisch? Die deutsche Auslandspropaganda in Italien 1943-1944 ("Total War in Italy? German Propaganda in Italy 1943-1944"). She then wrote her Ph.D. thesis on Britische Kriegsverbrecher und Begnadigungspolitik am Beispiel des Verfahrens gegen Feldmarschall Albert Kesselring in Italien ("British war criminals and pardon policy on the example of the case against Field Marshal Albert Kesselring in Italy") under the supervision of Dieter Langewiesche. This was published in German as Kesselrings letzte Schlacht (2004) and in English as Kesselring's Last Battle (2009). Her rigorosum was on 29 July 2003.

In 2005, von Lingen commenced work on a research project, Immunität durch Kapitulationsverhandlungen: der Fall des SS-Obergruppenführers Karl Wolff ("Immunity Through Surrender Negotiations: the Case of the SS Obergruppenfuehrer Karl Wolff, from which her book SS und Secret Service (2010) was created. This was published in English as Allen Dulles, the OSS, and Nazi War Criminals (2013). From 1999 to 2008 she was a research associate at the Sonderforschungsbereich 437 Kriegserfahrungen (Research School for War and Society in Modern Times) in Tübingen. From 2006 to 2012 she worked as an expert for the Stuttgart Attorney General in preliminary proceedings on Nazi war crimes in Italy, and taught at the University of Marburg, University of Tübingen, and Heidelberg University. She was a Summer School Fellow at the United States Holocaust Memorial Museum in 2006, and a Research Fellow of European Studies at the Research Institute of the University of Salford in 2007. The following year she was accepted as a Fellow in the Royal Historical Society of London. From 2009 to 2011 she was a research associate at the German-Italian Historical Commission.

Lingen was Junior Research Group Leader at the "Asia and Europe in a Global Context" Cluster of Excellence at the University of Heidelberg from 2013 to 2017. Her group worked on "Transcultural Justice: Legal Flows and the Emergence of International Justice in the East Asian War Crimes Trials, 1945–1954." It conducted research on the Allied war crimes trials against members of the Japanese military in the Pacific and the role of the Allies in the Tokyo Tribunal, the Asian equivalent of the Nuremberg Tribunal. During this time Lingen also worked on her habilitation project, "Transnational Debates on the Humanization of War Powers, 1864–1945: an Intellectual History of the Concept of Crimes against Humanity." In 2016, she was awarded the International Chair of the History of the Second World War, an annual lecture prize by the Université libre de Bruxelles. Her habilitation took place in 2017. That year she was a visiting fellow at the Australian National University and the University of Cambridge.

From 2017 to 2018, Lingen was a visiting professor of Contemporary History (comparative dictatorship, violence, and genocide research) at the University of Vienna. In October 2018, she was appointed interim professor at the Department of History at Heidelberg University. In March 2019, Lingen was appointed Professor of Contemporary History (comparative dictatorship, violence and genocide research) at the Department for Contemporary History at the University of Vienna.

== Selected bibliography ==
=== German ===
- von Lingen, Kerstin (2004). Kesselrings letzte Schlacht: Kriegsverbrecherprozesse, Vergangenheitspolitik und Wiederbewaffnung; der Fall Kesselring. Krieg in der Geschichte 20 (in German). Paderborn; München; Wien; Zürich: Schöningh. ISBN 3-506-71749-9. OCLC 964501750.
- von Lingen, Kerstin (February 2007). "Partisanenkrieg und Wehrmachtsjustiz am Beispiel: Italien 1943-1945". Zeitschrift für Genozidforschung (in German). 8 (2): 8–41. doi:10.5771/1438-8332-2007-2-8. ISSN 1438-8332.
- von Lingen, Kerstin, ed. (2009). Kriegserfahrung und nationale Identität in Europa nach 1945: Erinnerung, Säuberungsprozesse und nationales Gedächtnis. Krieg in der Geschichte 49 (in German). Paderborn; München; Wien; Zürich: Schöningh. ISBN 978-3-506-76743-1. OCLC 876579179.
- von Lingen, Kerstin (2010). SS und Secret Service: "Verschwörung des Schweigens": die Akte Karl Wolff (in German). Paderborn; München; Wien; Zürich: Schöningh. ISBN 978-3-506-76744-8. OCLC 535492245.
- von Lingen, Kerstin; Gestwa, Klaus, eds. (2014). Zwangsarbeit als Kriegsressource in Europa und Asien. Krieg in der Geschichte 77 (in German). Paderborn; München; Wien; Zürich: Schöningh. ISBN 978-3-506-77727-0. OCLC 871305713.

=== English ===
- von Lingen, Kerstin; Salter, Michael (2005). "Contrasting Strategies within the War Crimes Trials of Kesselring and Wolff". Liverpool Law Review. 26 (3): 225–266. doi:10.1007/s10991-005-1599-y. ISSN 0144-932X. S2CID 144367431.
- von Lingen, Kerstin (Spring 2008). "Conspiracy of Silence: How the "Old Boys" of American Intelligence Shielded SS General Karl Wolff from Prosecution". Holocaust and Genocide Studies. 22 (1): 74–109. doi:10.1093/hgs/dcn004. ISSN 1476-7937 – via Project MUSE.
- von Lingen, Kerstin (2009). Kesselring's Last Battle: War Crimes Trials and Cold War Politics, 1945–1960. Lawrence, Kansas: University Press of Kansas. ISBN 978-0-7006-1641-1. OCLC 263605489.
- von Lingen, Kerstin (2015). "Hitler's Military Elite in Italy and the Question of "Decent War"". In Messenger, David A.; Paehler, Katrin (eds.). A Nazi Past: Recasting German Identity in Postwar Europe. Lexington, Kentucky: University Press of Kentucky. ISBN 978-0-8131-6056-6. JSTOR j.ctt13x1rt2.11. OCLC 910966211.
- von Lingen, Kerstin (2013). Allen Dulles, the OSS, and Nazi War Criminals: the Dynamics of Selective Prosecution. New York, New York: Oxford University Press. ISBN 978-1-107-02593-6. OCLC 835971399.
- von Lingen, Kerstin, ed. (2016). Justice in Times of Turmoil: War Crimes Trials in Asia, 1945-1954. London: Palgrave Macmillan. ISBN 978-3-319-42986-1. OCLC 1023236635.
- von Lingen, Kerstin, ed. (2017). Debating Collaboration and Complicity in War Crimes Trials in Asia, 1945-1956. London: Palgrave Macmillan. ISBN 978-3-319-53141-0. OCLC 1010494726.
- von Lingen, Kerstin, ed. (2018). Transcultural Justice at the Tokyo Tribunal. The Allied Struggle for Justice, 1946-48. Leiden: Brill. ISBN 978-90-04-35997-0. OCLC 1030744766.
