= Bernd Wegner =

German historian

- Born: October 1, 1949 (age 77); Oberhausen, West Germany
- Occupations: Historian; author; editor

Academic background
- Education: University of Hamburg

Academic work
- Era: 20th century
- Institutions: Military History Research Office (MGFA); Helmut Schmidt University
- Main interests: Modern European history, history of international relations, military history, historiography
- Notable works: Germany and the Second World War

Bernd Wegner (born October 1, 1949) is a German historian who specialises in military history and the history of Nazism. Since 1997 he has been professor of modern history at the Helmut Schmidt University in Hamburg, Germany.

Wegner is a contributor to the seminal work Germany and the Second World War from the Military History Research Office (MGFA). His book on the Waffen-SS, published in English as The Waffen-SS: Organization, Ideology and Function by Blackwell Publishing, has been issued in Germany in nine editions (the latest being 2010) and is considered to be the standard work on the history of the Waffen-SS; concentrating on the pre-war years.

== Education and career ==
After military service in the Bundeswehr, Wegner studied history, philosophy and political science at the Universities of Tübingen, Vienna and Hamburg. He earned his PhD in 1980 at the University of Hamburg, completing his dissertation under Klaus-Jürgen Müller (historian) at the History Department. Wegner worked for over 15 years at the Military History Research Office (MGFA) in Freiburg, Germany. Since 1997, Wegner is a professor of Modern History of Western Europe at the Helmut Schmidt University of the Bundeswehr (Federal Armed Forces) in Hamburg. His students included future military historians Agilolf Kesselring, Thorsten Loch, Rudolf J. Schlaffer, Oliver von Wrochem and John Zimmermann (historian).

== Historian of Nazi Germany ==
Wegner is a widely published author and editor on the subjects of military history of Nazi Germany and the history of National Socialism. From 2000 to 2005, Wegner was chairman of the German Committee for the History of the Second World War. He is co-editor of the book series War in History published by Verlag Ferdinand Schöningh in Germany. He is also one of the authors of the seminal work Germany and the Second World War from the Military History Research Office (MGFA) contributing to several volumes of the series.

Several of Wegner's books have been published in English, including The Waffen-SS: Organization, Ideology and Function. According to historian Timothy Garton Ash, Wegner is "the leading authority on the Waffen-SS". Although, as Wegner writes in the book introduction, his focus on the Waffen-SS "concentrates more on the pre-war" years and for the war-time history of the organisation he recommends "especially", George Stein's work The Waffen-SS: Hitler's Elite Guard at War 1939–1945.

Wegner was the editor of the 1998 collection of essays that appeared in English as From Peace to War: Germany, Soviet Russia, and the World, 1939–1941 published by Berghahn Books. The review at H-Net finds that:

On the whole, the thirty-five essays succeed extremely well in meeting the editors' objectives. Not only does the reader get the promised overview of research and scholarly debates, thanks to the international cast of contributors (nine different countries are represented here)--the book also touches on a lot of international scholarship that because of its vast scope and linguistic diversity would be impossible to master for any single individual.

== Works ==
=== In English ===
- Wegner, Bernd (1990). The Waffen-SS: Organization, Ideology and Function. New York: Blackwell Publishers. ISBN 978-0-631-14073-3.
- Germany and the Second World War, Vol. VI: The Global War, with Horst Boog, Werner Rahn, Reinhard Stumpf (historian)
- Wegner, Bernd, ed. (1997). From Peace to War: Germany, Soviet Russia, and the World, 1939–1941. Berghahn Books. ISBN 1-57181-882-0.

=== In German ===
- Hitlers politische Soldaten. Die Waffen-SS 1933–1945: Leitbild, Struktur und Funktion einer nationalsozialistischen Elite. 9. Auflage. Schöningh, Paderborn 2010, ISBN 978-3-506-76313-6 (überarbeitete Dissertation, Universität Hamburg, 1980).
- Das Deutsche Reich und der Zweite Weltkrieg. Hrsg. v. Militärgeschichtlichen Forschungsamt. Bd. 6: Die Ausweitung zum Weltkrieg und der Wechsel der Initiative 1941–1943. Deutsche Verlagsanstalt, Stuttgart 1990, ISBN 3-421-06233-1. (Co-author)
- Das Deutsche Reich und der Zweite Weltkrieg. Bd.8: Die Ostfront 1943/44. Der Krieg im Osten und an den Nebenfronten. Deutsche Verlagsanstalt, Stuttgart 2007, ISBN 978-3-421-06235-2. (Co-author)
- Die Waffen-SS. Neue Forschungen, as part of the War in History (series), Verlag Ferdinand Schöningh, 2014, with Peter Lieb and Jan Erik Schulte
