= Johannes Hürter =

German historian (born 1963)

Johannes Hürter (born 17 December 1963) is a German historian. He is the director of the Munich research division of the Institute of Contemporary History. His research interests focus mainly on the history of Nazi Germany and on post-war anti-terrorism policy.

== Career ==
Hürter was born in Hamburg. He studied history, German and musicology at the Heidelberg University and the University of Mainz. In 1992 he received his doctorate from the University of Mainz, his thesis was on Wilhelm Groener, the Reich Minister of Defence of the Weimar Republic.

In 2005, Hürter completed his habilitation with his book Hitler's Heerfuhrer, which was created as part of the Institute of Contemporary History project, The Wehrmacht during the Nazi Dictatorship. The book was rated as a groundbreaking work in historical review journals such as H-Soz-u-Kult and Sehepunkte. His work also received positive reviews in the national press such as the Frankfurter Allgemeine Zeitung, Süddeutsche Zeitung and Die Zeit.

From 1992 to 1995 Hürter was a postdoctoral fellow of the German Research Foundation and a member of the historical commission at the Bavarian Academy of Sciences and Humanities. He then worked for two years as a researcher at the Federal Foreign Office in Bonn. Hürter has been a research associate at the Munich Institute for Contemporary History (IfZ) since August 1998. In the early 2010s, he became Head of Research Department Munich. He is also the editor of the institute's quarterly journals for contemporary history and their other publications. Hürter is also an adjunct professor in the Department of Modern History of the University of Mainz.
