= Sönke Neitzel =

German historian (born 1968)

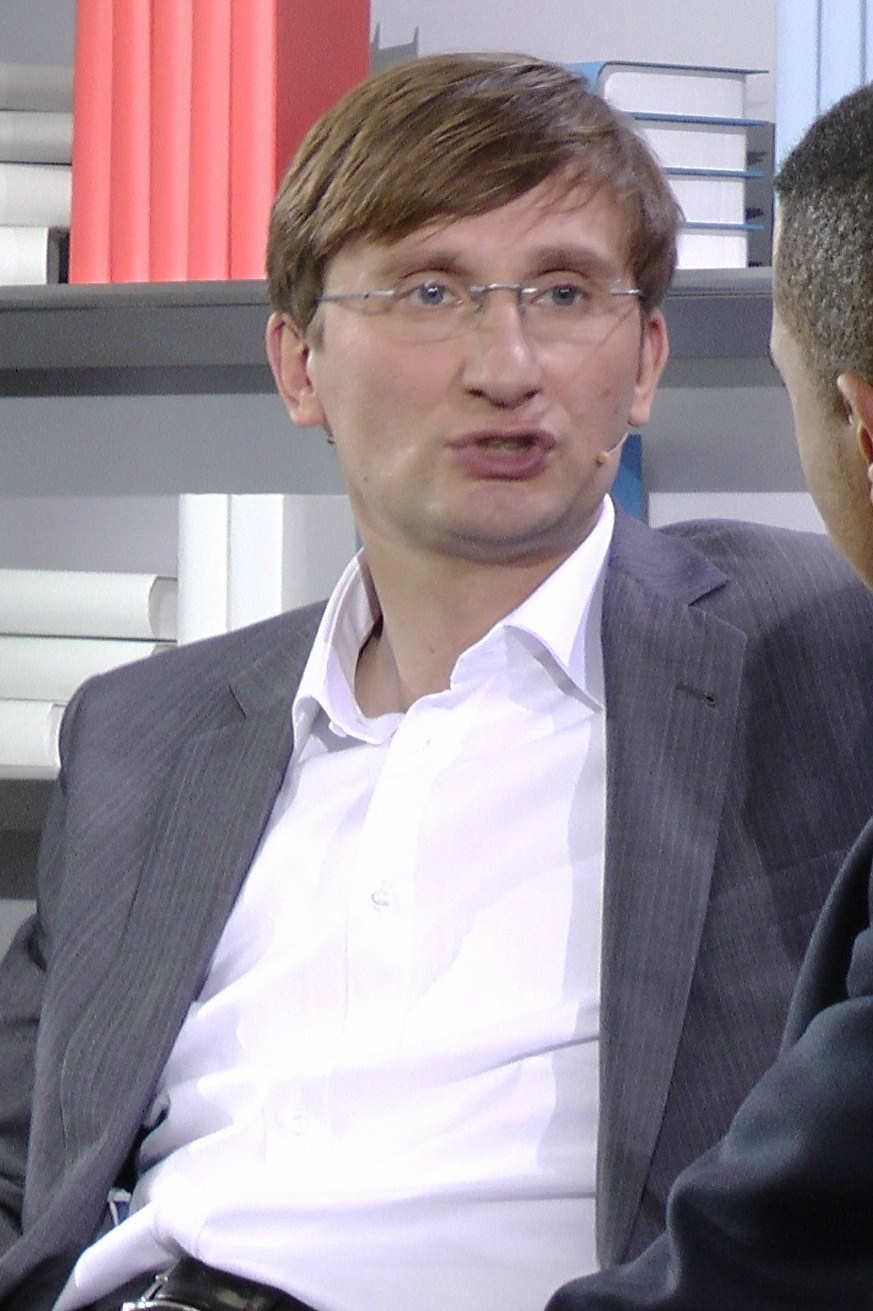
- Neitzel in 2011
- Born: June 26, 1968 (age 58); Hamburg, West Germany
- Education: University of Mainz
- Scientific career
- Fields: Military history
- Workplaces: University of Potsdam; London School of Economics

Sönke Neitzel (born 26 June 1968) is a German historian who has written extensively about the Second World War. He is editor of the journal German History in the 20th Century and has written several books such as Soldaten: On Fighting, Killing and Dying; The Secret Second World War Tapes of German POWs based on recordings of German POWs held at Trent Park which he wrote with Harald Welzer. Neitzel edited the book Tapping Hitler's Generals (with Harald Welzer).

== Early life and career ==
Neitzel was educated at the University of Mainz and is currently Professor of Military History at the University of Potsdam, having moved there from the London School of Economics in 2015. He has also held posts at the University of Karlsruhe, University of Bern, and the University of Saarbrücken in Germany and Switzerland, and was briefly Professor of Global Security at the University of Glasgow in 2011/12.

Since September 2006 he has been married to Gundula Bavendamm, director of Stiftung Flucht, Vertreibung, Versöhnung and daughter of historian Dirk Bavendamm.
