= Verlag Ferdinand Schöningh =

German publishing house

Verlag Ferdinand Schöningh is a German publishing house, founded in the 19th century by Ferdinand Schöningh (1815-1883). It is based in Paderborn and focuses on the fields of contemporary history, academic theology, philosophy, philology, and pedagogy. Since 2017 it is an imprint of Brill Publishers. Since 2024 it became together with Brill Publishers part of German publish company De Gruyter in Berlin.
