= Institute of Contemporary History (Munich) =

Research institute

Coordinates: 48°09′25″N 11°32′36″E

The Institute of Contemporary History (Institut für Zeitgeschichte) in Munich was conceived in 1947 under the name Deutsches Institut für Geschichte der nationalsozialistischen Zeit ("German Institute of the History of the National Socialist Era"). Founded by the German government and the State of Bavaria at the suggestion of the Allied Forces, it was established in 1949 and renamed in 1952. Its purpose is the analysis of contemporary German history.

== History ==
The institute is funded by the German government, and the German states of Bavaria, Baden-Württemberg, Brandenburg, Hesse, Lower Saxony, North Rhine-Westphalia and Saxony. The first director of the institute was Hans Rothfels, the second director was Martin Broszat. Representatives of the supporting states are also members of the institute's board.

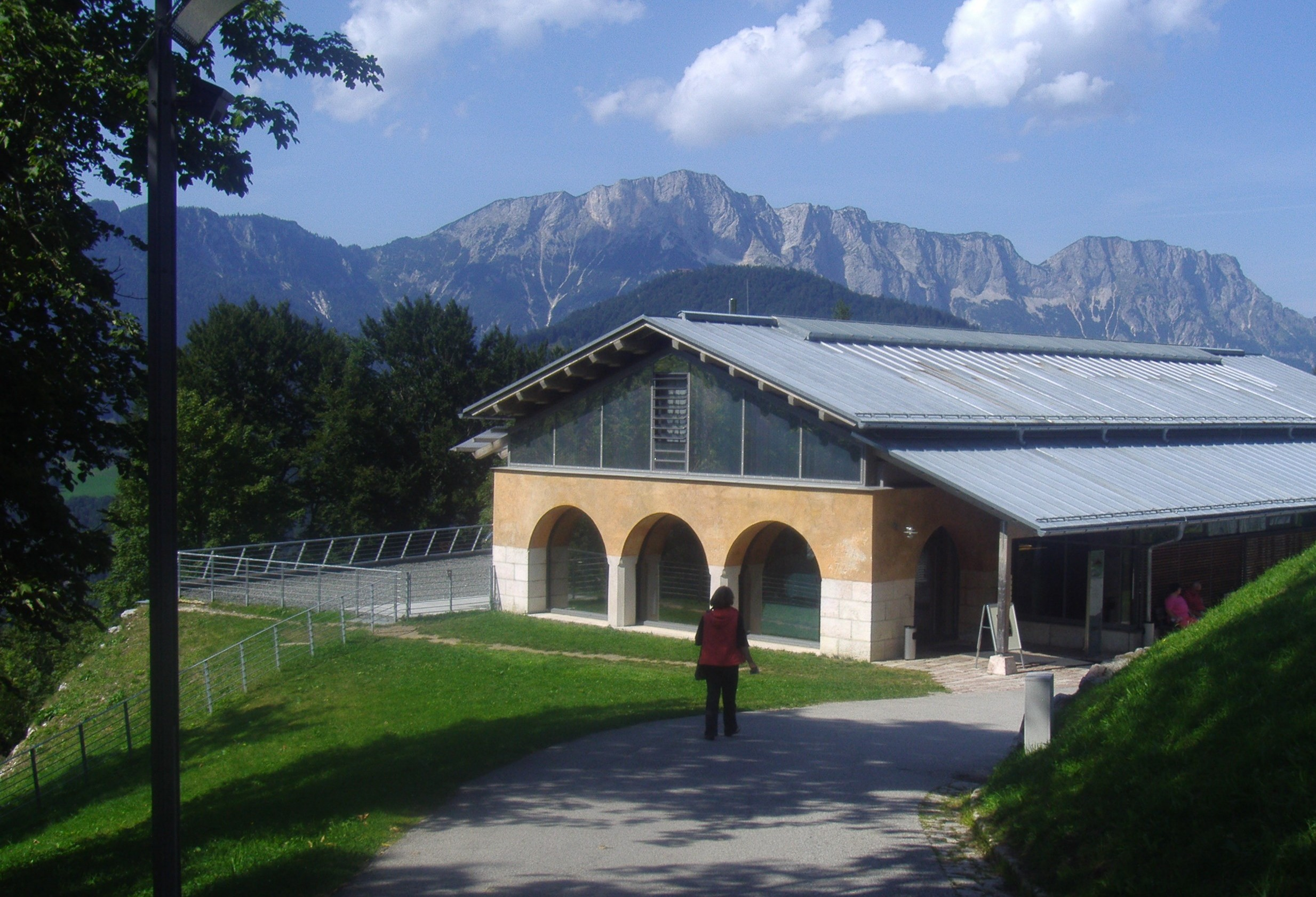
The Dokumentationszentrum Obersalzberg

Since 1953, the institute has been publishing the journal Vierteljahrshefte für Zeitgeschichte (Contemporary History Quarterly), which is regarded as one of the most important publications of German historical research. The institute has also published extensive editions of contemporary historical documents, such as The Foreign Policy Files of the Bundesrepublik Deutschland and Goebbels Diaries.

In 1994, the institute founded a branch in Potsdam, which has been based near the German Federal Archives since 1996. The focus of research at the Berlin branch of the institute is the history of the German Democratic Republic (GDR). The branch Abteilung des IfZ im Auswärtigen Amt (IfZ Department in the Foreign Office), founded in 1990 (first situated in Bonn; in Berlin, since 2000), publishes documents from the German Foreign Office.

In 1999, the institute conceived the Dokumentationszentrum Obersalzberg museum on the Obersalzberg near Berchtesgaden at the request of the Bavarian government. This exhibition documents the construction of the Obersalzberg into a showy residence for Adolf Hitler and the Nazi leadership circles. Visitors can tour the bunker complex. Access to the bunkers was closed for construction in September 2017 and remained closed in July 2018 "until further notice".

== See also ==
- Category:Institute of Contemporary History (Munich) personnel
- Centre for Contemporary History

== Bibliography ==
- Hellmuth Auerbach, "Die Gründung des Instituts für Zeitgeschichte", Vierteljahrshefte für Zeitgeschichte 18 (1970): 529–554.
- John Gimbel, "The Origins of the "Institut fuer Zeitgeschichte." Scholarship, Politics and the American Occupation of Germany, 1945–1949," American Historical Review 70 (1965), 714-731.
- Hermann Graml, Hans Woller, "Fuenfzig Jahre Vierteljahrshefte für Zeitgeschichte 1953-2003," Vierteljahrshefte fuer Zeitgeschichte 51 (2003), pp. 51–87.
- Horst Möller, Udo Wengst (Eds.): 50 Jahre Institut für Zeitgeschichte. Eine Bilanz. München 1999, ISBN 3-486-56460-9
